= South Street Area Historic District =

Historic district in New York, United States

- U.S. National Register of Historic Places
- U.S. Historic district
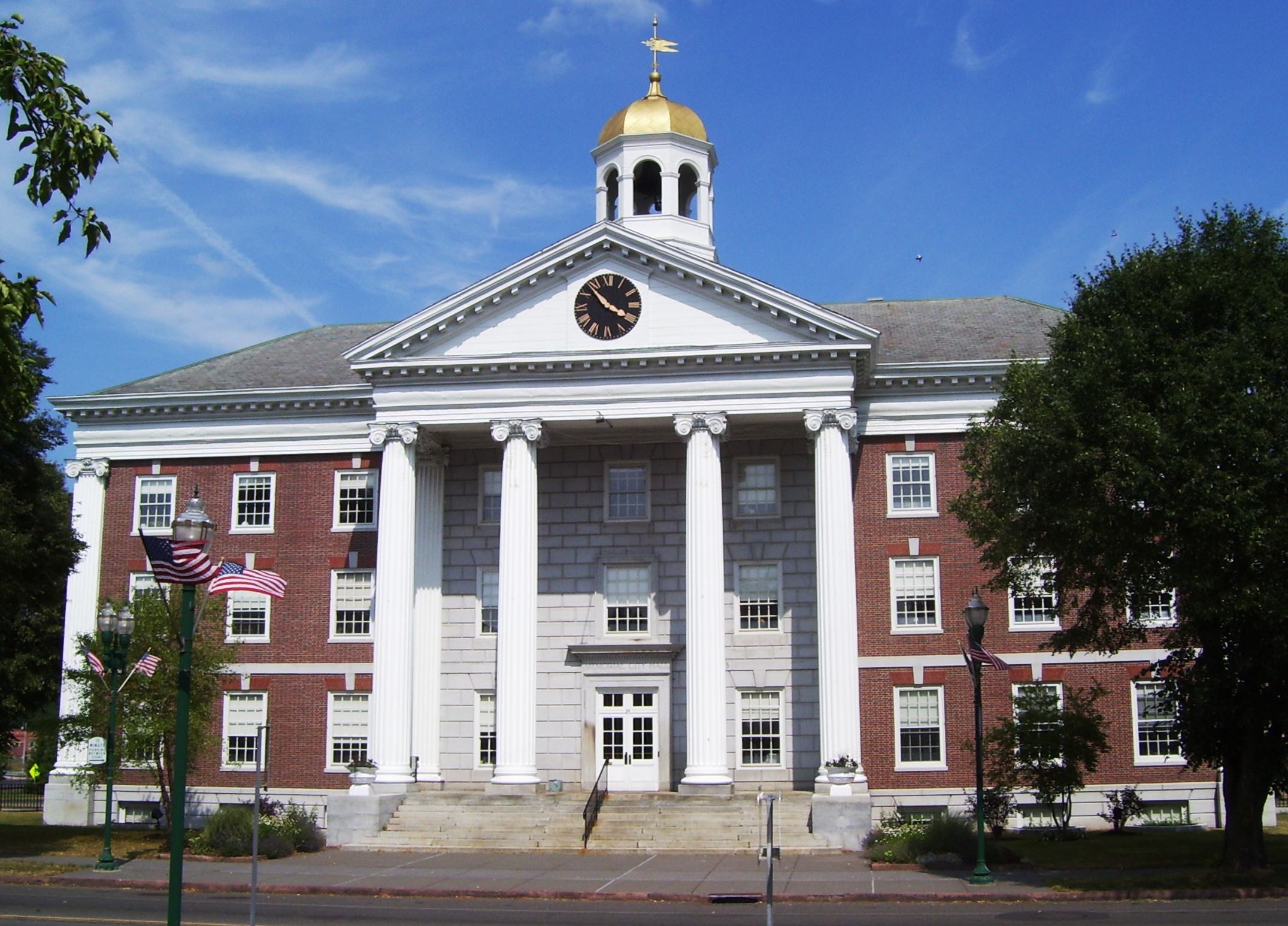
- Memorial City Hall (2012)

- Location within New York Location within the United States
- Location: Roughly, South St. and adjacent properties from Metcalf Dr. to Lincoln St., Auburn, New York
- Coordinates: 42°55′47″N 76°33′45″W
- Area: 110 acres (45 ha)
- Architect: various
- Architectural style: Late 19th And 20th Century Revivals, Early Republic, Late Victorian
- NRHP reference No.: 91000109
- Added to NRHP: March 09, 1991

South Street Area Historic District is a national historic district located in Auburn. The district contains 164 contributing resources and includes structures dating from 1800 to the 1940s. It is linear in orientation and about a mile in length along South Street from Metcalf Drive to Lincoln Street. Located within the district is the separately listed William H. Seward House.

The historic district was listed on the National Register of Historic Places in 1991.

== See also ==
- National Register of Historic Places listings in Cayuga County, New York
