= Joey Foster Ellis =

American functional artist

- Born: August 27, 1984 (age 41); Auburn, New York
- Occupation: Functional Artist

Joey Foster Ellis (born August 27, 1984) is a functional artist and craftsman and a native of Auburn, New York who received his BFA from Central Academy of Fine Arts (CAFA) in 2009, becoming its first American graduate. His work has been exhibited extensively throughout Asia and North America and can be found in numerous private collections including Secretary of State Hillary Clinton and former United States President George W. Bush. He has received several site-specific commissions, including Greenpeace, Bank of America, Chevron and Manulife and his work has been featured in such publications as The New York Times, The Wall Street Journal, Time and Newsweek. Ellis is a recipient of the 2010 TEDGlobal Fellowship and was selected by The Renwick Gallery of the Smithsonian American Art Museum as one of 40 Under 40, a major exhibition highlighting the work of forty artists born since 1972.

== Education and background ==
Joey Ellis began his art career while he was a high school student at the Putney School in Putney, Vermont. Upon graduating in 2004, Ellis attended Alfred University to begin working on a Bachelor of Fine Arts. During his studies at Alfred University, his professor told him, "Joey, you're going to China.", and Ellis found himself in Beijing two weeks later. He became the first American to graduate from the Central Academy of Fine Arts in 2009.

He is currently working towards a Master of Science in Conservation Studies with the University College London in Doha, Qatar where he currently resides.

TEDGlobal Fellowship

In 2010, Joey Ellis was the recipient of the 2010 TEDGlobal Fellowship program. This program helps world-changing innovators become part of the TEDGlobal community to portray their personal activities and projects. Fellows are chosen from a variety of disciplines.

== Notable work ==
=== Social and environmental ===
Ellis was commissioned by Greenpeace twice. His first project, "Hourglass", was presented to U.S. Secretary of State Hillary Rodham Clinton during her visit to Beijing as a symbolic message pertaining to the limitations of time regarding the global climate crisis. "Hourglass" is a 2-foot glass sculpture that took Ellis about four days to create. His second commissioned project, "100 Ice Children", was an ice installation publicly displayed in Ditan Park, Beijing. The installation consisted of 100 life-sized ice sculptures of children left to melt in the hot Beijing sun to symbolize the effects of global climate change. The ice used was taken from three rivers, the Yangtze, the Yellow and the Ganges, all of which are subject to pollution.

=== Kungfu4coral ===
Ellis is head of a multimedia coral and ocean awareness campaign in China that has been ongoing since 2010. The focus behind Kungfu4coral is to fight the "global climate monster" and serve as the voice for coral in efforts to help protect and preserve coral globally. The campaign focuses on how the Asian population can help create hope and influence coral preservation efforts in a positive way using three methods. The first suggests donating education, technology and design services to non-profits in Asia that are ocean related to help those non-profits grow, develop and partner with other like minded non-profits. The second method helps invent new outlets for environmental arts education in Asia through translation services, the creation of comics and games incorporating kungfu artists to attack the global warming monster, construction of man-made coral reefs and provide a platform for Asian-based environmental artists. The final method puts China first in this global issue by not focusing on the fear that China will destroy the environment, but the hope that they can become an influential leader in environment protection.

== Exhibitions ==
- "40 Under 40: Craft Futures", The Smithsonian American Art Museum, Washington D.C. 2012
- "Biorock", Karang Lestari Biorock Center, Pemuteran Indonesia, 2012
- "Biorock", Gili Islands Eco Trust, Lombak Indonesia, 2010
- "Golden Chainsaw", Global Papermill Conference, Shanghai 2010
- "Great Climate Wall", United Nations Climate Change Summit, Tianjin 2010
- "Hope and Pain: Exhibition of Water Pollution along the Yangtze", Beijing 2010
- "Zhou Yi Ba Gua", Lane Crawford, Beijing 2010
- "China Tree", The Opposite House, Beijing 2009-2010
- "100 Ice Children", One Moon Gallery, Ditan Park, Beijing 2010
- "Xiao Zhou", Central Academy of Fine Arts BFA Thesis Exhibition 2009
- "Wheaties Commercial", Art Direction of Olympic Box Unveiling Beijing 2008
- "Print and Community", Travelling Beijing Exhibition 2008
- "Foshan International Ceramic Exhibition", Foshan China 2007
- "Harbin International Ice and Snow Festival" Harbin China 2006
- "Made in New York" Schweinfurth Art Museum, Auburn New York 2004

== Collections ==
- Foshan Museum of Ceramic Work, Guangzhou China
- United States Embassy, Beijing China
- Central Academy of Fine Arts, Beijing China
- Renwick Gallery, Smithsonian American Art Museum, Washington D.C.
- 41st United States President George W. Bush
- Secretary of State Hillary Rodham Clinton
- United Nations Climate Change Center, Bonn Germany
- Chevron
- Manulife
- Greenpeace
- K&L Gates, Hong Kong

== Awards ==
- 2012 selected artist for the Renwick Gallery's "40 Under 40: Craft Features" Exhibition
- 2010 TEDGlobal Fellow
