= Case Memorial-Seymour Library =

- U.S. National Register of Historic Places
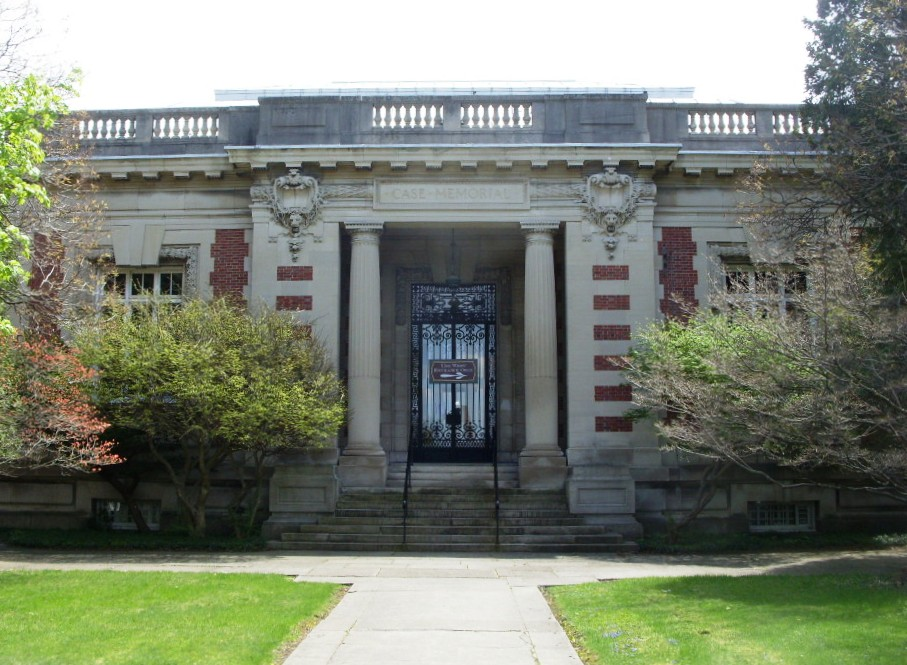
- (2009)

- Location within New York Location within the United States
- Location: 176 Genesee St. Auburn, New York
- Coordinates: 42°55′44″N 76°34′18″W
- Area: 0.7 acres (0.28 ha)
- Built: 1898
- Architect: Carrere & Hastings
- Architectural style: Beaux-Arts
- NRHP reference No.: 80002594
- Added to NRHP: May 6, 1980

The Case Memorial-Seymour Library is a historic library building located at 176 Genesee Street in Auburn. It was built in 1898 and as designed by architects Carrère and Hastings, in the Beaux-Arts style. It is a square, two story, three bay building constructed of Flemish bond brick and limestone topped by a hipped roof. It opened in 1903 and was expanded in 1972.

The building was listed on the National Register of Historic Places in 1980.

== See also ==
- National Register of Historic Places listings in Cayuga County, New York
