= Belt-Gaskin House =

Historic house in New York, United States

- U.S. National Register of Historic Places
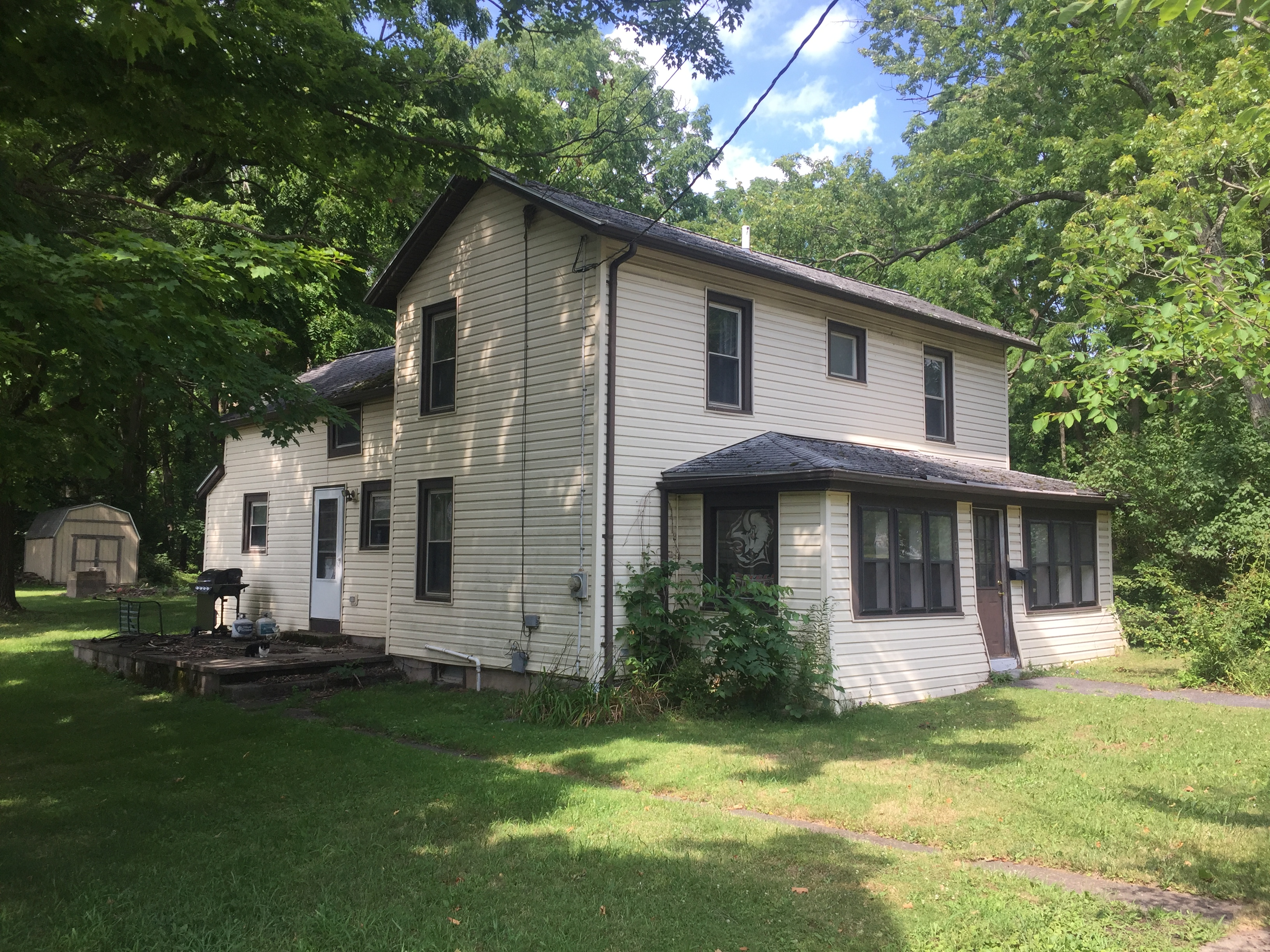
- House in 2022

- Location within New York Location within the United States
- Location: 77 Chapman Avenue, Auburn, New York
- Coordinates: 42.92016°N 76.57575°W
- Area: 0.8 acres (0.32 ha)
- Built: 1868
- Architectural style: Mid-late 19th Century
- MPS: Freedom Trail, Abolitionism, and African American Life in Central New York MPS
- NRHP reference No.: 05001135
- Added to NRHP: October 5, 2005

Belt-Gaskin House is a historic home located at Auburn in Cayuga County, New York. It is a two-story, three-bay frame house built about 1868. The house was built by African Americans Thomas and Rachel Belt (or possibly Bell), who returned to the U.S. from Canada after the conclusion of the Civil War.

The National Register nomination document asserts:

Evidence that the Belt family were freedom seekers is circumstantial but compelling. About 1805, Rachael Belt and Thomas Belt were born in Maryland, almost certainly in slavery. In the 1840s, they came to New York State, where their son George was born about 1849. Perhaps as a result of the Fugitive Slave Law of 1850, they left New York State for Canada, where another son, Isaiah, was born about 1854. Between 1865 and 1870, Thomas and Rachael Belt returned to the United States. On November 5, 1868, they bought a house on Cornell Street (now Chapman Avenue) in Auburn, New York, in a neighborhood near Harriet Tubman's home, where many other freedom seekers, as well as many Irish and U.S.-born people of European-American descent, were also buying homes. The Belt house appeared on an 1868 manuscript map by John S. Clark, from a survey by A.C. Taber, along with a series of small houses built on the north side of Cornell Street.

The property was purchased by Thomas Belt (or Bell) from Horace and Mary Fitch; Horace Fitch was son of abolitionist, industrialist Abijah Fitch. Based on property tax assessments, it appears the house was probably built in two parts, one by 1868 and the other at some point between 1869 and 1874.

The pastor of the Thomson AME Zion Church, Reverend John Thomas, who had been born a slave in Virginia in 1814, was a boarder at the house when he died in 1894.

The house was purchased in 1927 by Philip and Mary Gaskin.

It was listed on the National Register of Historic Places in 2005.
