= Schines Auburn Theatre =

- U.S. National Register of Historic Places
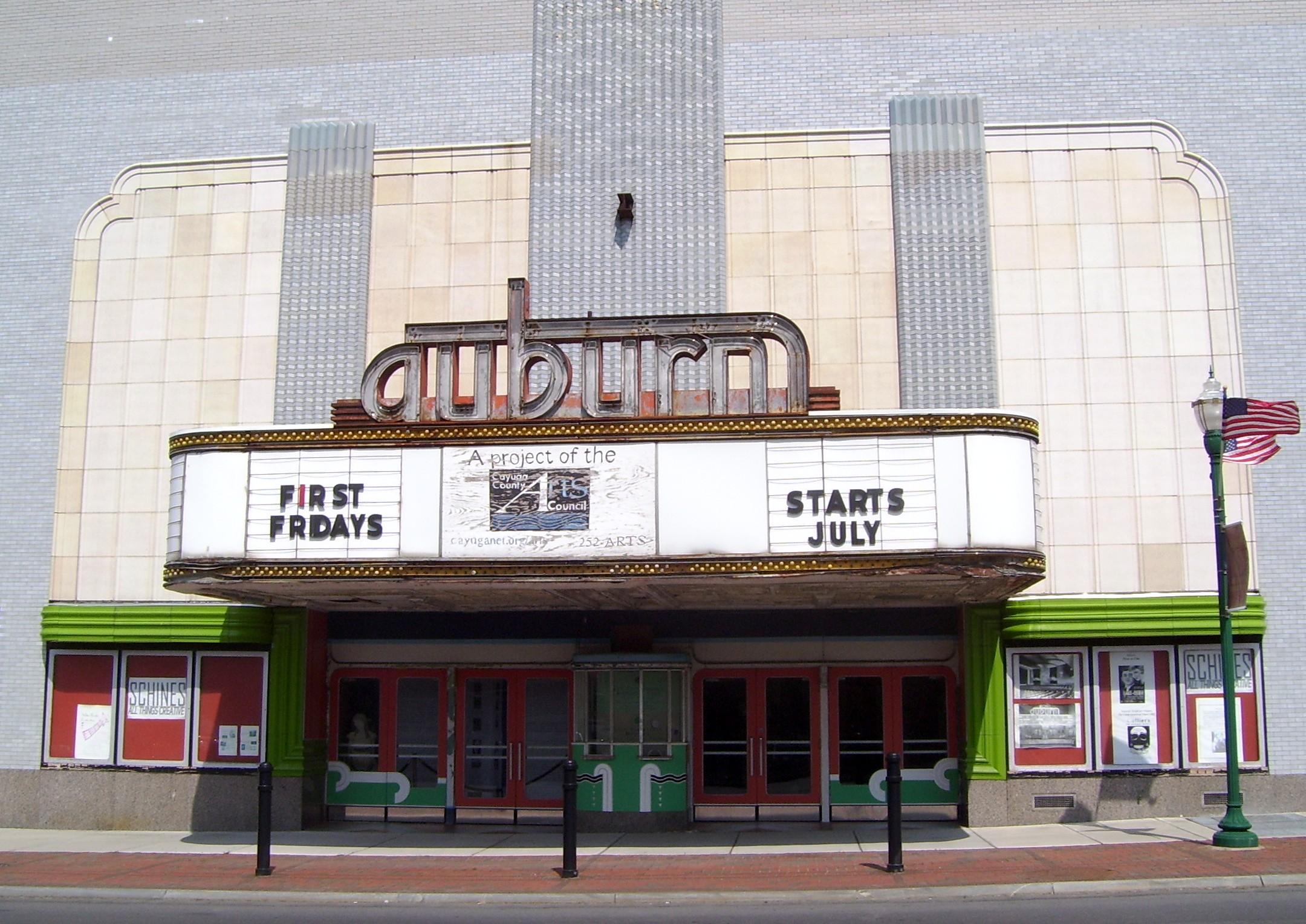
- (2012)

- Location within New York Location within the United States
- Location: 12-14 South St. Auburn, New York
- Coordinates: 42°55′52″N 76°33′56″W
- Built: 1938
- Architect: John Eberson
- Architectural style: Streamline Moderne
- NRHP reference No.: 94001333
- Added to NRHP: March 15, 2000

Schine's Auburn Theatre is a historic theatre building located at 12-14 South Street between Genesee and Lincoln Streets in Auburn, New York. It is currently owned by the City of Auburn N.Y. It is an outstanding example of the later Art Deco style of architecture in the Streamline Moderne vein designed by the noted theatre architect John Eberson. It was completed in 1938 and features a ceramic brick and terra cotta facade, a stylized marquee, and a 2,000 seat auditorium with a complex arrangement of flat and curvilinear wall and ceiling surfaces and reveals and decorated with a shooting star motif.

The Schine's Theatre operation had two other theatres in Auburn, the Jefferson and the Palace, but the Auburn Theatre was the only one built specifically for the chain. The theatre was air conditioned using the latest available equipment, and it offered hard-of-hearing customers special headphones to better hear the films.

The theatre has been undergoing renovation since 2003, and the project was not complete as of 2024. It was listed on the National Register of Historic Places in 2000.

== See also ==
- National Register of Historic Places listings in Cayuga County, New York
