= Auburn Bearing & Manufacturing =

- Auburn Bearing & Manufacturing Logo
- Company type: Privately Held
- Industry: Industrial Equipment Manufacturing
- Founded: Auburn, New York; 1898
- Headquarters: Macedon, New York
- Area served: International
- Key people: Peter J. Schroth Owner & General Manager
- Products: Thrust Bearings; Banded Thrust Bearings; Ball & Roller Bearings; Radial Bearings; Custom Bearings; Auburn V-Groove Bearings; Industry Standard Bearings; Custom Machined Components
- Services: CNC Turning; CNC Milling; CNC Grinding; Reverse Engineering; Prototyping
- Website: www.auburnbearing.com

Auburn Bearing & Manufacturing is a designer and manufacturer of ball and roller thrust bearings and custom machined components and is owned and operated in the small town of Macedon in Upstate New York. Founded in 1898, Auburn Bearing is one of the oldest continuously operating thrust ball bearing manufacturers in the United States. Auburn Bearing & Manufacturing is most known for its line of thrust bearings that incorporate a "V" groove raceway, historically known as the "Auburn Groove," which is specifically designed to reduce rolling friction by containing the ball bearings with four points of contact.

== History ==
In 1860, Mark Dean Knowlton founded a Chicago-based paper box manufacturing business. The business, operating under the name M.D. Knowlton & Company, lasted until the Great Chicago Fire in 1871. Knowlton rebuilt the business and resumed his paper box manufacturing operation within the same year. In March 1892, he sold his interest in the paper box manufacturing portion of his business in order to concentrate on inventing production machinery for the paper box manufacturing industry. In 1888, Knowlton moved his machinery business to Rochester, New York, where he then formed a partnership with Fred H. Beach, and the two business men began operating under the new business name Knowlton & Beach.

In 1893, Knowlton & Beach introduced a near frictionless ball bearing to the market, presumably the first such bearing of its time, and in 1900, the company's bearing business was incorporated as the Rochester Ball Bearing Company and became a division of Knowlton & Beach. A year later in 1901, Knowlton & Beach further expanded their bearing business with the acquisition of the Auburn Ball Bearing Company, a manufacturer of ball and roller thrust bearings established in 1898 in Auburn, New York. Auburn Ball Bearing became the second division of Knowlton & Beach and was relocated to Rochester, New York to continue its operations. Auburn Ball Bearing's primary product, their Auburn Four-Point-Cone-Contact Ball Thrust Bearings, incorporates an exclusive "V" groove raceway, designed to distribute the load evenly over the balls as they travel on four points of contact, creating a straight line rolling effect and decreasing the amount of friction created by a full contact round groove design. Auburn Ball Bearing Company manufactured various sizes and configurations of their "V" groove thrust bearings for applications in industries including paper box manufacturing, railroad jacks, U.S. submarines, and U.S. Government Light Houses. Early company documentation illustrates Auburn Ball Bearings were used to support revolving lenses in the Carysfort Reef Light, Jupiter Inlet Light, and the St. Simons Island Light in the early twentieth century.

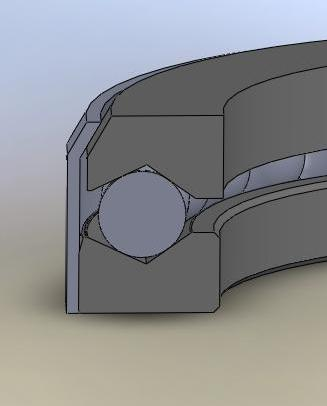
Ball bearing in a v-groove raceway showing four points of contact.

In 1904, Fred Beach retired and withdrew his interest in the Knowlton & Beach co-partnership. Knowlton subsequently took over the entire interest of the company, and later that year, he incorporated the company in New York under the name M.D. Knowlton Company. Knowlton served as president of the M.D. Knowlton Co. and the Auburn Ball Bearing Co. until his death in 1906. Knowlton was succeeded by his son, Colonel Frederick K. Knowlton, who served as president of the company until his death in 1939. During his time as president, the Auburn Ball Bearing Division of M.D. Knowlton Company was able to patent a number of new and useful improvements in the design of bearings, particularly in the design of ball thrust bearings, under inventor Francis A. Collins, Jr.

- Ball Bearing Patent US1219919A — Triple-race ball bearing which is self-contained, readily positioned, and high efficient in its operations (patented March 20, 1917).
- Ball Bearing Patent US1219920A — Double thrust ball bearing which is self-contained, and, therefore, capable of being handled and positioned as a unit (patented March 20, 1917).
- Ball Bearing Patent US1219921A — Double thrust ball bearing which is capable, when installed, of slight radial movements to accommodate itself to the radial position of the shaft, due to wear of the bearings, but is also capable of accommodating itself to angular changes in the position of the shaft, while providing a means for holding the parts of the bearing together to form a unit of the same so that it may be readily handled and positioned (patented March 20, 1917).

The business continued through the war years and post-war period under family direction. In 1969 and 1970, M.D. Knowlton Company moved operations to Victor, New York, where the Knowlton Building then served as the company's headquarters.

On August 18, 2006, Fairport Products, a designer and manufacturer of power transmission parts, acquired the Auburn Ball Bearing Division of M.D. Knowlton Company, and its operations were then moved to the small town of Macedon, New York. The businesses continued to operate as two separate business entities until June 10, 2013, when the two companies became one under the new name Auburn Bearing & Manufacturing. Auburn Bearing & Manufacturing continues to manufacture the original Auburn Groove Thrust Bearing which features a V-groove raceway with four contact points to reduce rolling friction, enabling larger radial loads. The company also manufactures round groove industry standard bearings, particularly custom, obsolete bearings in low- to mid- production volume. Their products are distributed by industrial distributors such as Motion Industries, Kaman Industrial Technologies, Applied Industrial Technologies and BDI.
