= Auburn, New York =

City in New York, United States

- City
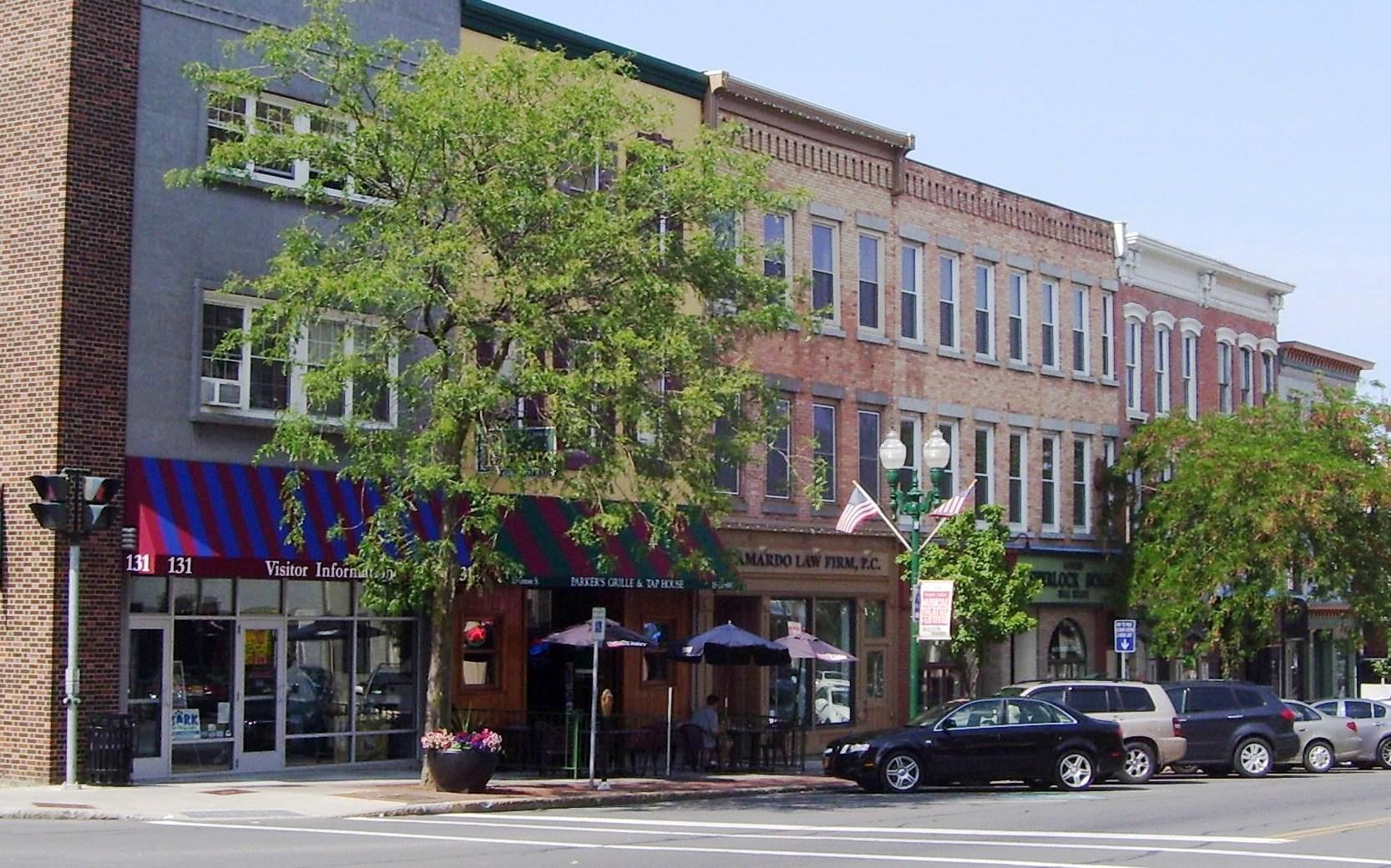
- North side of Genesee Street in downtown Auburn

- Seal
- Nickname: Prison City
- Location in Cayuga County and the state of New York

- Location within New York Location within the United States
- Coordinates: 42°56′N 76°34′W
- Country: United States
- State: New York
- County: Cayuga
- Incorporated: 1815 (village); 1848 (city)

Government
  - Type: Council-Manager
  - Mayor: James Giannettino, Jr. (D)
  - City Manager: Jeff Dygert
  - City Council: Members' List: • Terry Cuddy (D); • Ginny Kent (D); • Christina Calarco (D); • Dr. Rhoda Overstreet-Wilson (D)

Area
  - Total: 8.41 sq mi (21.78 km^{2})
  - Land: 8.34 sq mi (21.59 km^{2})
  - Water: 0.077 sq mi (0.20 km^{2})
- Elevation: 686 ft (209 m)

Population (2020)
  - Total: 26,866
  - Density: 3,223.1/sq mi (1,244.46/km^{2})
- Time zone: UTC-5 (Eastern (EST))
  - Summer (DST): UTC-4 (EDT)
- ZIP Codes: 13021, 13024
- Area code: 315
- FIPS code: 36-011-03078
- GNIS feature ID: 0942692
- Website: auburnny.gov

Auburn is a city in Cayuga County, New York, United States. Located at the north end of Owasco Lake, one of the Finger Lakes in Central New York, the city had a population of 26,866 at the 2020 census. It is the largest city of Cayuga County, the county seat, and the site of the maximum-security Auburn Correctional Facility, as well as the William H. Seward House Museum and the house of abolitionist Harriet Tubman.

== History ==
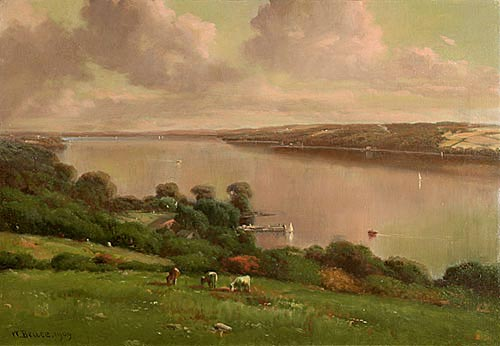
Auburn, New York (1909), by William Bruce (1861–1911)

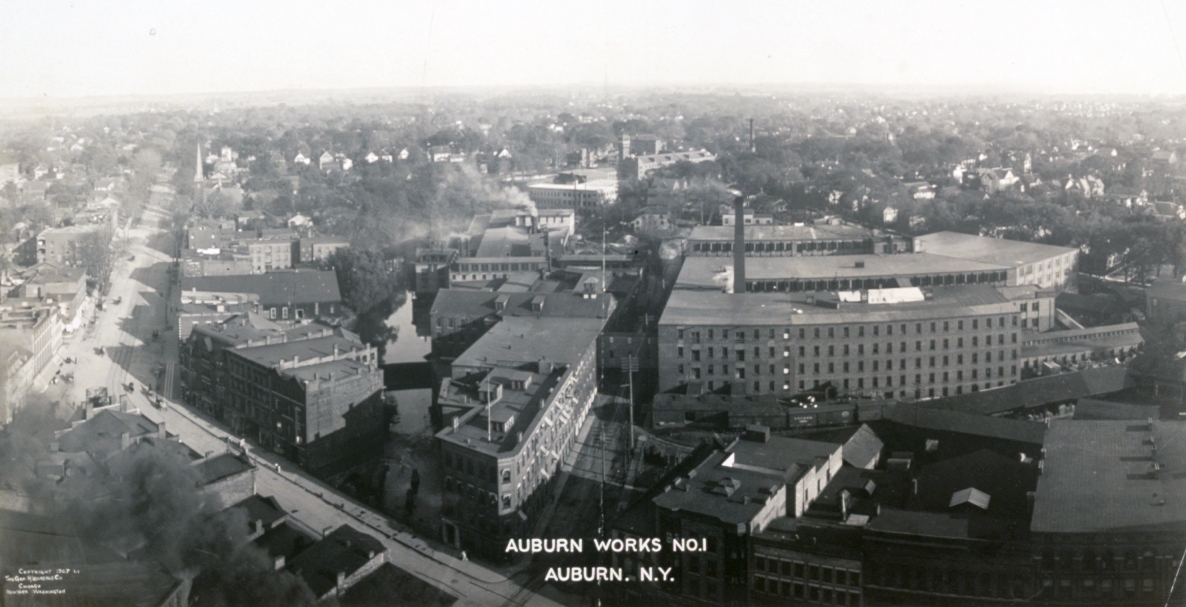
The Auburn Works in 1907

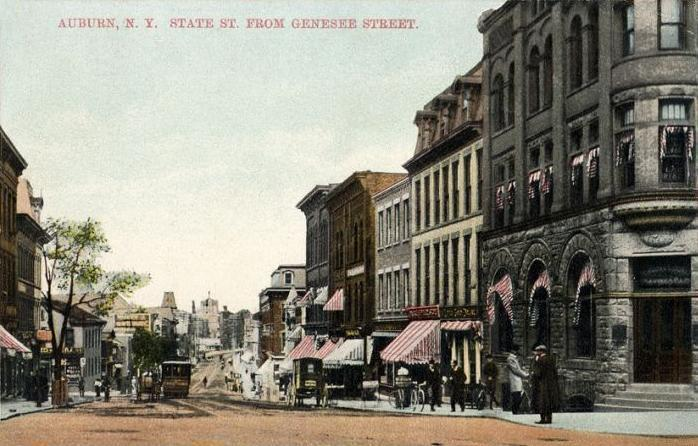
State Street in 1910

Auburn was founded in 1793, during the post-Revolutionary period of settlement of western New York. The founder, John L. Hardenbergh, was a veteran of the Sullivan-Clinton campaign against the Iroquois during the American Revolution. Hardenbergh settled in the vicinity of the Owasco River with his infant daughter and two African-American indentured servants, Harry and Kate Freeman. After his death in 1806, Hardenbergh was buried in Auburn's North Street Cemetery, and was re-interred in 1852 in Fort Hill Cemetery – the first burial in the city's newly opened burial ground. The community grew up around Hardenbergh's gristmill and sawmill.

Originally known as Hardenbergh's Corners in the town of Aurelius, the settlement was renamed Auburn in 1805 when it became the county seat. It became an incorporated village in 1815, and was chartered as a city in 1848. It was only a few miles from the Erie Canal, which opened in 1825 and allowed local factories to inexpensively ship goods north or south. In 1871, the Southern Central Railroad, financed by the Lehigh Valley Railroad, completed a line primarily to carry anthracite coal from Athens, Pennsylvania, through Auburn to wharves on Lake Ontario at Fair Haven.

From 1818 to 1939, Auburn was home to Auburn Theological Seminary, one of the preeminent theological seminaries in the United States. In 1939, facing financial difficulties as a result of the Great Depression, the seminary moved to the campus of Union Theological Seminary in New York City. The only building from the Auburn Theological Seminary that stands today is Willard Memorial Chapel and the adjacent Welch Memorial Hall on Nelson Street, designed by Andrew Jackson Warner of Rochester, with stained-glass windows and interior decoration by Louis Comfort Tiffany. It is the only complete and unaltered Tiffany chapel interior known to exist.

In 1816, Auburn Prison (now the Auburn Correctional Facility) was founded as a model for the contemporary ideas about treating prisoners, known now as the Auburn system. Visitors were charged a fee for viewing the facility and its inmates. On August 6, 1890, the first execution by the electric chair was carried out at Auburn Prison. In 1901 Leon Czolgosz, assassin of President William McKinley, was executed there. Although the ideas of the Auburn System have been abandoned, the prison continues to serve as a maximum security facility, and is one of the most secure prisons in the continental United States.

== Geography ==
Auburn is located at 42.9317° N, 76.5661° W at the north end of Owasco Lake, one of the Finger Lakes, which is drained by the Owasco Outlet – also known as the Owasco River – which runs north through the city on its way to the Seneca River. A dam, owned and operated by the city, controls the outflow of the lake, which is used for drinking water and recreation. The city is required to keep a sufficient amount of water in the river to deal with the effluent from its waste disposal treatment facility.

According to the United States Census Bureau, the city has a total area of 8.4 square miles (21.8 km^{2}), of which 8.3 square miles (21.6 km^{2}) is land and 0.08 square miles (0.2 km^{2}), or 0.89%, is water.

US 20 is an important east-west highway passing through the city, and New York State Route 34 and New York State Route 38 are north-south highways that intersect US-20 in Auburn. Seneca Falls is 15 miles (24 km) west on US 20, and Syracuse is 26 miles (42 km) to the northeast via New York State Route 5.

== Climate ==
This climatic region is typified by large seasonal temperature differences, with warm to hot (and often humid) summers and cold (sometimes severely cold) winters. According to the Köppen Climate Classification system, Auburn has a humid continental climate, abbreviated "Dfb" on climate maps.

Climate data for Auburn, New York (1991–2020 normals, extremes 1897–present)
Month	Jan	Feb	Mar	Apr	May	Jun	Jul	Aug	Sep	Oct	Nov	Dec	Year
Record high °F (°C)	70 (21)	74 (23)	85 (29)	92 (33)	95 (35)	101 (38)	100 (38)	98 (37)	99 (37)	94 (34)	78 (26)	68 (20)	101 (38)
Mean maximum °F (°C)	55.1 (12.8)	53.1 (11.7)	64.0 (17.8)	79.7 (26.5)	86.1 (30.1)	91.0 (32.8)	91.9 (33.3)	90.8 (32.7)	87.9 (31.1)	78.6 (25.9)	68.1 (20.1)	56.7 (13.7)	93.9 (34.4)
Mean daily maximum °F (°C)	31.3 (−0.4)	33.4 (0.8)	41.6 (5.3)	55.2 (12.9)	68.6 (20.3)	76.9 (24.9)	81.1 (27.3)	79.7 (26.5)	72.4 (22.4)	59.4 (15.2)	47.5 (8.6)	36.8 (2.7)	57.0 (13.9)
Daily mean °F (°C)	23.3 (−4.8)	24.7 (−4.1)	32.1 (0.1)	44.6 (7.0)	56.9 (13.8)	66.2 (19.0)	70.7 (21.5)	69.1 (20.6)	61.9 (16.6)	50.3 (10.2)	39.5 (4.2)	29.9 (−1.2)	47.4 (8.6)
Mean daily minimum °F (°C)	15.4 (−9.2)	16.0 (−8.9)	22.7 (−5.2)	34.0 (1.1)	45.2 (7.3)	55.4 (13.0)	60.4 (15.8)	58.5 (14.7)	51.5 (10.8)	41.2 (5.1)	31.6 (−0.2)	23.1 (−4.9)	37.9 (3.3)
Mean minimum °F (°C)	−5.5 (−20.8)	−2.7 (−19.3)	3.7 (−15.7)	21.7 (−5.7)	31.2 (−0.4)	41.5 (5.3)	49.2 (9.6)	48.1 (8.9)	37.5 (3.1)	27.9 (−2.3)	16.5 (−8.6)	4.2 (−15.4)	−8.9 (−22.7)
Record low °F (°C)	−20 (−29)	−32 (−36)	−16 (−27)	6 (−14)	25 (−4)	33 (1)	40 (4)	39 (4)	28 (−2)	16 (−9)	−1 (−18)	−21 (−29)	−32 (−36)
Average precipitation inches (mm)	2.93 (74)	2.48 (63)	3.23 (82)	3.68 (93)	3.77 (96)	4.10 (104)	4.31 (109)	4.26 (108)	3.87 (98)	4.47 (114)	3.59 (91)	3.57 (91)	44.26 (1,124)
Average snowfall inches (cm)	29.1 (74)	25.9 (66)	17.2 (44)	3.1 (7.9)	0.2 (0.51)	0.0 (0.0)	0.0 (0.0)	0.0 (0.0)	0.0 (0.0)	0.4 (1.0)	8.8 (22)	24.7 (63)	101.6 (258)
Average precipitation days (≥ 0.01 in)	19.0	15.6	14.6	15.2	14.3	13.6	12.7	11.6	10.8	17.2	16.0	19.6	180.2
Average snowy days (≥ 0.1 in)	13.9	12.1	7.1	2.0	0.2	0.0	0.0	0.0	0.0	0.5	4.6	11.9	52.3
Source: NOAA

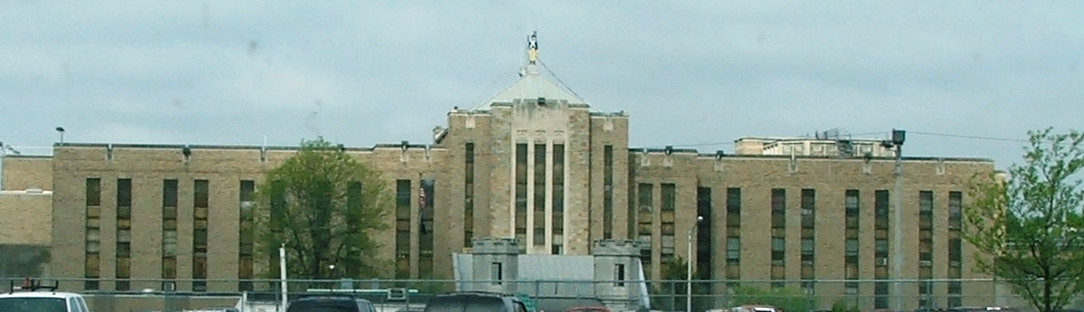
Auburn Correctional Facility

== Demographics ==
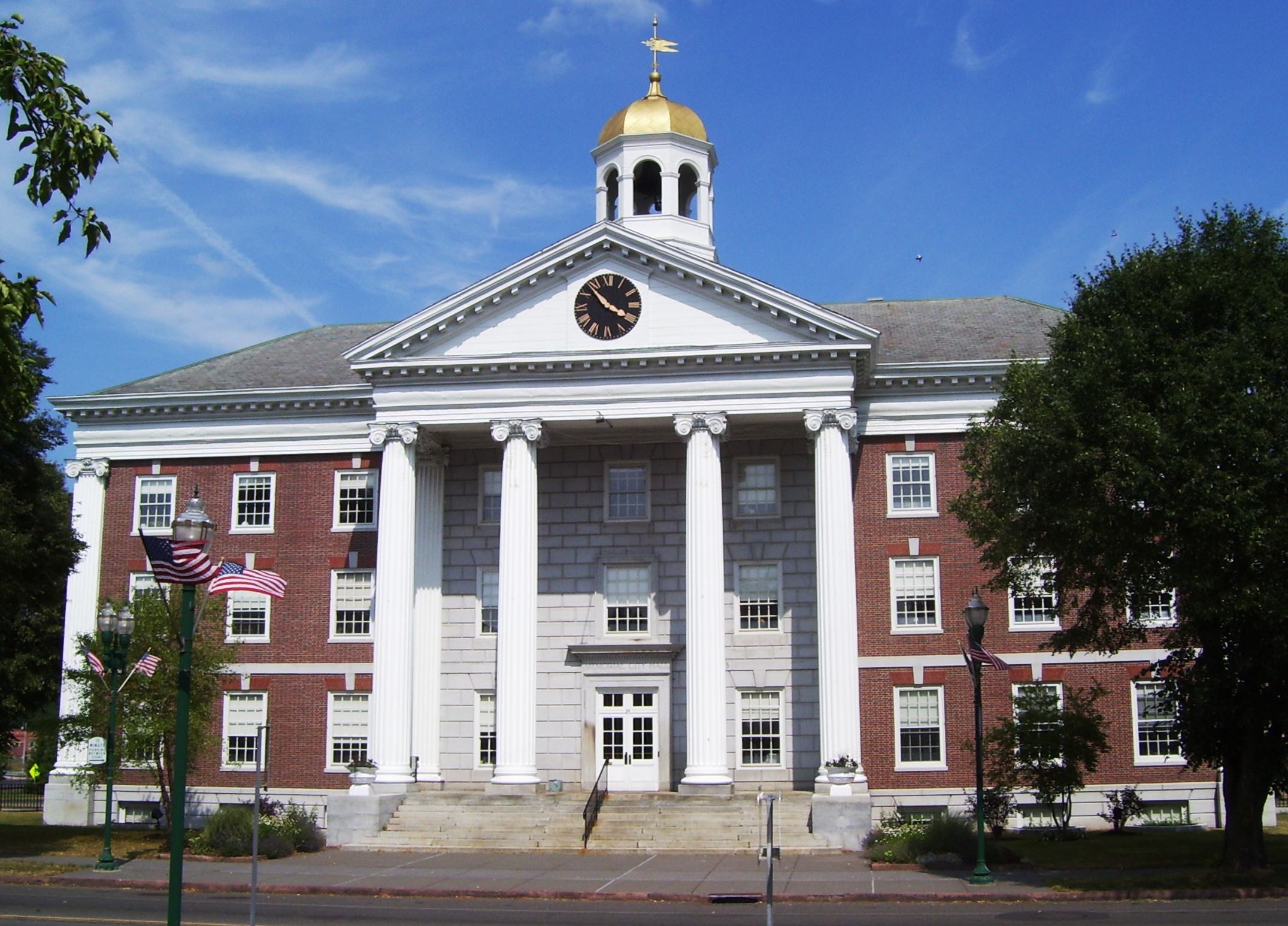
Auburn Memorial City Hall in 2012

Historical population
Census	Pop.	Note	%±
1810	500		—
1820	2,333		366.6%
1830	4,486		92.3%
1840	5,626		25.4%
1850	9,548		69.7%
1860	10,986		15.1%
1870	17,225		56.8%
1880	21,924		27.3%
1890	25,858		17.9%
1900	30,345		17.4%
1910	34,668		14.2%
1920	36,192		4.4%
1930	36,652		1.3%
1940	35,753		−2.5%
1950	36,722		2.7%
1960	35,249		−4.0%
1970	34,599		−1.8%
1980	32,548		−5.9%
1990	31,258		−4.0%
2000	28,574		−8.6%
2010	27,687		−3.1%
2020	26,866		−3.0%
U.S. Decennial Census

=== 2020 census ===
As of the 2020 census, Auburn had a population of 26,866. The median age was 40.5 years. 20.0% of residents were under the age of 18 and 19.3% of residents were 65 years of age or older. For every 100 females there were 100.3 males, and for every 100 females age 18 and over there were 98.6 males age 18 and over.

99.7% of residents lived in urban areas, while 0.3% lived in rural areas.

There were 11,652 households in Auburn, of which 25.2% had children under the age of 18 living in them. Of all households, 27.7% were married-couple households, 24.4% were households with a male householder and no spouse or partner present, and 36.7% were households with a female householder and no spouse or partner present. About 40.7% of all households were made up of individuals and 17.2% had someone living alone who was 65 years of age or older.

There were 12,948 housing units, of which 10.0% were vacant. The homeowner vacancy rate was 1.8% and the rental vacancy rate was 7.2%.

Racial composition as of the 2020 census
Race	Number	Percent
White	21,991	81.9%
Black or African American	2,128	7.9%
American Indian and Alaska Native	117	0.4%
Asian	188	0.7%
Native Hawaiian and Other Pacific Islander	12	0.0%
Some other race	346	1.3%
Two or more races	2,084	7.8%
Hispanic or Latino (of any race)	1,089	4.1%

=== 2000 census ===
As of the census of 2000, there were 28,574 people, 11,411 households, and 6,538 families residing in the city. The population density was 3,405.3 inhabitants per square mile (1,314.8/km^{2}). There were 12,637 housing units at an average density of 1,506.0 per square mile (581.5/km^{2}). The racial makeup of the city was 88.57% White, 7.59% African American, 0.29% Native American, 0.57% Asian, 0.02% Pacific Islander, 1.41% from other races, and 1.55% from two or more races. Hispanic or Latino people of any race were 2.82% of the population.

There were 11,411 households, out of which 28.1% had children under the age of 18 living with them, 37.3% were married couples living together, 14.7% had a female householder with no partner present, and 42.7% were non-families. 36.3% of all households were made up of individuals, and 16.6% had someone living alone who was 65 years of age or older. The average household size was 2.27 and the average family size was 2.98.

In the city, the population was spread out, with 22.8% under the age of 18, 9.3% from 18 to 24, 30.3% from 25 to 44, 19.8% from 45 to 64, and 17.8% who were 65 years of age or older. The median age was 37 years. For every 100 females, there were 99.0 males. For every 100 females age 18 and over, there were 97.8 males.

The median income for a household in the city was $30,281, and the median income for a family was $41,169. Males had a median income of $32,349 versus $23,330 for females. The per capita income for the city was $17,083. About 12.5% of families and 16.5% of the population were below the poverty line, including 23.9% of those under age 18 and 10.2% of those age 65 or over.

== Education ==
The Auburn Enlarged City School District is the public school system including almost all of the city of Auburn. It currently operates seven schools covering grades K–12. West Middle School was closed over the summer of 2011 to save funds, with the student population merged into East Middle School.

A small piece of Auburn is in the Port Byron Central School District.

The only college in Auburn is Cayuga Community College, a two-year school. C.C.C., as it is known locally, is located on Franklin Street. The city had been the home of Auburn Theological Seminary, a Presbyterian institution established in 1818, which relocated to New York City in 1939.

== Sports ==
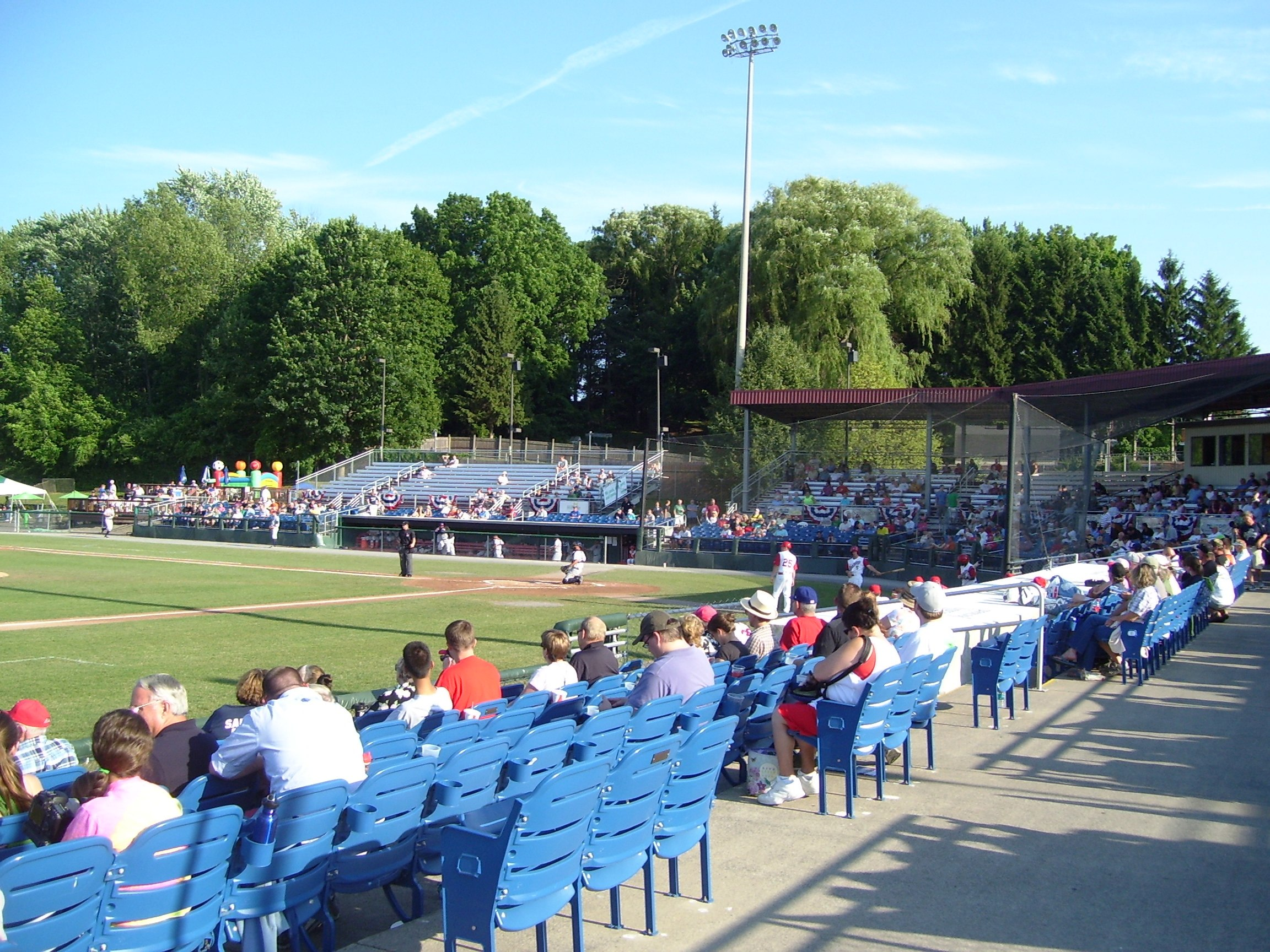
An Auburn Doubledays game (2012)

=== Professional baseball ===
Auburn has had a long association with professional baseball. The Auburn Cayugas and other early Auburn teams played as members of the League Alliance (1877), Central New York League (1888), New York State League (1889, 1897–1899), Empire State League (1906–1907), Canadian–American League (1938, 1940) and Border League (1946–1951). Auburn was an affiliate of the Boston Red Sox (1948).

Today, Auburn is home to the Auburn Doubledays, members of the collegiate wooden bat Perfect Game Collegiate Baseball League.

==== National Association of Professional Baseball Leagues ====
In late 1901, Auburn became the headquarters of the National Association of Professional Baseball Leagues (NAPBL), which is now known simply as Minor League Baseball and based in St. Petersburg, Florida. John H. Farrell, who served as secretary-treasurer of the league for many years, was a local resident, and the league's offices remained in the city while he remained in that role.

==== Auburn Community Baseball ====
Auburn Community Baseball, which is owned by the City of Auburn, is the parent organization of the Auburn Doubledays and its predecessor Auburn entries in the Class A short-season New York–Penn League dating back to 1958. The team plays its home games at Leo Pinckney Field at Falcon Park. Until 2020 they were members of the New York-Penn League.

=== The Great Race ===
Since 1978, on the second Sunday of every August, Auburn has hosted "The Great Race", a three- or four-person relay race involving running, cycling, and canoeing (or kayaking). The race begins and ends in the area of Owasco Lake on the southern outskirts of Auburn. With between 2,000 and 2,500 people participating in an average year, it is one of the largest relay races in the United States.

== Media ==
The daily newspaper published in Auburn is The Citizen, which dates back to 1816, and had previously been published as The Daily Advertiser and The Citizen-Advertiser. It serves Auburn and Cayuga County, as well as other parts of Central New York. A morning paper, published seven days a week, it has a circulation of 10,000 for the daily and Saturday editions, and 12,000 on Sunday. It is owned by Lee Enterprises.

== Notable people ==
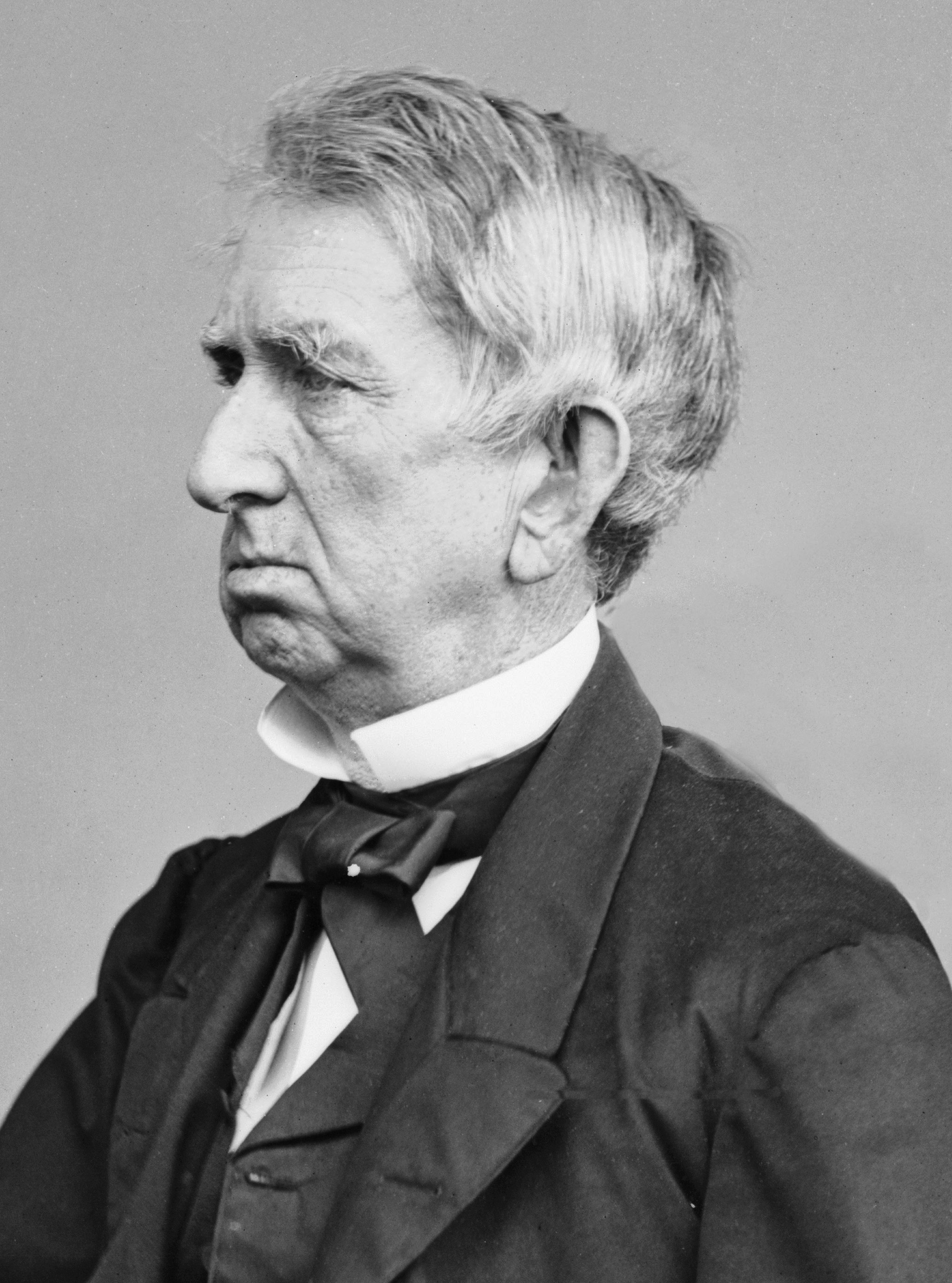
William H. Seward

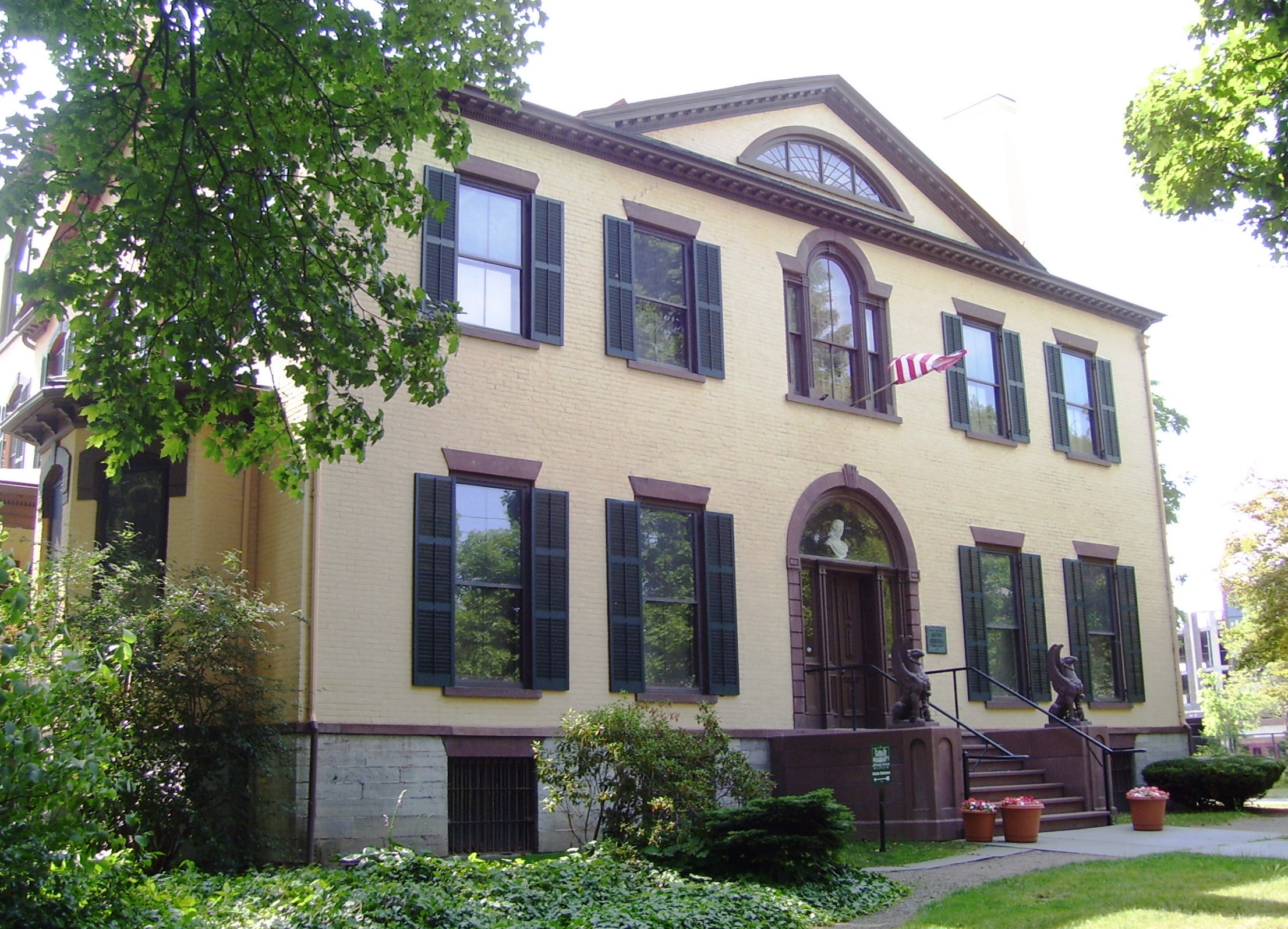
William H. Seward House (2012)

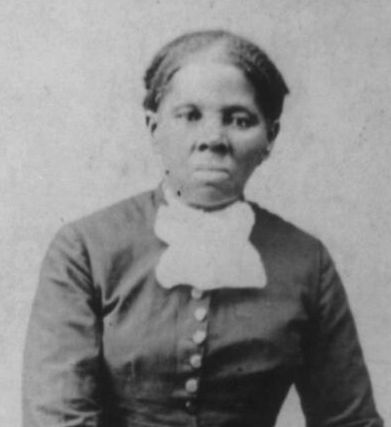
Harriet Tubman

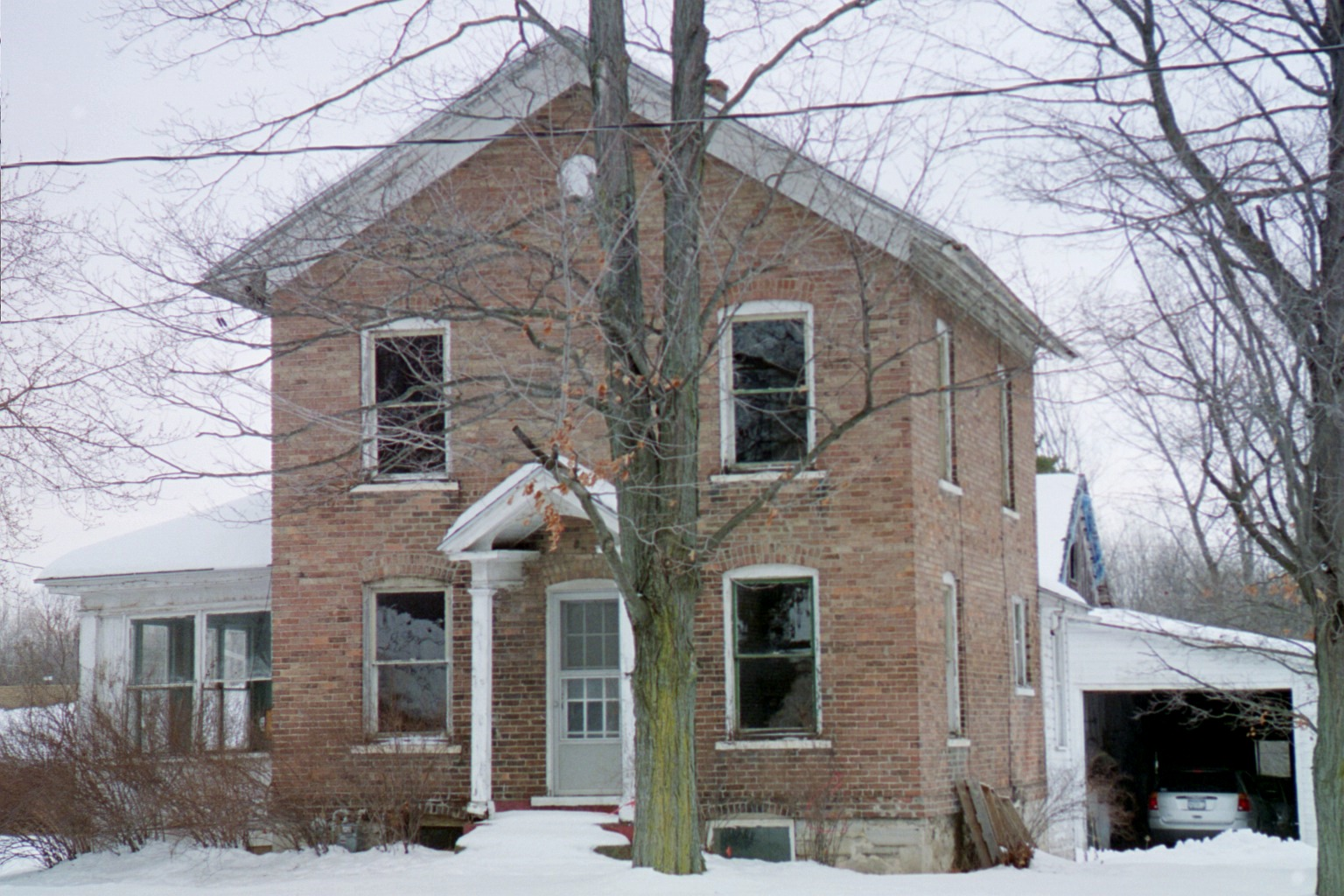
Harriet Tubman House (2007)

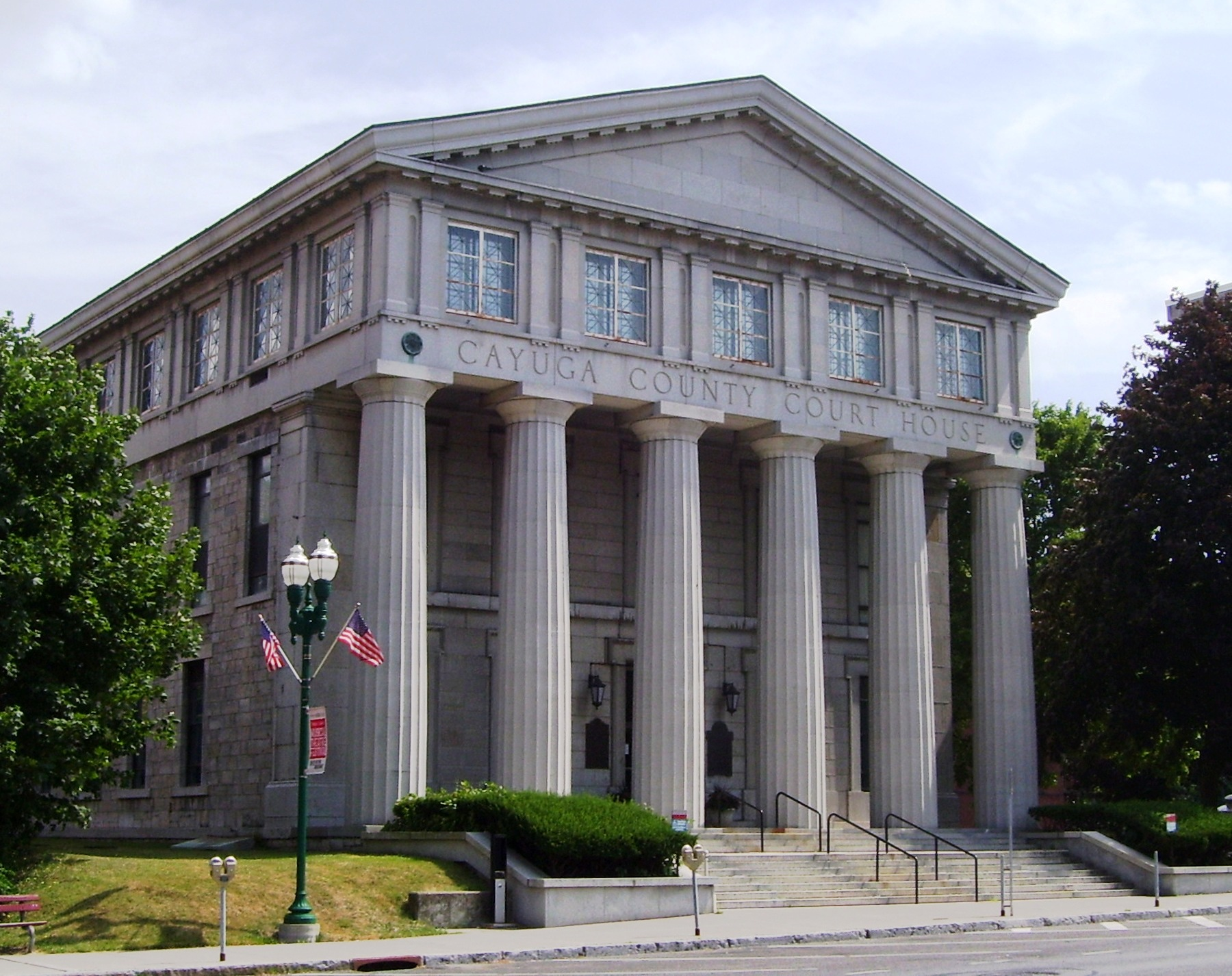
Cayuga County Court House

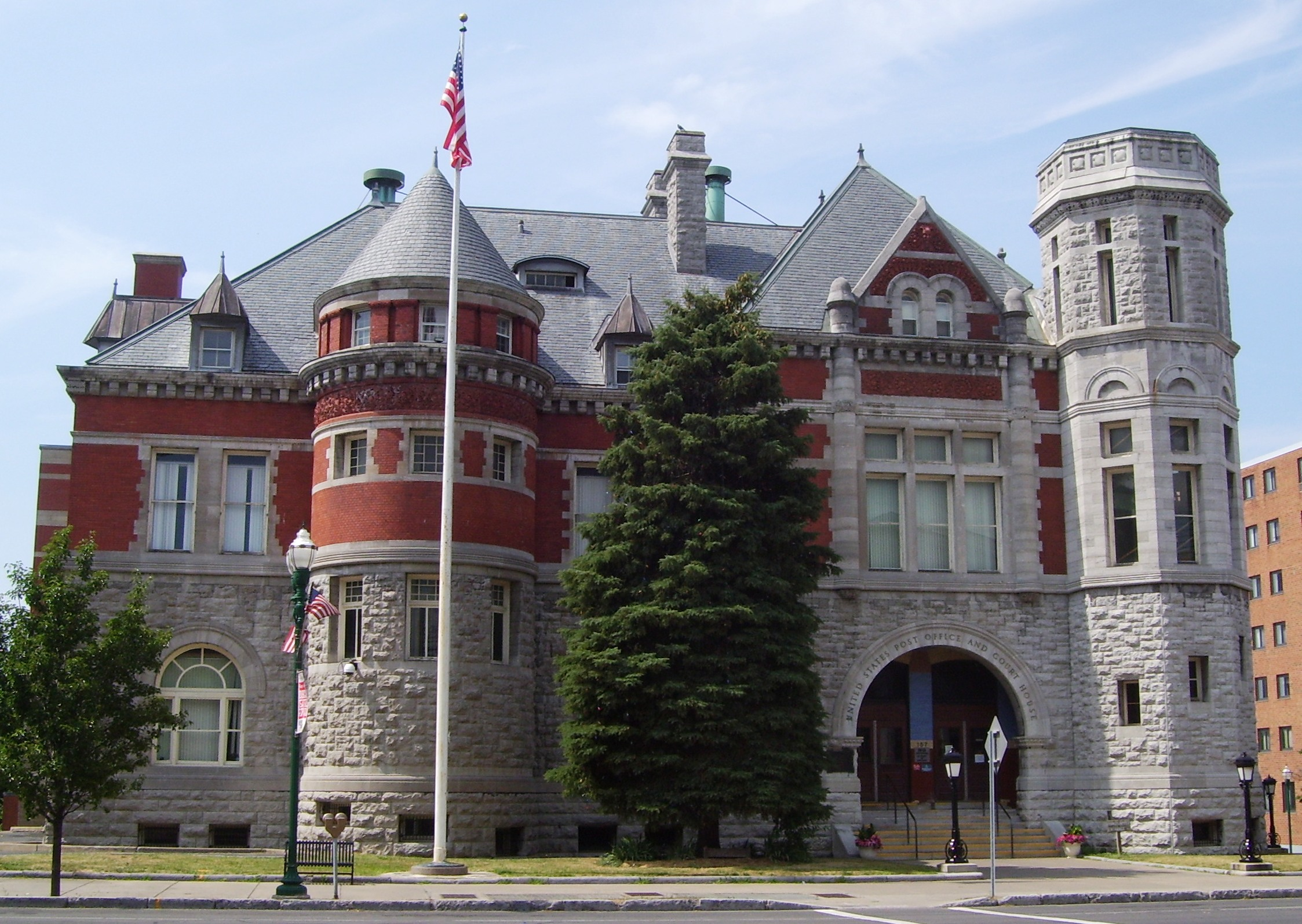
Old Post Office and Federal Courthouse

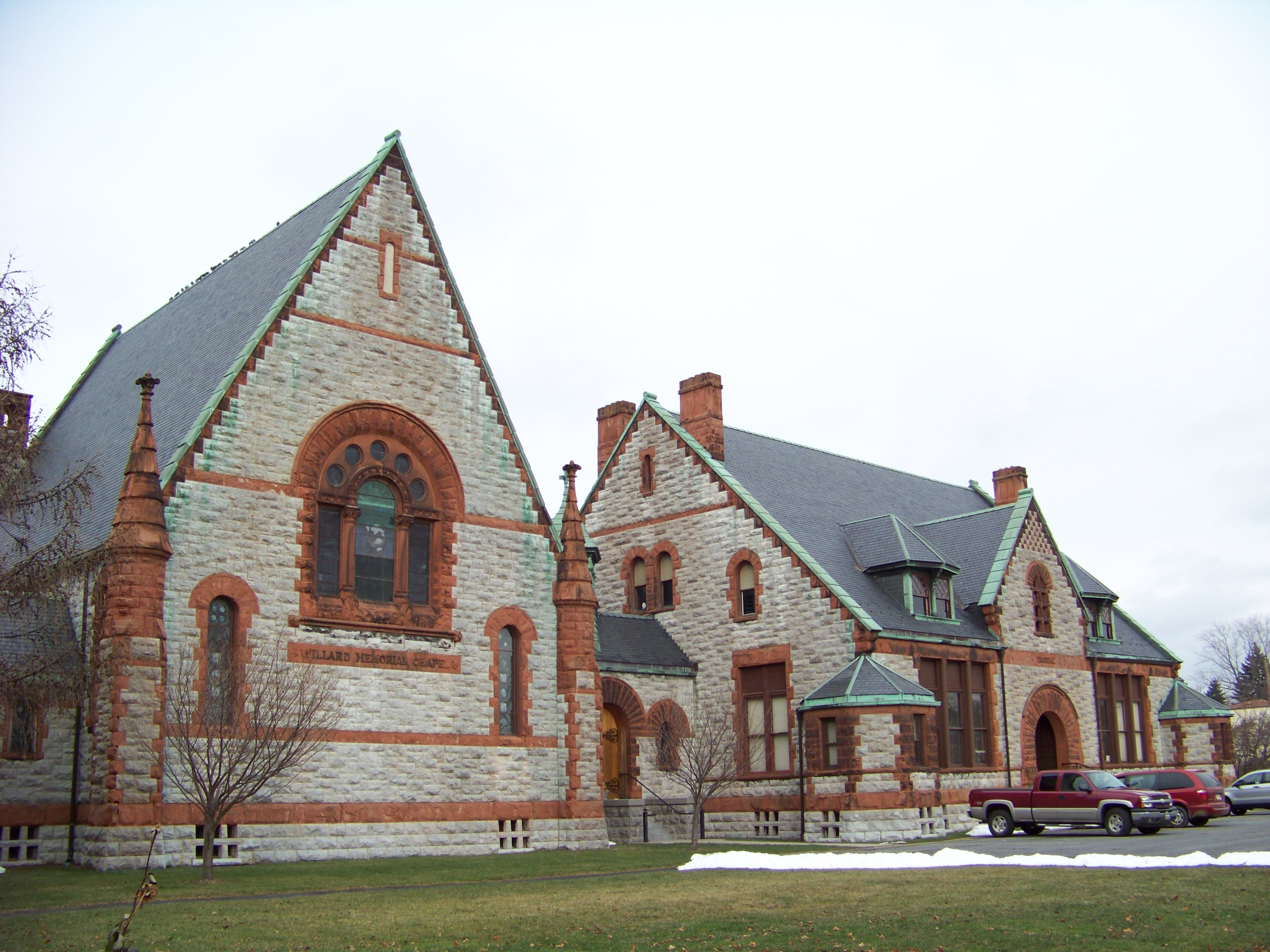
Willard Memorial Chapel

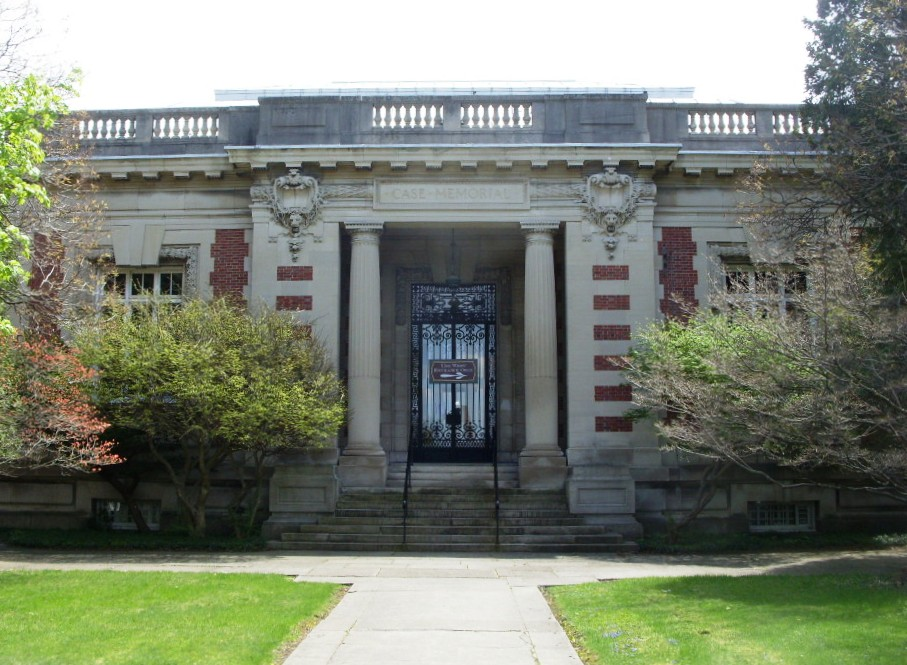
Case Memorial-Seymour Library

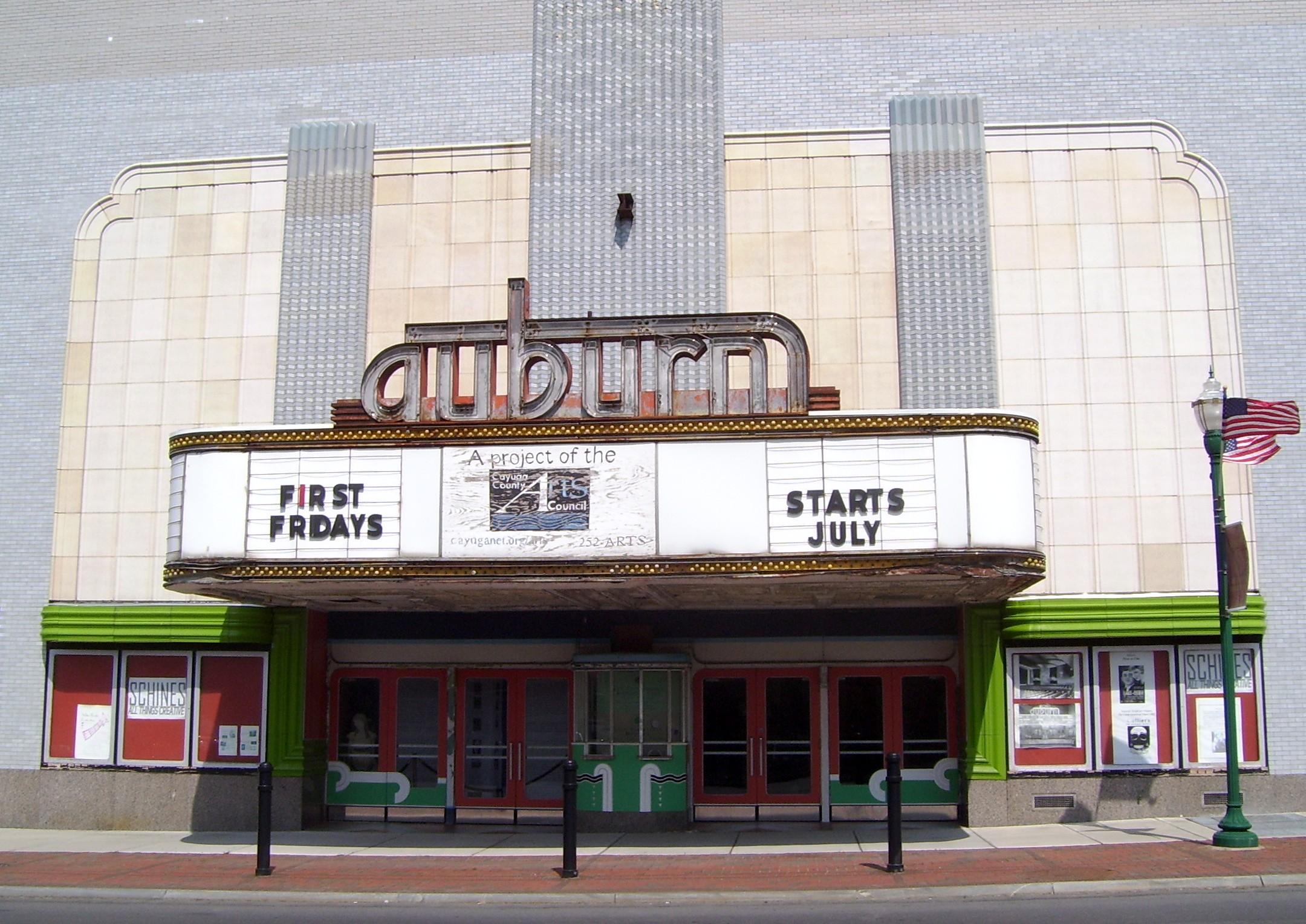
Schines Auburn Theatre

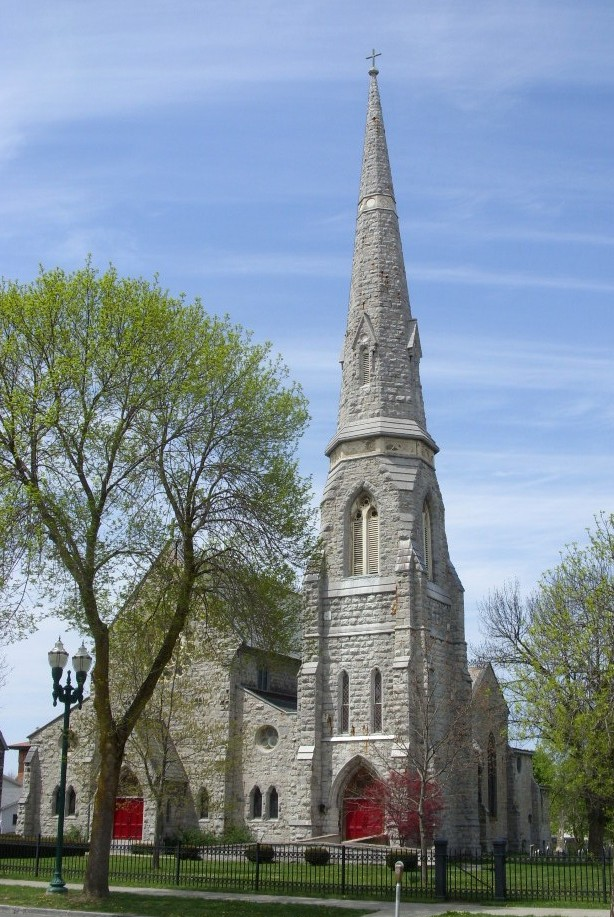
Saints Peter and John Episcopal Church

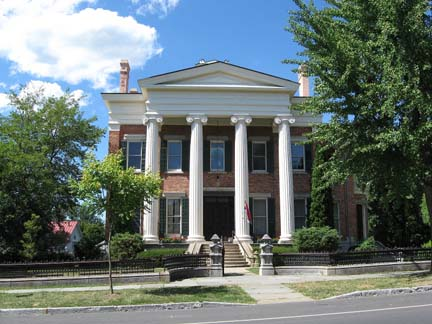
Cayuga Museum of History and Art

Possibly the two best-known historical figures associated with Auburn are Harriet Tubman and William H. Seward.

Seward, who served as a New York state senator, the governor of New York, a U.S. senator, a presidential candidate, and then Secretary of State under presidents Abraham Lincoln and Andrew Johnson – in which role he negotiated the 1867 purchase from Russia of Alaska, which became known as "Seward's Folly" – lived in Auburn from 1823 until his death in 1872, and was opposed to slavery. Seward's wife, Frances Adeline Seward, was deeply committed to the abolitionist movement, which was strongly supported in Auburn. In the 1850s, the Seward family opened their Auburn home as a safehouse to fugitive slaves on the Underground Railroad. In 1859 Seward sold a plot of land to abolitionist Tubman, who used it to create a safe haven for her family and friends and other black Americans seeking a better life in the north. Seward's house is now a historical museum, and both it and Tubman's house are on the National Register of Historic Places.

=== Business and inventors ===
- Willard Bundy, invented the first time clock
- Theodore Case, developed the first commercially successful system of recording sound on film
- Jerome H. Holland, the first African-American board member of the American Stock Exchange
- Birdsill Holly, supposed inventor of the fire hydrant
- Phil Romano, restaurateur, founder of Fuddruckers and Romano's Macaroni Grill

=== Government, politics, and law ===
- Harry Elmer Barnes, historian, scholar and social scientist
- John Beardsley (1783–1857), judge, assemblyman, state senator and warden of Auburn state prison
- Samuel Blatchford, Associate Justice of the United States Supreme Court
- William H. Carpenter, U.S. Consul to Fuzhou, China, 1861–1865
- William Miller Collier, diplomat, attorney, president of George Washington University, author of Collier on Bankruptcy
- Alfred Conkling Coxe Sr., federal judge
- Amy Dacey, Democratic National Committee, CEO
- Ulysses F. Doubleday, congressman, father of Abner Doubleday
- Eleanor Lansing Dulles, diplomat
- Nathaniel B. Eldredge, congressman
- William Fulton, author, urban planner, 52nd mayor of Ventura, California
- Milo Goodrich, congressman
- Jerome Holland, first African American ambassador to a European nation (Sweden, 1972); president of Hampton University
- Thomas Y. Howe, Jr., mayor and congressman
- James Lockhart, congressman from Indiana
- Virginia V. Lyons, politician
- Clinton D. MacDougall, congressman
- Truman A. Merriman, congressman
- Lithgow Osborne, diplomat, first American ambassador to Norway after World War II
- Thomas Mott Osborne, prison reformer
- Sereno E. Payne, first House Majority Leader
- Theodore Pomeroy, Speaker of the House and mayor
- Frederick W. Seward, assistant secretary of state, son of William H. Seward
- William G. Stahlnecker, congressman
- John Taber, congressman
- Enos T. Throop, 10th Governor of New York
- Floyd K. Whittemore, Illinois state treasurer
- Martha Coffin Wright, feminist and participant in the Seneca Falls Convention

=== Military ===
- Abner Doubleday, general; for many years incorrectly credited as the creator of baseball
- Leonard E. Rea, major general in the Marine Corps during World War II
- Walter G. Robinson, Adjutant General of New York
- William H. Seward Jr., brevet brigadier general
- William J. Sharkey, naval officer
- Vincent Speranza, private during World War II and hero of the siege of Bastogne
- Robert F. Stryker, Vietnam War Medal of Honor recipient

=== Sports, arts, and entertainment ===
- Eric Adams (real name Louis Marullo), Manowar singer
- Samuel Hopkins Adams, author
- Ryan Birchard, professional baseball pitcher
- Kelly Brannigan, model (Deal or No Deal)
- John Chester Buttre, artist and publisher of The American Portrait Gallery
- Scott Columbus, Manowar drummer
- Earl Conrad (birth name Eli Cohen), journalist, author
- Richard and John Contiguglia, twin pianists
- Joey DeMaio, Manowar bassist
- Greg Downing, lacrosse player
- Charles Loring Elliott, portrait painter
- Joey Foster Ellis, artist
- Michelle Feldman, ten-pin bowler
- Buddy Hardeman, football running back
- Raymond Hitchcock, actor
- Mark Jindrak, ex-WWE wrestler
- Joe Kehoskie, baseball agent
- Julia Kirtland, distance runner
- Bucky Lawless, boxer (real name Thomas Lawless)
- Tim Locastro, Major League Baseball player
- John, Mike, and Tom Mansell, major league baseball players
- Marijane Meaker, award-winning author of young adult fiction (as "M.E. Kerr")
- Pete Mendillo, musician, drummer
- T. J. Middleton, tennis player
- Jeremy Morin, NHL player
- Bob Mosher, TV and film writer
- Jerry O'Neil, NASCAR driver
- Jane Peyton, actress wife of Samuel Hopkins Adams
- Kevin Polcovich, Major League Baseball player
- Greg Sankey, commissioner, Southeastern Conference
- Julius Schweinfurth, architect
- Stanley Shakespeare, NFL player
- Sir James Jebusa Shannon, artist
- Emma Paddock Telford, writer
- Alexander Theobald Van Laer, painter
- John Walsh, host of America's Most Wanted and The Hunt with John Walsh
- Thommie Walsh, dancer, choreographer and director

=== Other ===
- Ken Taylor, football, wrestling, track athlete AHS class of 1962. First person to receive automatic implantable cardio defibrillator (AICD) 1984.
- Avery Robert Dulles, Cardinal and theologian
- Theodore Frelinghuysen Dwight (1846–1917), editor, writer, archivist, bibliographer and U.S. diplomat
- William Kemmler, Auburn Prison inmate, first person executed by electric chair
- Michael Lynch (born 1951), geneticist
- Harriet Mann Miller (1831–1918), writer, ornithologist
- Paul Douglas Parkman (1932-2024), one of the developers of the rubella vaccine
- Irene Sargent (1852–1932), American art historian
- Frederick Starr, professor and anthropologist
- Annie Edson Taylor, the first person to survive a trip over Niagara Falls in a barrel

== Business and economy ==
- Auburn Bearing & Manufacturing (1898), designer and manufacturer of ball and roller thrust bearings

== Places of historic interest ==
A number of properties in Auburn are listed on the National Register of Historic Places, including the Auburn Button Works and Logan Silk Mills, the Belt-Gaskin House, Case Memorial-Seymour Library, the Cayuga County Courthouse and Clerk's Office, the Harriet Tubman Home for the Aged, William and Mary Hosmer House, St. Peter's Episcopal Church Complex, Sand Beach Church, Schines Auburn Theatre, Thompson AME Zion Church, Harriet Tubman Grave, Harriet Tubman House, the Old Post Office and Courthouse, Fort Hill Cemetery, Wall Street Methodist Episcopal Church, and Dr. Sylvester Willard Mansion. The William H. Seward House and Willard Memorial Chapel-Welch Memorial Hall are National Historic Landmarks, and the South Street Area Historic District is a national historic district.

In 2018, the NYS Equal Rights Heritage Center opened to the public, serving as a visitors' center and permanent exhibition promoting the region's history and culture. The center guides visitors to the variety of historical sites in the region connected to the struggle for equal rights.
