= Cayuga County Courthouse and Clerk's Office =

- U.S. National Register of Historic Places
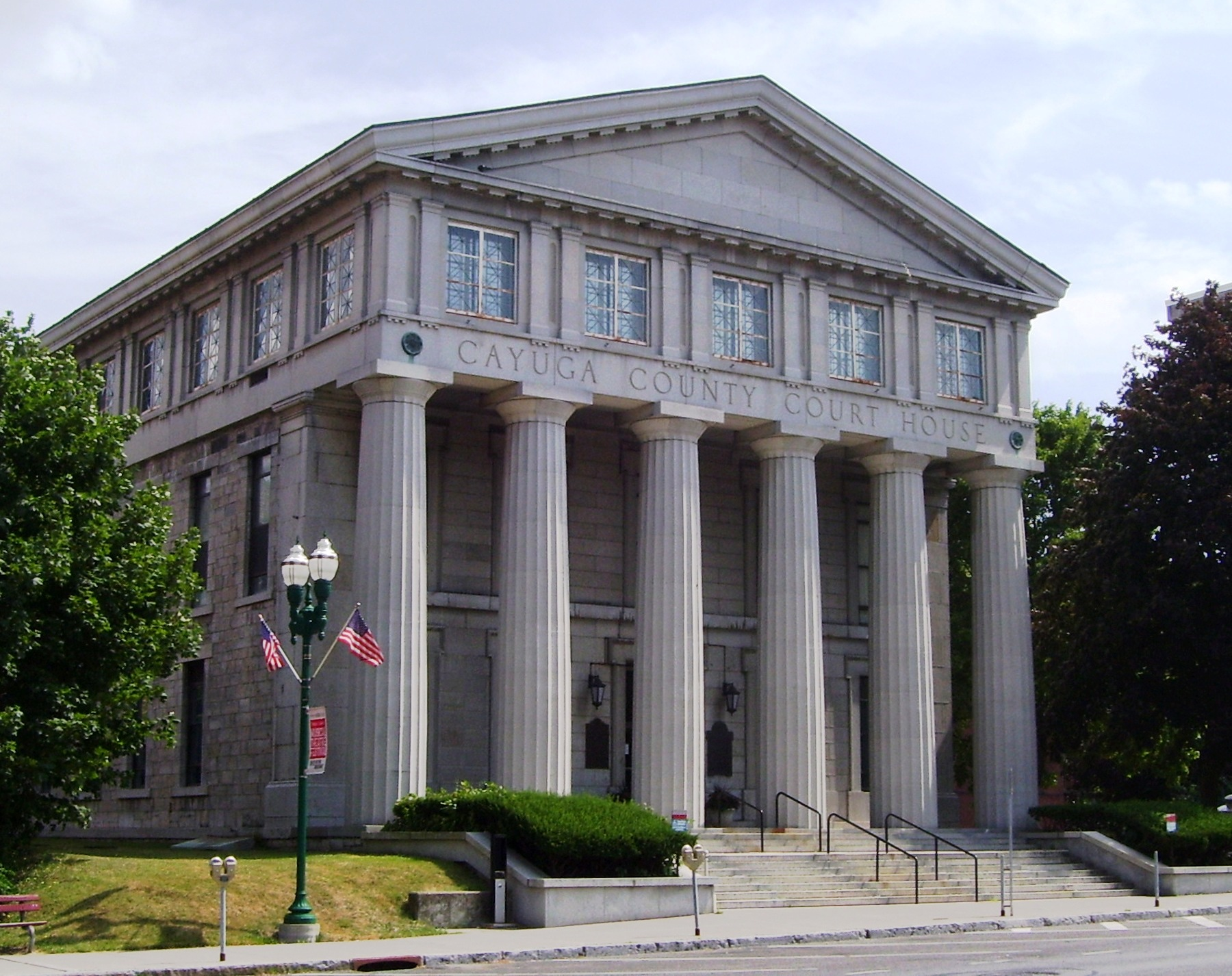
- (2012)

- Location within New York Location within the United States
- Interactive map showing the location for Cayuga County Courthouse & Clerk’s Office
- Location: 152-154 Genesee St. Auburn, New York
- Coordinates: 42°55′47″N 76°34′9″W
- Area: less than one acre
- Built: 1835-36 (original courthouse); 1882 (clerk's office); 1922-24 (rebuilt courthouse)
- Architect: John I. Hagaman (orig. courthouse); Green and Wicks (clerk's office); Carl Tallman & Samuel Tillger (rebuilt courthouse)
- Architectural style: Greek Revival orig. courthouse); Italianate (clerk's office); Classical Revival (rebuilt courthouse)
- NRHP reference No.: 91000721
- Added to NRHP: June 21, 1991

Cayuga County Courthouse and Clerk's Office is a historic courthouse complex located at 152 Genesee Street in Auburn, New York. It consists of a two building government complex. The courthouse was built in 1835–1836 to a design by John I. Hagaman in the Greek Revival style, employing a massive Greek Doric order. It was rebuilt and expanded in 1922–1924 after a fire destroyed everything but the front and side walls of the original building. The rebuilt courthouse, designed by Carl Tallman and Samuel Hillger, is a 2 1/2-story, Neoclassical temple-fronted stone building incorporating Hagaman's monumental portico. Attached to it is the 1882 County Clerk's Office building, designed by Green and Wicks in the Late Victorian Italianate style.

The complex was listed on the National Register of Historic Places in 1991.

== See also ==
- National Register of Historic Places listings in Cayuga County, New York
