= Willard Memorial Chapel-Welch Memorial Hall =

- Willard Memorial Chapel—Welch Memorial Hall
- U.S. National Register of Historic Places
- U.S. National Historic Landmark
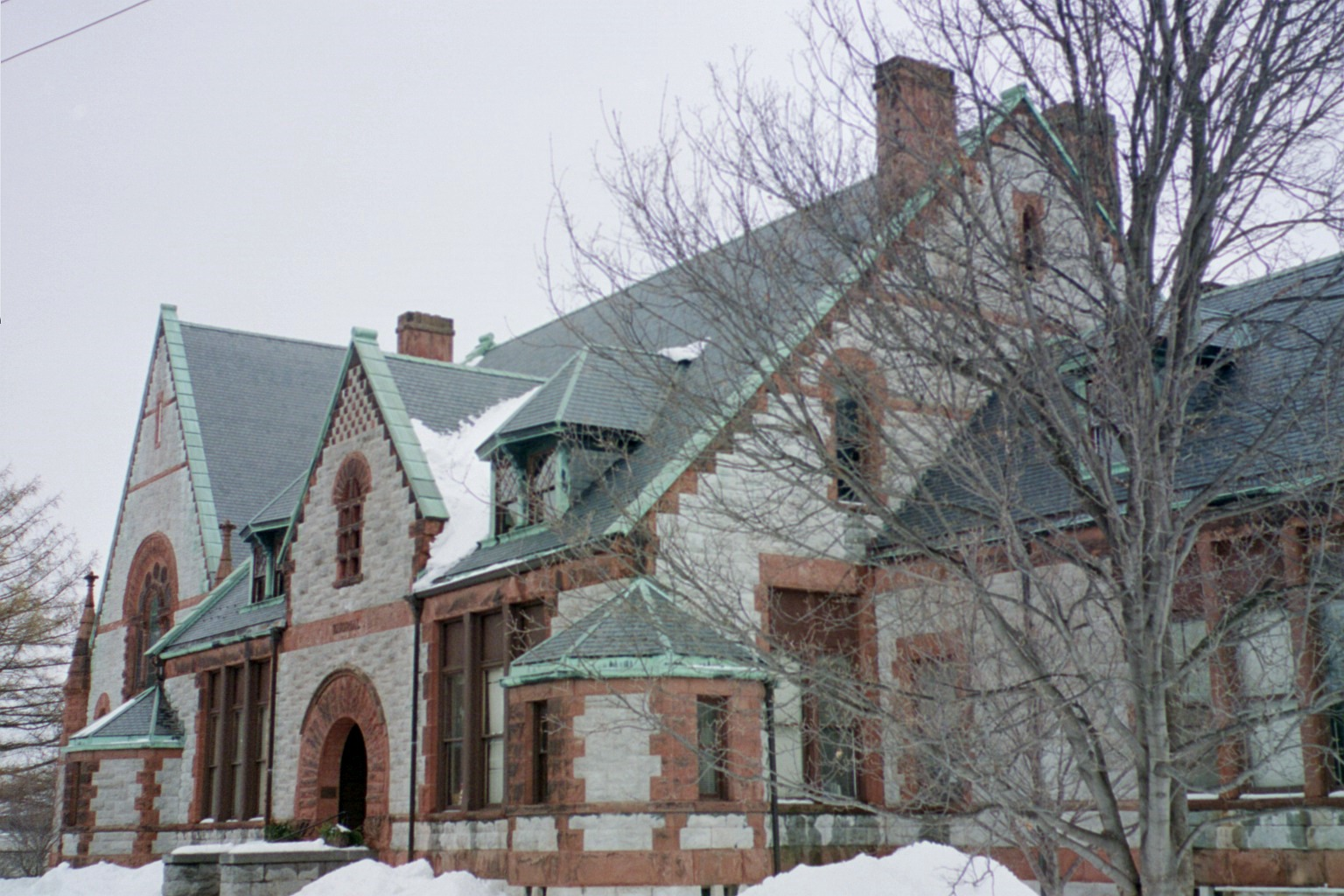

- Location within New York Location within the United States
- Location: 17–19 Nelson St., Auburn, NY
- Coordinates: 42°56′13.51″N 76°33′48.47″W
- Area: 1.4 acres (0.57 ha)
- Built: 1892–1894; 132 years ago
- Architect: Warner & Brockett; windows and interior decoration by Tiffany Glass & Decorating Co.
- Architectural style: Romanesque Revival
- NRHP reference No.: 89000461

Significant dates
- Added to NRHP: June 8, 1989
- Designated NHL: April 5, 2005

The Willard Memorial Chapel and the adjoining Welch Memorial Hall are historic conjoined buildings located at 17 Nelson Street in Auburn, Cayuga County, New York. Built 1892–1894 for the Auburn Theological Seminary, the buildings contain an ecclesiastical installation of stained glass and interior decoration by Louis Comfort Tiffany that is still in its original setting. They were declared a National Historic Landmark in 2005.

== Architecture ==
Willard Memorial Chapel and Welch Memorial Hall stand north of downtown Auburn, on the west side of Nelson Street south of Seymour Street. The block on which it stands was once almost completely occupied by the buildings of Auburn Theological Seminary, most of which have since been demolished and their sites redeveloped. The two buildings are largely independent of one another, joined together by a small hyphen, but share construction materials and architectural vocabulary. Their exterior are composed of load-bearing masonry, most of which is gray rock-faced limestone with red limestone trim. They are Richardsonian Romanesque in style, with entrances set recessed behind rounded arches. Windows are in a variety of styles, including round-arch Romanesque, lancet-style Gothic, and rectangular sash.

The chapel and hall were designed by Warner & Brockett of Rochester, New York, and were built in 1892-94. They feature the stained-glass windows and interior decoration of Louis Comfort Tiffany. They are the last surviving complete installation by Tiffany in its original location. The chapel was dedicated in memory of Dr. Sylvester Willard and his wife, Jane Frances Case Willard. Funding was provided by their daughters, Caroline and Georgiana.

== See also ==
- Dr. Sylvester Willard Mansion
- List of National Historic Landmarks in New York
- National Register of Historic Places listings in Cayuga County, New York

== Gallery ==
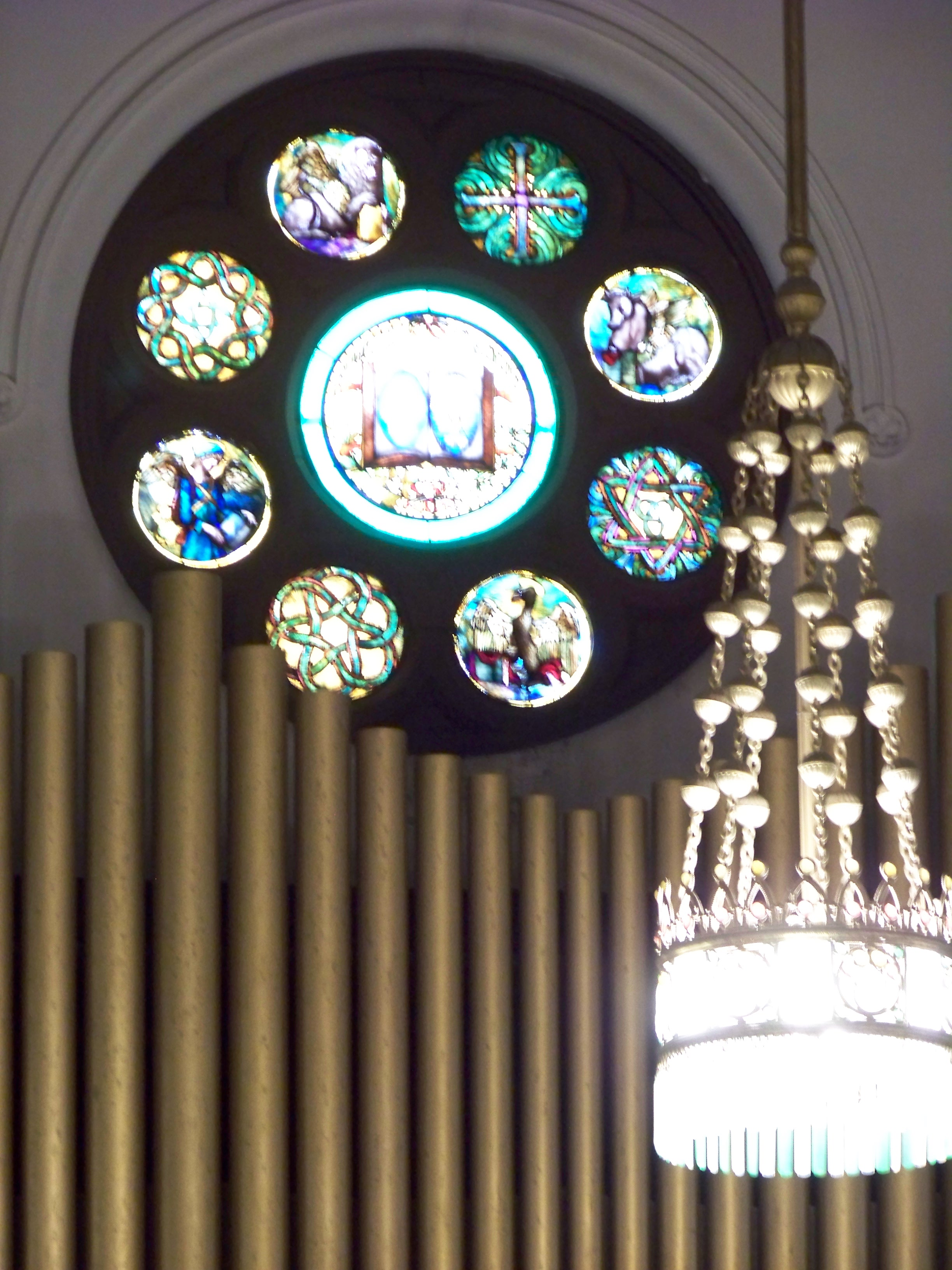
Interior, organ pipes, chandelier.

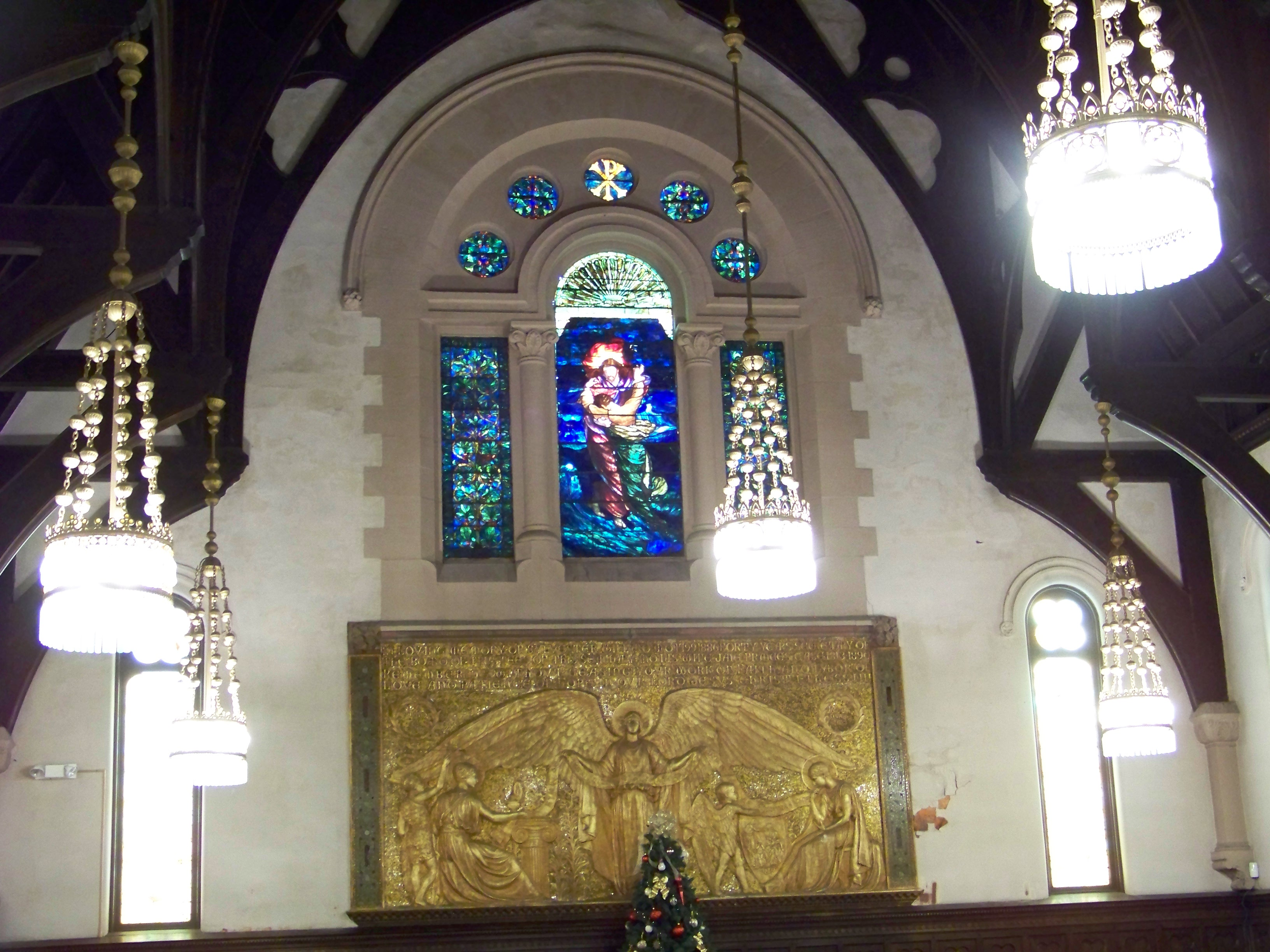
Interior, chandeliers, stained glass.

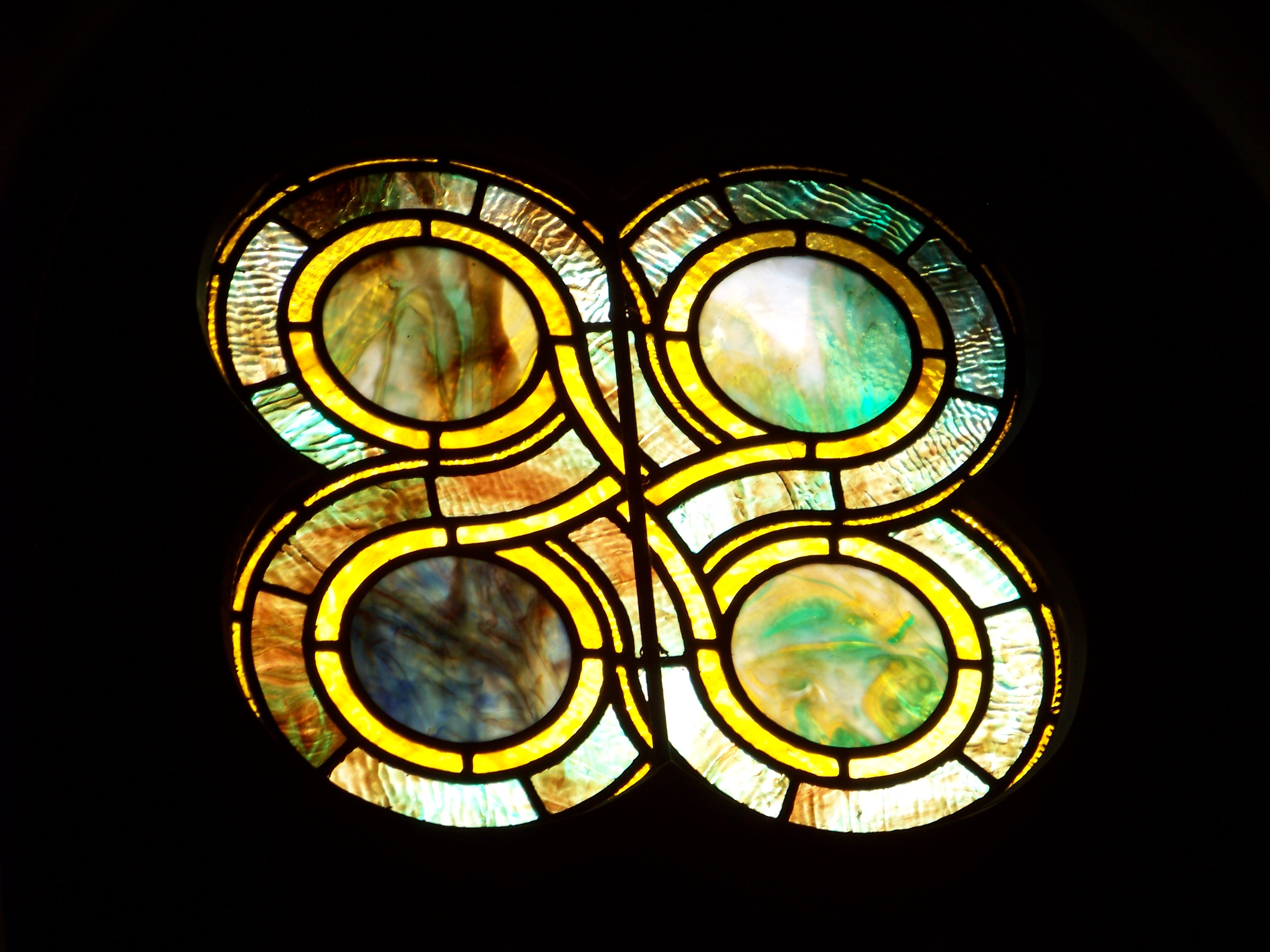
'Four Circle' window.

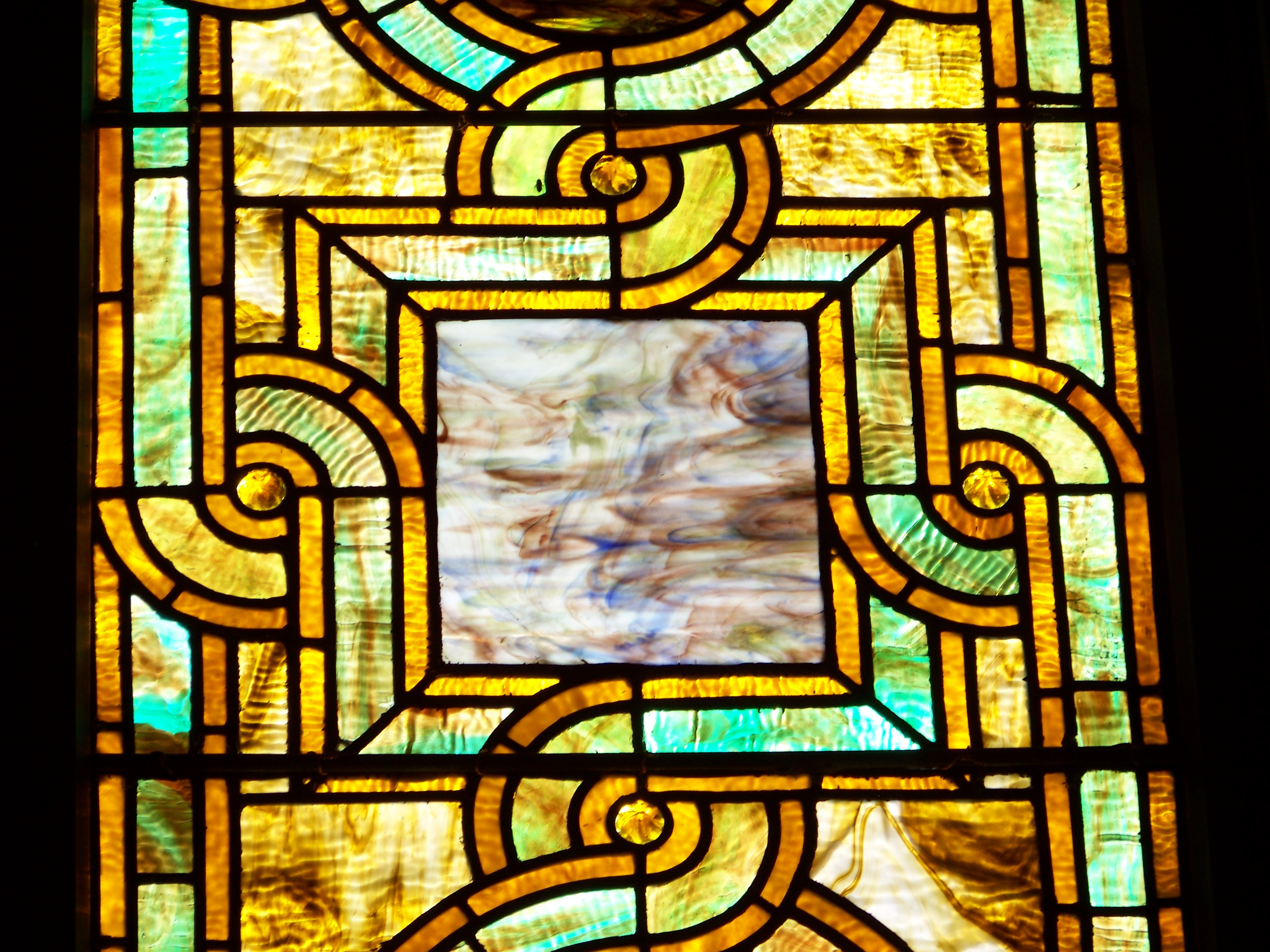
'Squares' window, detail.

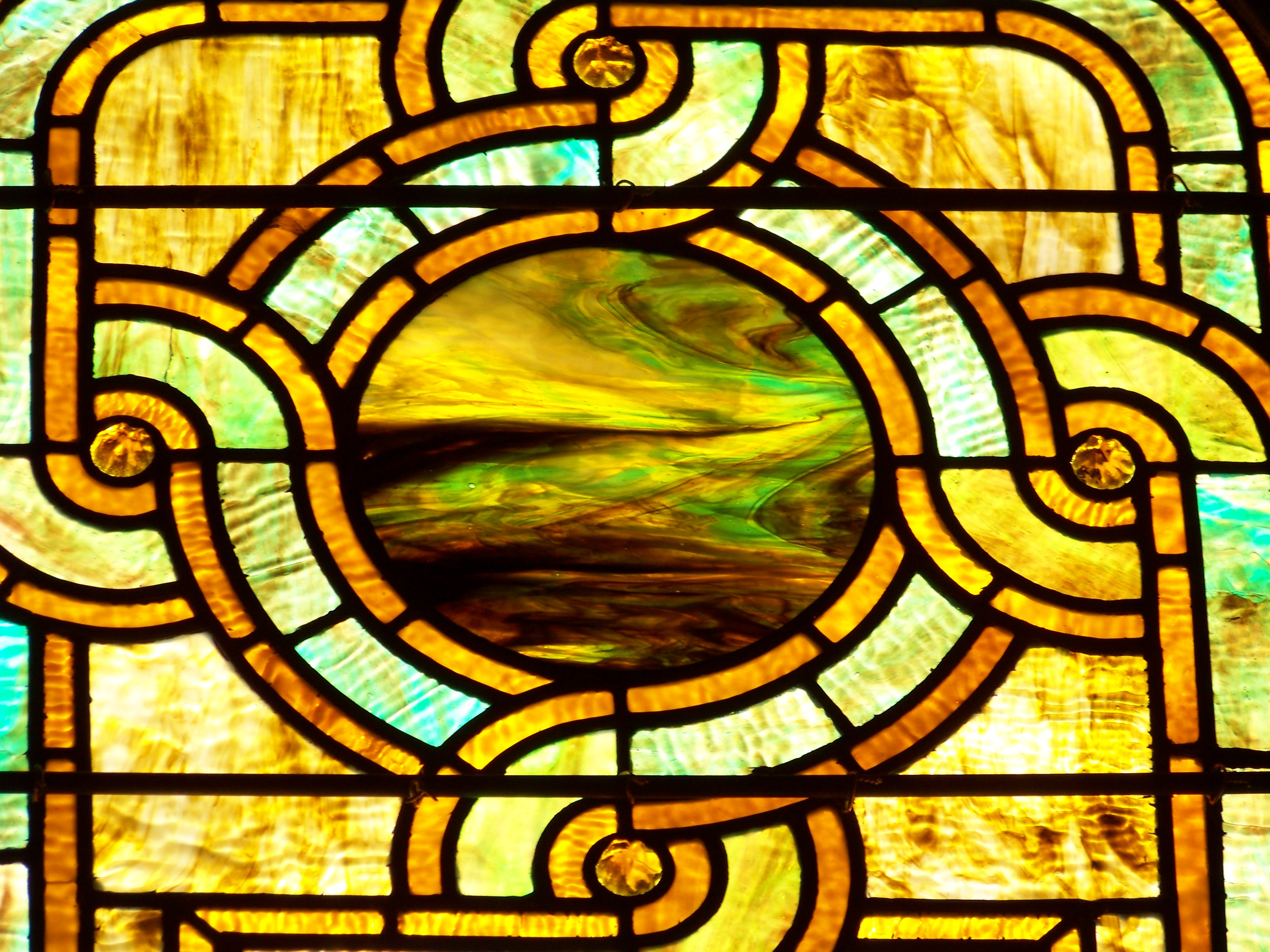
'Single Circle' window, detail.

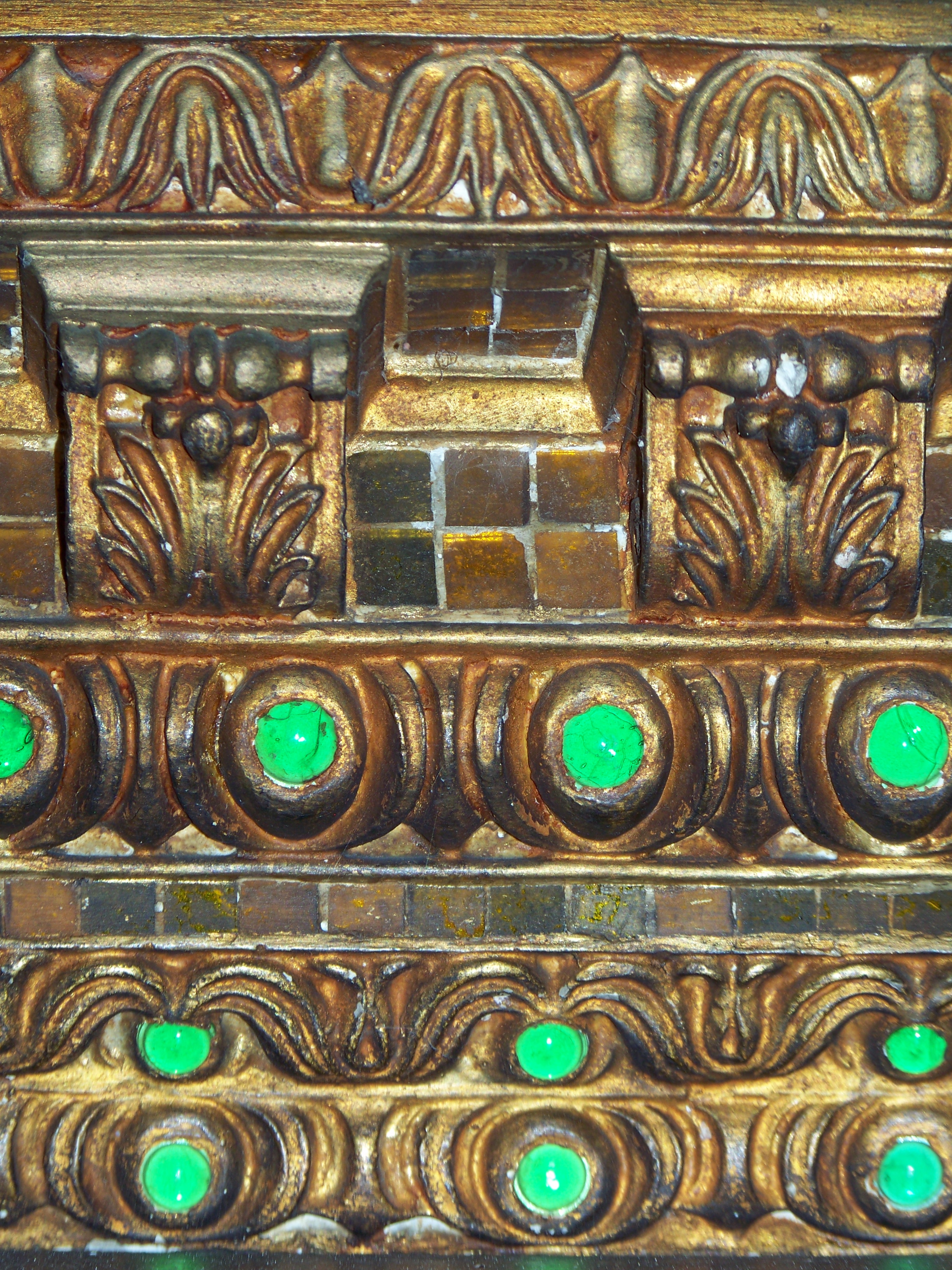
Mosaic trim details.
