= William and Mary Hosmer House =

Historic house in New York, United States

- U.S. National Register of Historic Places
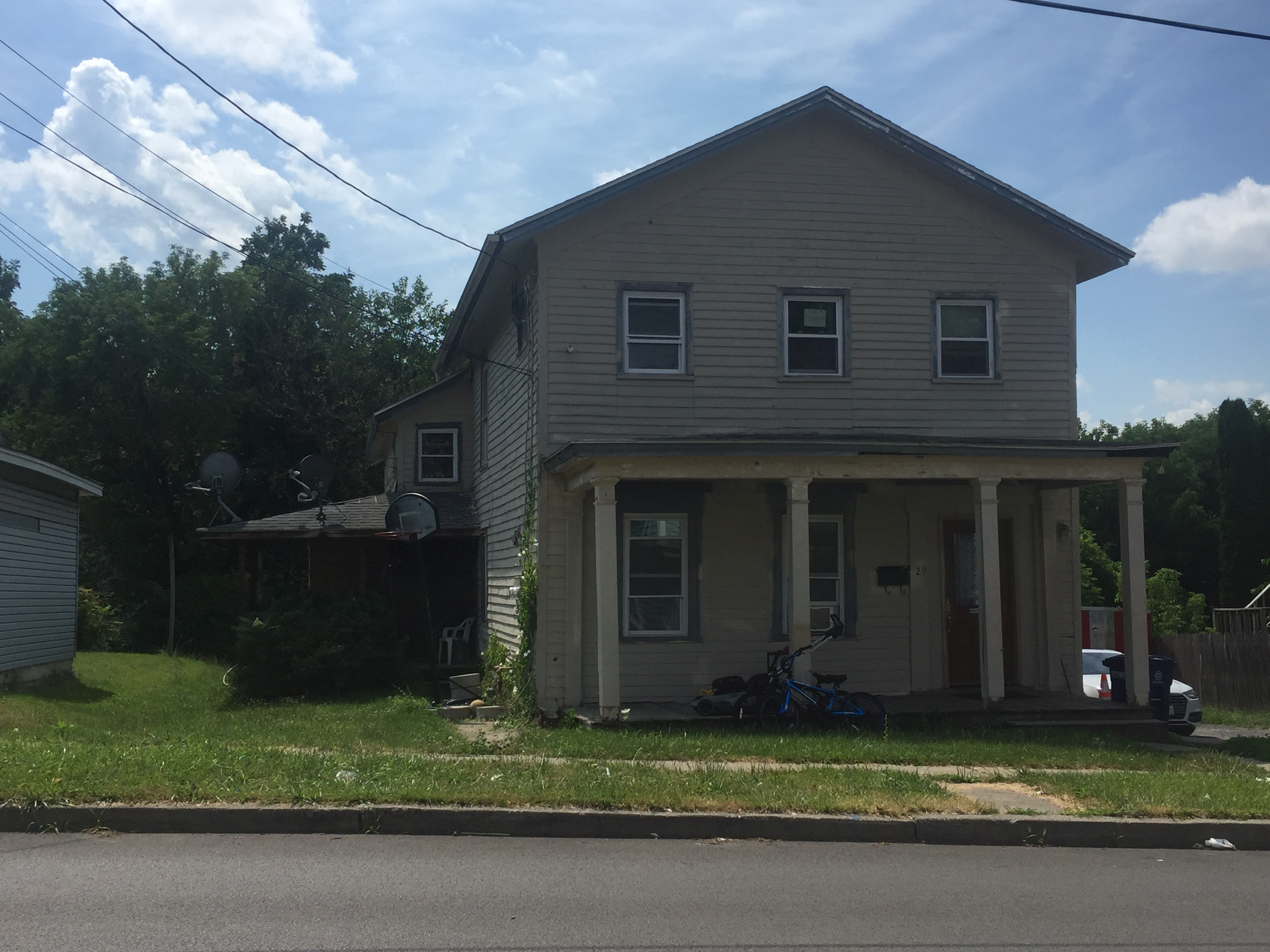

- Location within New York Location within the United States
- Location: 29 Washington St., Auburn, New York
- Coordinates: 42.92991°N 76.57600°W
- Area: less than one acre
- Built: 1851
- Architectural style: Late 19th and 20th Century Revivals
- MPS: Freedom Trail, Abolitionism, and African American Life in Central New York MPS
- NRHP reference No.: 06000262
- Added to NRHP: April 12, 2006

William and Mary Hosmer House is a historic home located in Auburn in Cayuga County, New York. It is a two-story, three-bay, side hall frame house in a vernacular Greek Revival style. It is believed to have been built in the 1840s and enlarged sometime after the conclusion of the Civil War. The house was owned by anti-slavery editor and author William Hosmer.

It was listed on the National Register of Historic Places in 2006.
