= William H. Seward House =

Historic house in New York, United States

- Seward House Museum
- U.S. National Register of Historic Places
- U.S. National Historic Landmark
- New York State Register of Historic Places
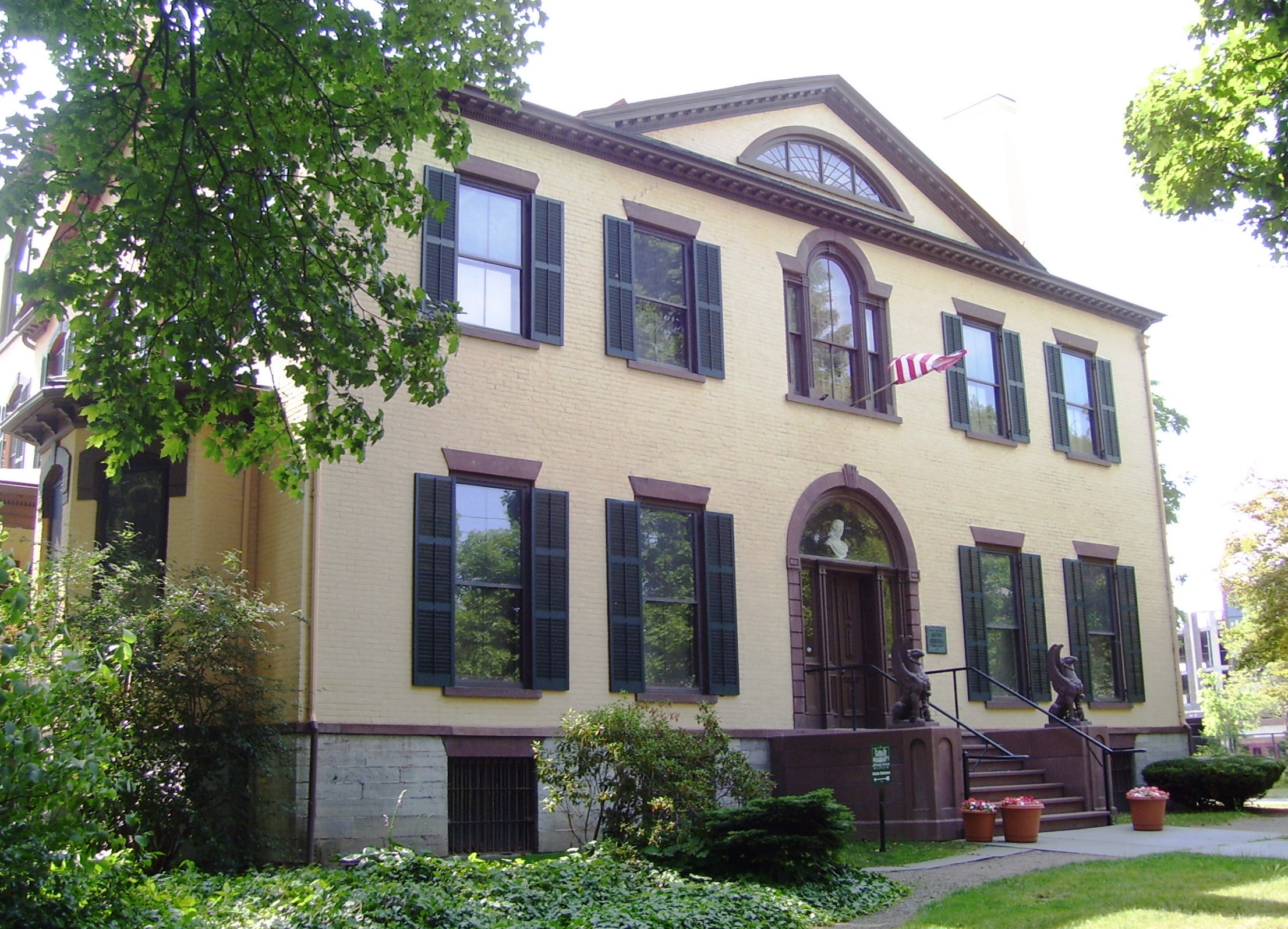

- Location within New York Location within the United States
- Interactive map showing the location of William H. Seward House Museum
- Location: 33 South St., Auburn, NY
- Coordinates: 42°55′46″N 76°33′58″W
- Area: 2.5 acres (1.0 ha)
- Built: 1816–1817
- Website: SewardHouse.Org
- NRHP reference No.: 66000504
- NYSRHP No.: 01140.001252

Significant dates
- Added to NRHP: October 15, 1966
- Designated NYSRHP: June 23, 1980

The William H. Seward House Museum is a historic house museum at 33 South Street in Auburn, New York. Built about 1816, it was the home of William H. Seward (1801–1872), who served as a New York state senator, the governor of New York, a U.S. senator, a presidential candidate, and then Secretary of State under presidents Abraham Lincoln and Andrew Johnson. The house was declared a National Historic Landmark in 1964, and added to the National Register of Historic Places on October 15, 1966. It is now maintained by a nonprofit organization as a museum dedicated to Seward's legacy. Seward's house lies on the same street at Harriet Tubman's house.

== Description ==
The Seward House is located south of the center of Auburn, on the west side of South Street opposite Grover Street. Its core element is a two-story brick structure, with a gabled roof. To this house William Seward made numerous additions, beginning with a two-story tower and wing at the west end in 1847, to which a porte-cochere and carriage house were added. In 1866, he added another narrower wing and three-story tower to the south side of the house, and additional separate carriage houses were built further south on the property.

== History ==
The core of the house was built in 1816 by Judge Elijah Miller, Seward's father-in-law. Much of the actual construction of the house was done by the carpenter John C. Jeffries as well as his apprentice Brigham Young, who later became the leader of the Church of Jesus Christ of Latter-day Saints. The house remained in the hands of Seward's descendants until 1951, when it was turned over to a nonprofit for conversion to a museum.

Among other notable accomplishments, Seward negotiated the 1867 purchase of Alaska from Russia, which became known as "Seward's Folly". Although he spent many years in Albany and Washington, D.C., he called this house his home from the time of his marriage in 1824 until his death.

== Gallery ==
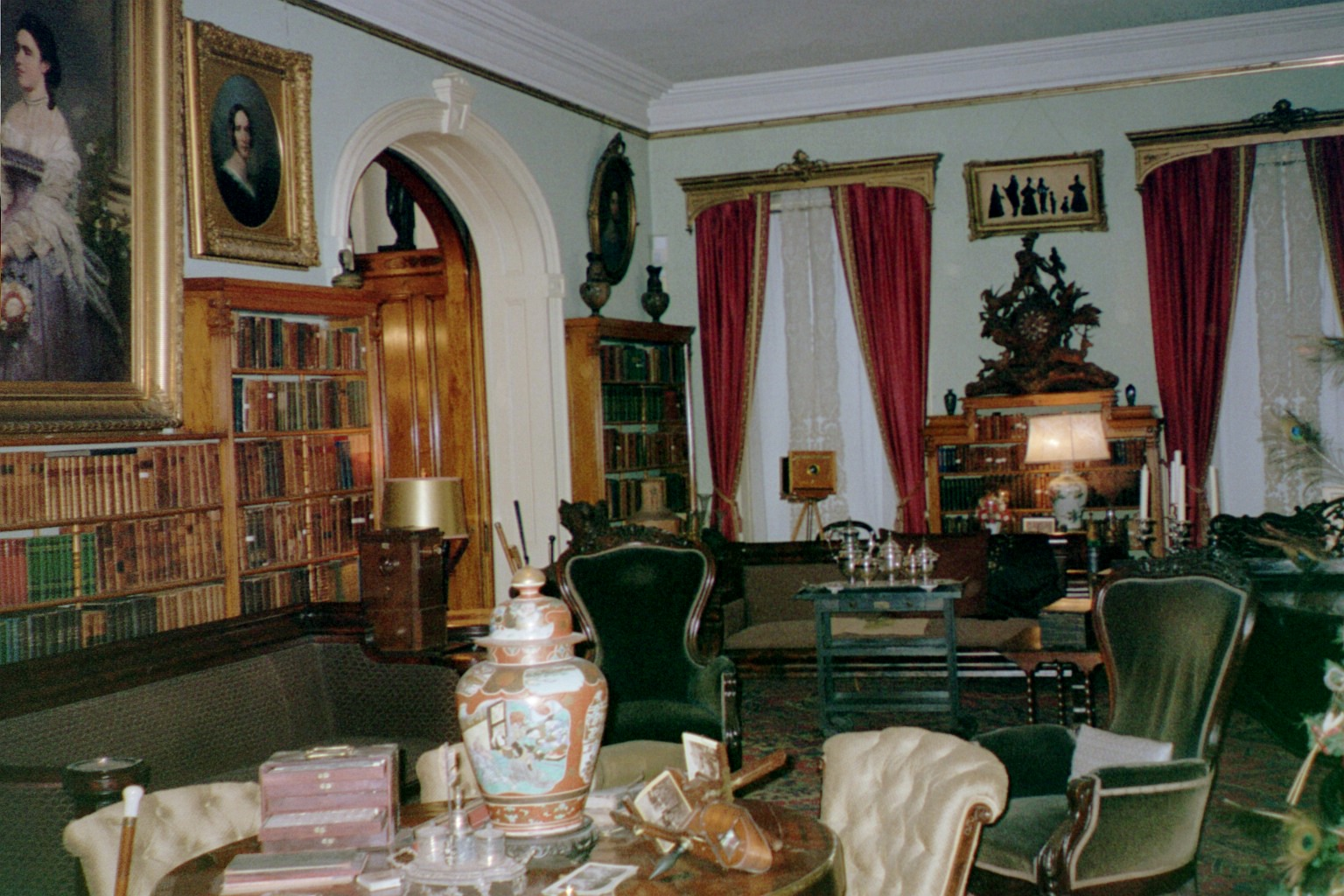
Drawing Room

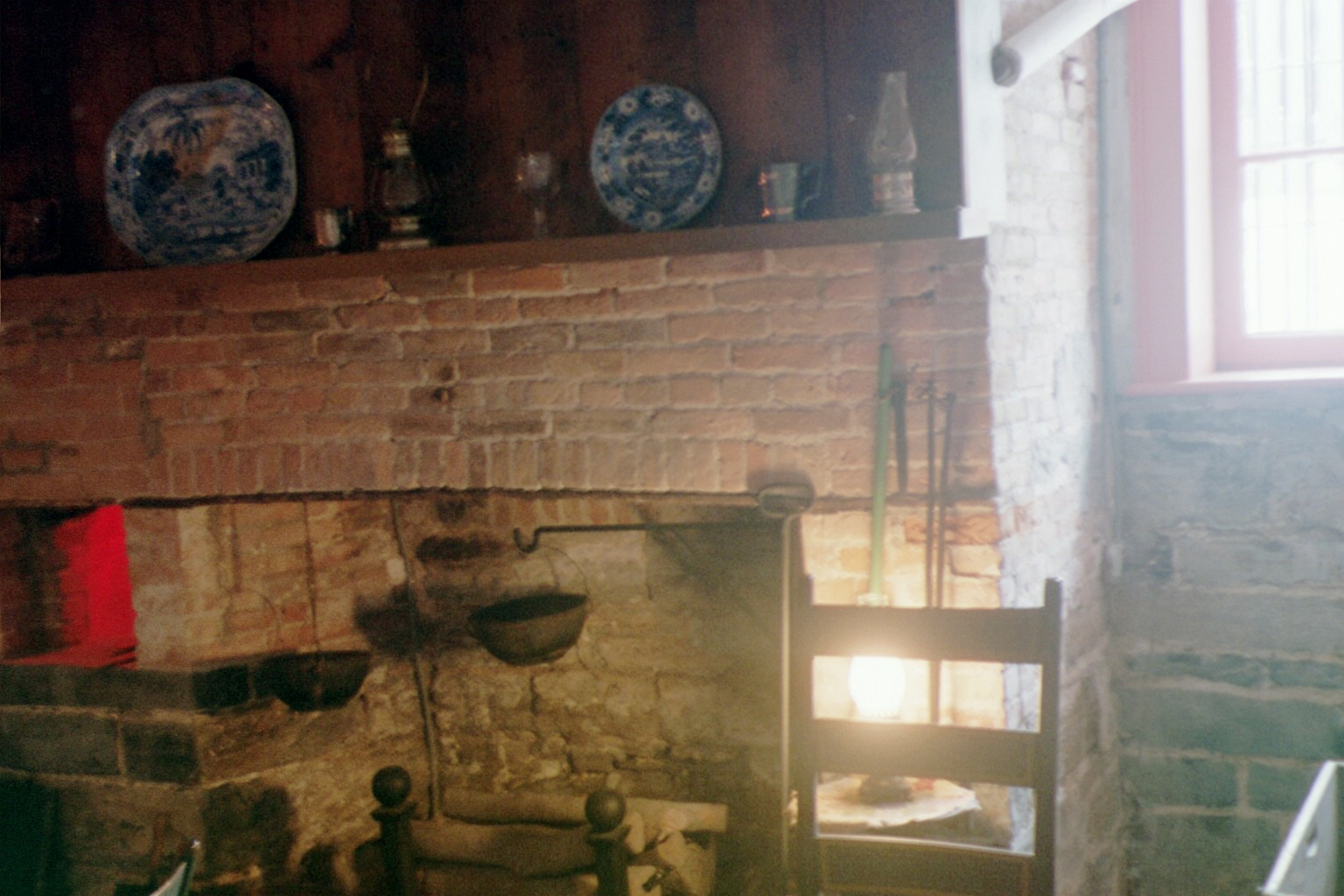
Original basement kitchen, later used as hiding place for runaway slaves on the Underground Railroad

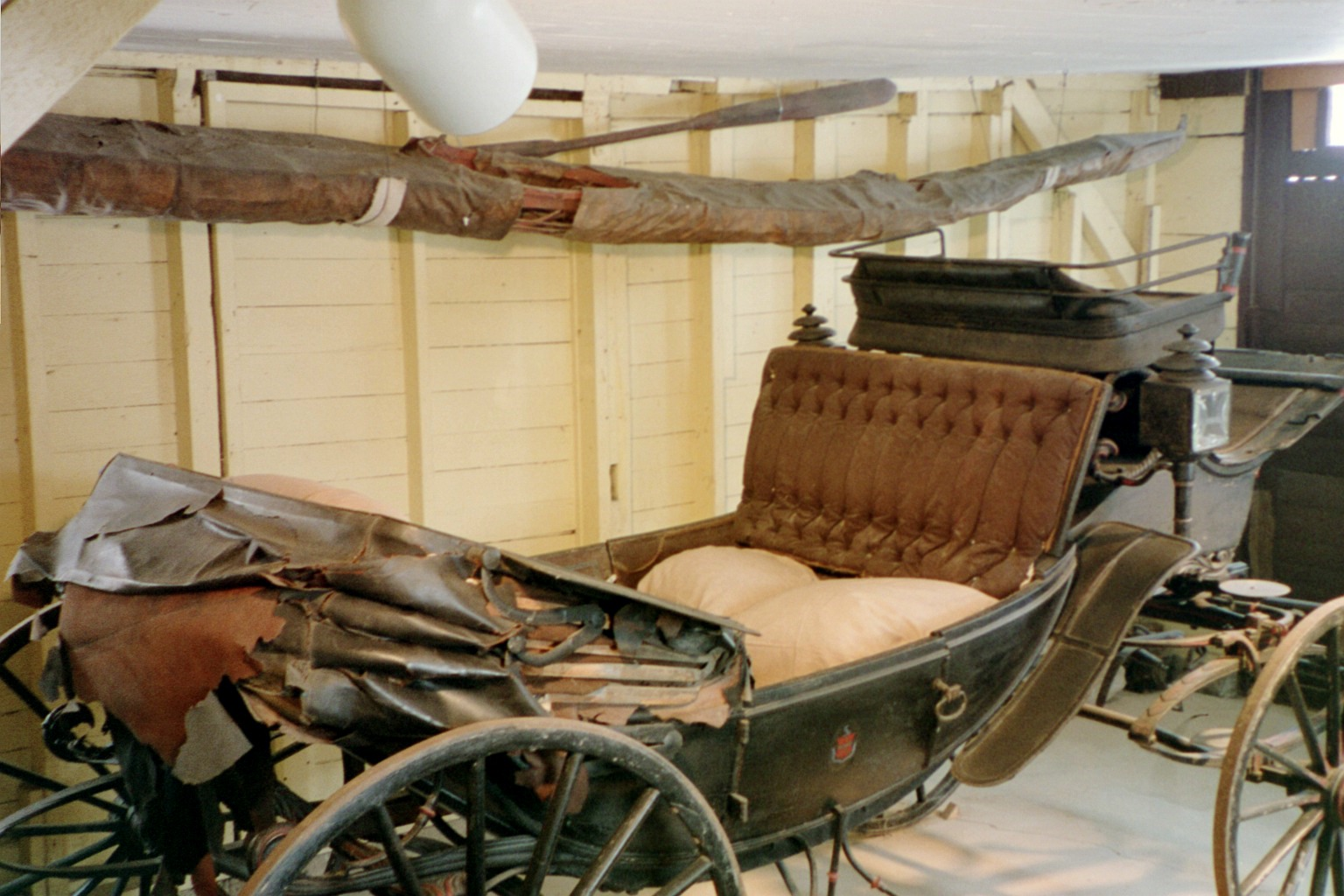
This carriage was involved in an accident that severely injured Seward leaving him bedridden the night Lincoln was shot, when another conspirator attacked Seward with a knife.

== See also ==
- List of National Historic Landmarks in New York
- National Register of Historic Places listings in Cayuga County, New York
