= Victoria MacKenzie-Childs =

American ceramic artist (1948–2026)

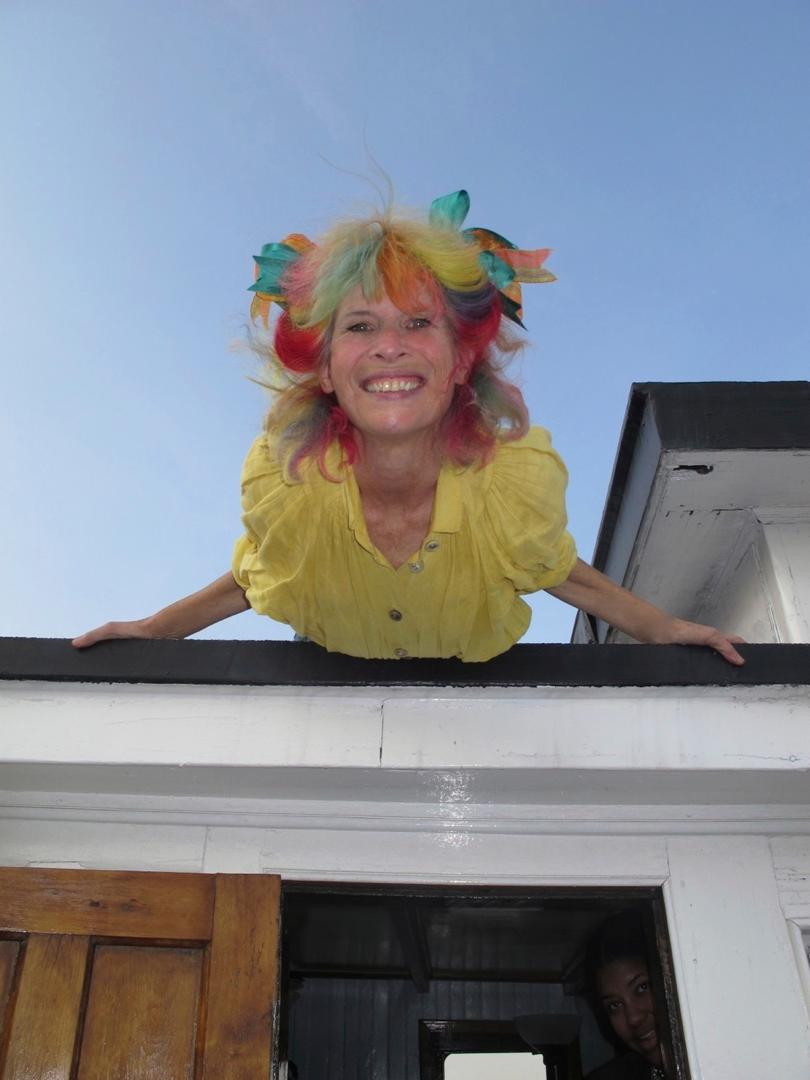
- MacKenzie-Childs aboard Yankee Ferry
- Born: August 26, 1948; San Francisco, California, U.S.
- Died: March 4, 2026 (aged 77)
- Education: New York State College of Ceramics at Alfred University
- Occupation: Ceramic artist
- Notable work: MacKenzie-Childs
- Spouse: Richard MacKenzie-Childs
- Children: 1
- Website: victoriaandrichardemprise.com

Victoria MacKenzie-Childs (August 26, 1948 – March 4, 2026) was an American ceramic artist who, along with her husband Richard, founded the luxury home goods firm MacKenzie-Childs in 1983. A beacon of Madison Avenue in New York City in the 1990s, their "chic boutique" showcased their distinctly whimsical style that the New York Post once described as "Mary Poppins meets Alice in Wonderland." They lost control of the company in 2001 following bankruptcy proceedings.

== Background ==
MacKenzie-Childs was born August 26, 1948, in San Francisco. She moved to Madison, Indiana, in 1960 when her father got a job as a sales manager for Grote Manufacturing. She was active in 4-H and an artist, winning a blue ribbon at the Indiana State Fair for one of her ceramics. In 1966, she graduated from Madison Consolidated High School. That year, the family moved to Indianapolis, Indiana.

MacKenzie-Childs earned a Bachelor of Fine Arts degree from Indiana University in 1970. She married Stephen Nelson Conrad on April 11, 1970, in Indianapolis. She divorced him in 1973 and married Richard in August of 1974. She went on to take graduate courses at Harvard and Radcliffe. She graduated in 1977 from the New York State College of Ceramics at Alfred University. Before considering enrolling at Alfred, she learned pottery pioneer Wayne Higby was headed to Alfred to teach. Determined to work with him, the school became her prime prospect. Higby eventually became her teacher and mentor, and both she and Richard received their Master of Fine Arts with him. In 2017, Victoria and Richard delivered Alfred University's 181st commencement address.

Following graduate school, Victoria and Richard moved to Stoke Gabriel in Devon, England, where they worked for a small pottery store and Richard taught art at South Devon College. They also designed and made clothing for stage and evening wear.

In 1994, the couple received a joint regional Entrepreneur of the Year Award at the Marriott Marquis Hotel in New York. She was the mother of organic textile designer Heather Chaplet.

== The original MacKenzie-Childs ==
Victoria and Richard's fledgling focus was on high-end, hand-crafted majolica dinnerware and glassware, and as they became more established they expanded to include linens, lamps, tassels, trims, and imaginative household furnishings by experimenting with old abandoned furniture they rebuilt, upholstered, and painted. Aside from their flagship Madison Avenue store that opened in 1993, top retailers like Bergdorf Goodman and Neiman Marcus created exclusive MacKenzie-Childs shops within their stores. The brand appeared for sale in more than 150 upscale speciality retailers throughout the United States.

The notable outfit Bunch Auctions once described their lavish style: "From side chairs with backrests of landscape painted fish, to a rattan floor lamp with a thistle fringed shade resting on a quartet of white ceramic rabbits, to an aptly named 'ridiculous bench' with reversible cushions and gilt detail."

== Yankee Ferry ==
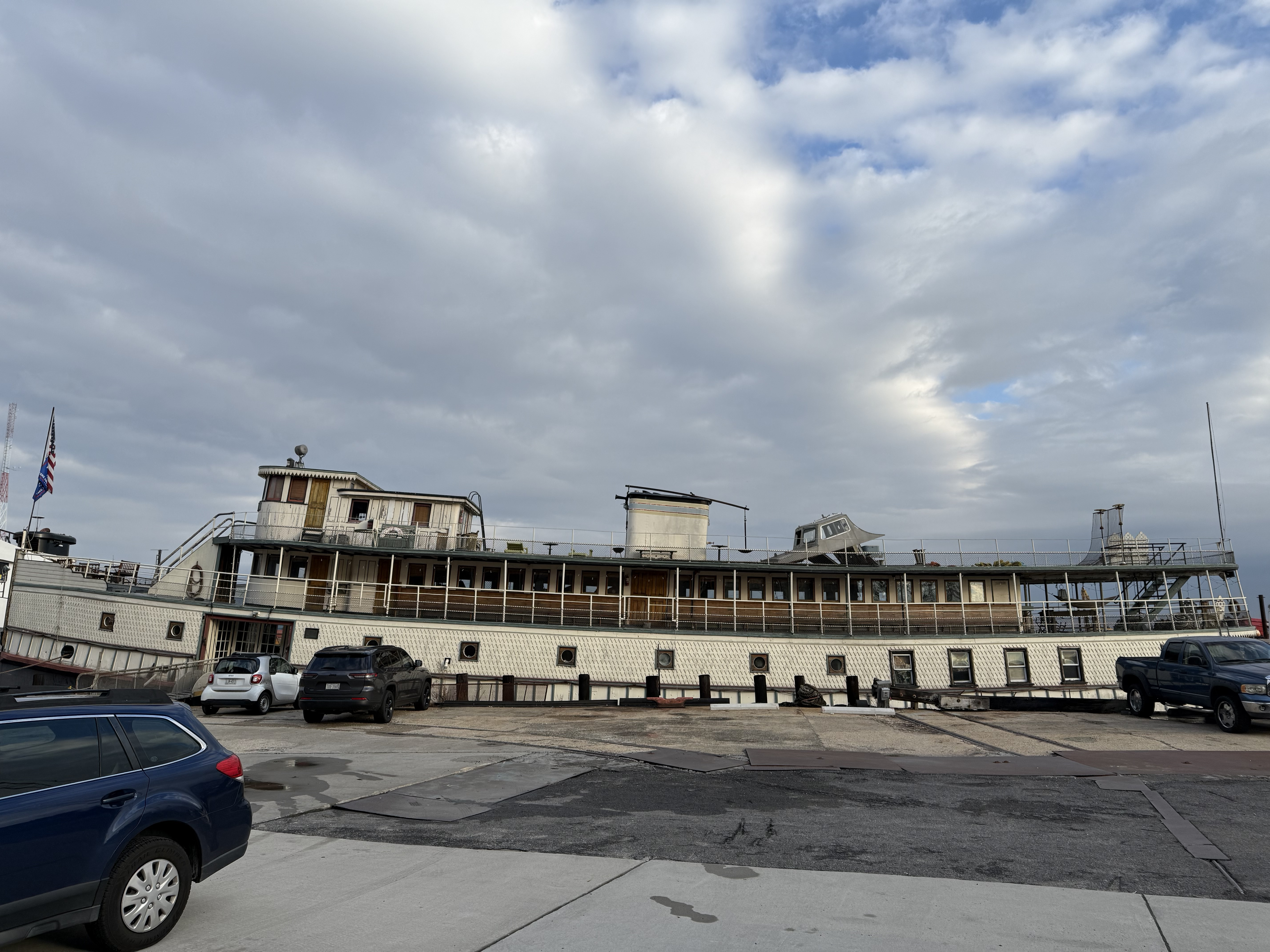
Yankee Ferry in Staten Island in November 2024

In 2003 Victoria and Richard bought the last remaining Ellis Island ferryboat, Yankee Ferry, and turned it into a home and floating studio along with their two dachshunds. First built in Philadelphia in 1907, the 150-foot steel-hulled boat carried immigrants from Ellis Island to the mainland. The United States Navy commissioned it during World War I and World War II to be a patrol boat; at one time it guarded Boston Harbor, and it was placed on the National Register of Historic Places in 1992. As of 2024 the boat is docked in Staten Island.

A year after purchasing the boat, Victoria told The Free Library: "It's so much more exciting and energizing to be sharing our work with the world in this more industrial way now."

== Court filings ==
In 2000, amidst planning a second store that was to open on the iconic Rodeo Drive in Beverly Hills, the MacKenzie-Childs brand was forced to enter Chapter 11 bankruptcy protection following financial difficulties. After they defaulted on a $15.3 million loan, American Girl founder, Pleasant Rowland, purchased their assets from the bank for a fraction of that amount—$6 million. She subsequently used the remaining $10 million debt as leverage to force them into a non-compete agreement. The couple refused to be bound by such a deal and preempted this threat by filing for Chapter 7 bankruptcy to discharge their liabilities. They refused to sign the agreement, which would give up all rights to the MacKenzie-Childs name.

In 2001, after they lost their company, Richard and Victoria launched Victoria and Richard Emprise, under the name of which they continued to create and sell their designs.

In 2006, Rowland sued Victoria and Richard for starting a new business using "Victoria and Richard," as their name had been sold off in the bankruptcy proceedings. The founders countersued Rowland for attaching their name to designs they did not create. In 2008, Rowland sold the company to Lee Feldman and Howard Cohen, partners at the Twin Lakes Capital equity firm based in New York. MacKenzie-Childs products are still signed "MacKenzie Childs."

== YouTube channel ==
In 2020, Victoria MacKenzie-Childs launched a YouTube channel on life on the Yankee Ferry, offering personal accounts on subjects such as the story behind her rainbow-hued hairstyle, the loss of their company, and their drive to continue designing.

== Death ==
MacKenzie-Childs died on March 4, 2026, at the age of 77. She was survived by her husband and their daughter, Heather Chaplet. Her cause of death was not disclosed, but it was reported that she did not seek medical help for health struggles, owing to her belief in Christian Science.
