= Pleasant Rowland =

American businesswoman and founder of the American Girl doll company

Pleasant Thiele Rowland
- Born: Pleasant Williams Thiele; March 8, 1941 (age 85); Chicago, Illinois, U.S.
- Education: Wells College, 1962
- Known for: Founder of American Girl, philanthropy
- Spouse: W. Jerome "Jerry" Frautschi (m. 1977; died 2026)
- Father: Edward Thiele, president of Leo Burnett Worldwide

Pleasant T. Rowland (born Pleasant Williams Thiele; March 8, 1941) is an American educator, reporter, writer, entrepreneur, and philanthropist. Rowland is best known for creating the American Girl brand.

Rowland is known for her philanthropic work in the arts in Madison, Wisconsin and her efforts to redevelop historic properties in Aurora, New York.

== Early life and education ==
Rowland was born in Chicago and grew up in Bannockburn, a suburb north of Chicago. She is the oldest of three sisters and a brother. Her sister, Barbara Whitney Carr, was the former president and CEO of the Chicago Botanic Gardens from 1995 to 2007. Her father was Edward M. Thiele, a Chicago advertising executive who was president of the Leo Burnett ad agency from 1961 to 1971.

After graduating from Wells College in 1962, Rowland began teaching second-grade students at Mattapan Elementary in Massachusetts. From 1962 to 1968, she continued to work as a schoolteacher in several states. She was an on-air reporter and anchor for KGO-TV, the San Francisco ABC affiliate, from 1968 to 1971.

While on assignment, Rowland met a representative of Boston Educational Research, an educational publishing company. She left the news industry to work as director of product development at the publishing company. She was involved in writing and publishing children's textbooks in Boston, Massachusetts from 1971 to 1978. Rowland also published the Children's Magazine Guide.

Rowland created a comprehensive language-arts program called Beginning to Read, Write, and Listen. The program was informally known as the "letterbooks" and designed for kindergarten and first-grade students. "Based on [Beginning to Read, Write, and Listen's] success, Addison-Wesley, another school publisher, approached me about writing a basal reading and language arts program,” Rowland explained. Rowland developed the Addison-Wesley Reading Program until the project was shelved in 1981.

Rowland met her future husband, W. Jerome "Jerry" Frautschi, in Madison in November 1976. Rowland was in town for a press check on the first printing of her language-arts program at Webcrafters, a family-owned printing firm. Jerry's brother, John Frautschi, succeeded their father as president of Webcrafter in 1970. (Webcrafters was later purchased by the CJK Group, Inc., in 2017.) During her business visit to Webcrafters, Frautschi served as Rowland's sales representative. Rowland and Frautschi were married in May 1977.

== Career ==
=== Pleasant Company and American Girl ===
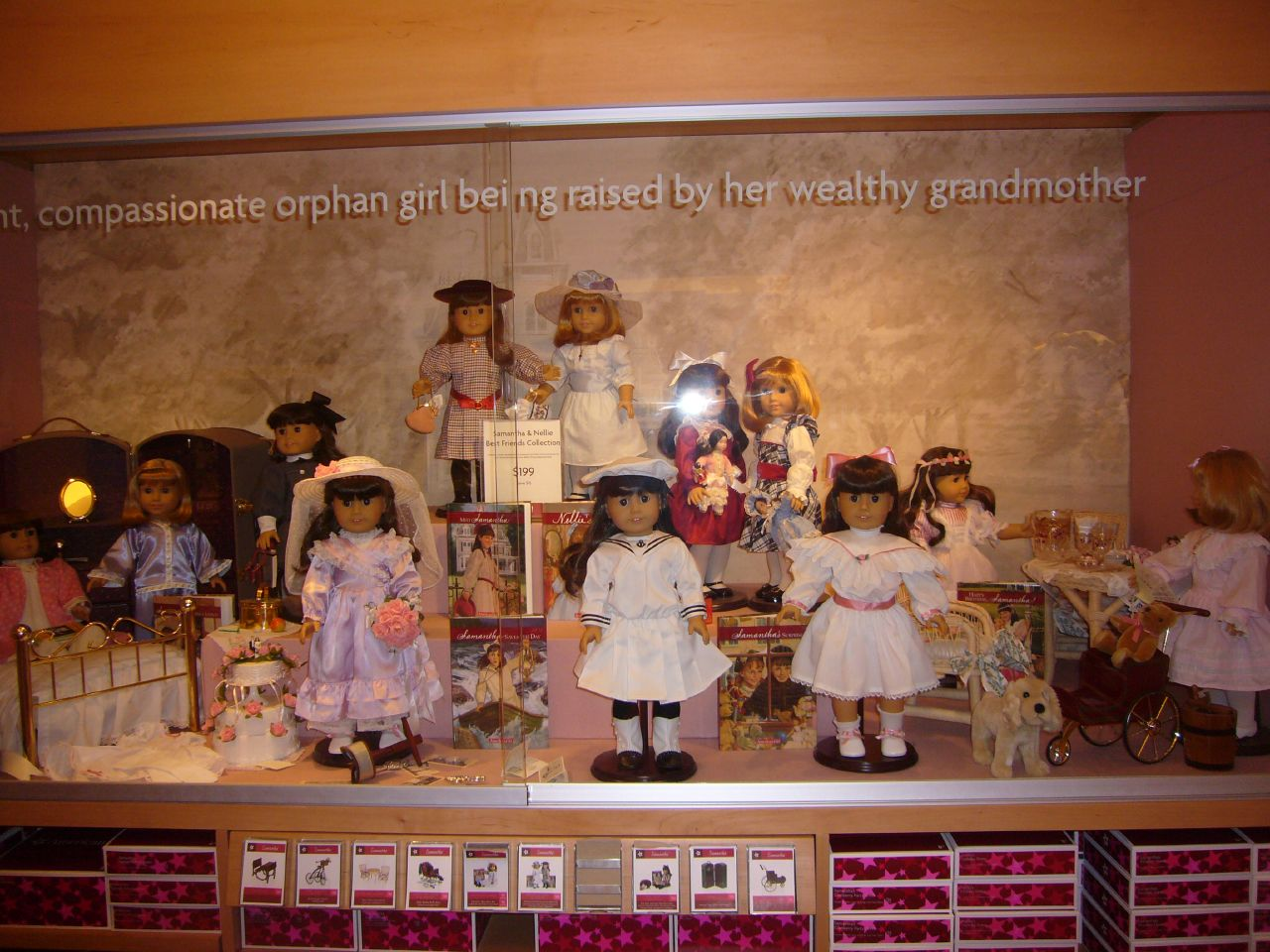
The American Girl doll "Samantha Parkington" on display at the American Girl Place in 2007.

In 1986, Rowland founded Pleasant Company to manufacture American Girl dolls. She had saved $1.2 million from textbook royalties and invested the majority of those savings into the project. The American Girl product line aimed to teach aspects of American history through a six-book series from the perspective of a girl living in that period. The company would go on to produce dolls, books, and historically accurate accessories (now known as the Historical Characters.) Rowland described the American Girl dolls as "chocolate cake with vitamins": incorporating imagination, play, and history.

According to several interviews, Rowland was inspired to create the American Girls Collection during a vacation in Colonial Williamsburg in 1984. “I remember sitting on a bench in the shade, reflecting on what a poor job schools do of teaching history, and how sad it was that more kids couldn't visit this fabulous classroom of living history," Rowland said. "Was there some way I could bring history alive for them, the way Williamsburg had for me?” Rowland would also recall being struck by the project as the vision of financier and philanthropist John D. Rockefeller Jr., who helped finance the 18th-century historical reconstruction.

Rowland worked with Valerie Tripp, a close friend and colleague from Addison-Wesley, to develop characters for the first line of dolls. Each character represented a different period of American history. The first three characters were Kirsten Larson, a Swedish immigrant who settled with her extended family in the 1850s Minnesota Territory; Samantha Parkington from the Progressive Era; and Molly McIntire, a character living during World War II. Initially, the dolls and their accessories were only available via mail-order catalog. The first manufacturing and distribution center was in a warehouse in Madison, Wisconsin, later moving their corporate offices to Middleton, Wisconsin.

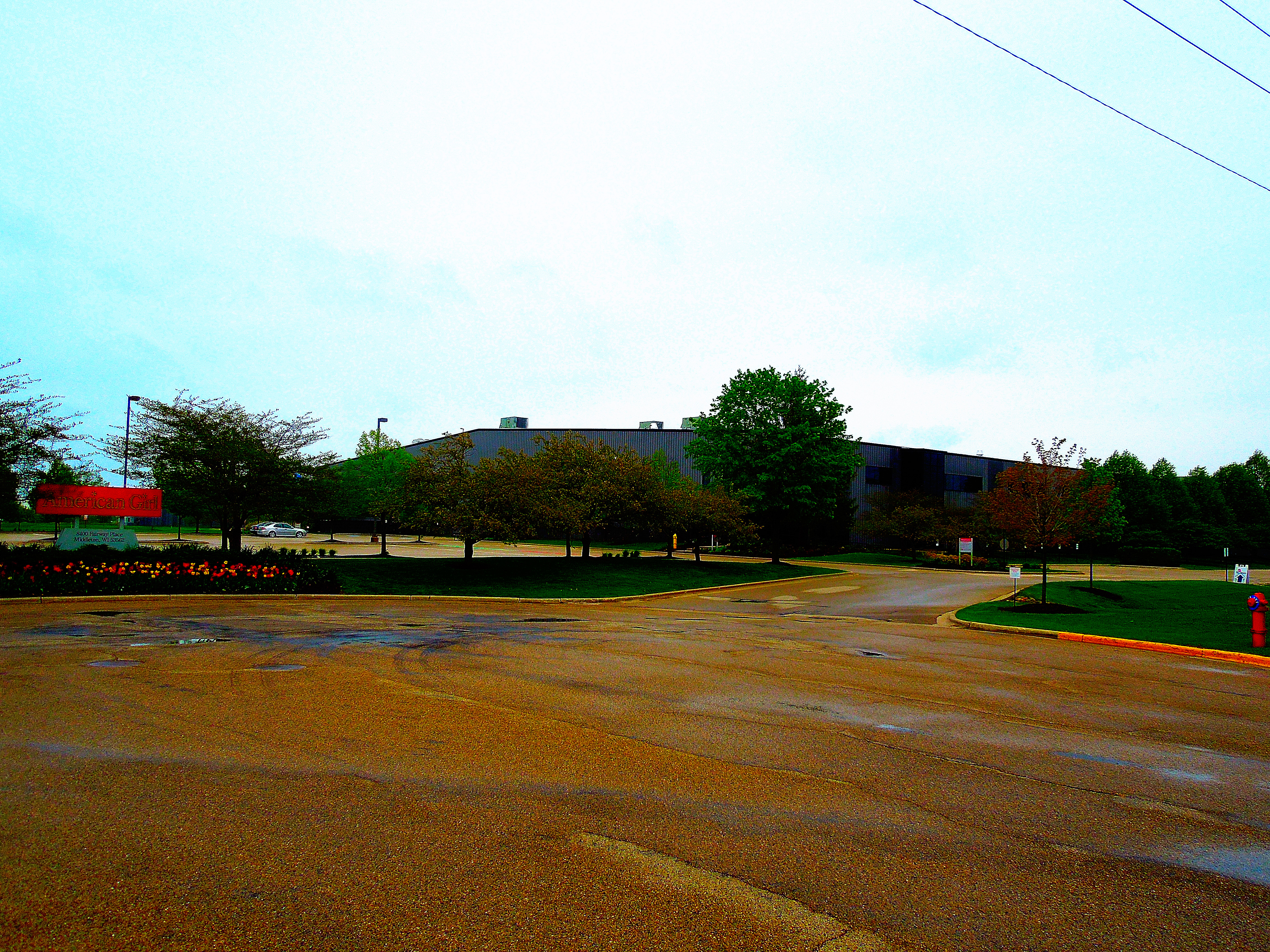
American Girl headquarters in Middleton, Wisconsin, in 2012.

In the first two years of Pleasant Company, sales grew from $1.7 million to $7.6 million. In the third year of operations, Rowland was diagnosed with breast cancer. "I cut the ribbon on the new warehouse in the morning and went into the hospital that afternoon to have surgery," Rowland said. "Throughout chemotherapy and radiation I never missed a day of work, and work is probably what saved me. Pleasant Company was on such a roll. I loved what I was doing, and after all my mind didn't have cancer. I just got through."

Pleasant Company eventually began to produce more dolls, starting in 1991 with Felicity Merriman: a 1770s girl living during the American Revolution in Williamsburg, Virginia. They continued to produce more books, clothing (for dolls and children), dollhouses, children's furniture, and more. Rowland described the American Girl novels as "[celebrating] family, hard work, honesty, courage, reliability and responsibility." The company began producing the American Girl magazine in 1992. In 2002, Rowland described her belief in the importance of the whole package (of dolls, books, and accessories):

I knew there was magic in the American Girl concept, but it was in the whole idea, not just part. I knew the books had to have stories so good that the reader would identify with and fall in love with the character. If she loved the character, she would want the doll. If she had the doll, she would want the clothes and accessories to play out the stories. If she played out the stories, she would want more books. So nothing could disappoint. The product had to be right, down to the tiniest detail.

According to Rowland, Pleasant Company was interested in "multiethnic representation in the product line" but hoped to become established financially before producing non-white dolls for their target customers. In 1993, the first African-American doll (Addy Walker) was introduced into the American Girls Collection after extensive work with a seven-person advisory panel of African-American scholars. “We could have pushed the diversity button sooner,” Rowland said in a 1994 interview with the Los Angeles Times. “If I got hit by a truck tomorrow, I could die knowing that we made toy history. We made a black doll an object of status and desire for white children.”

Addy's story follows her eventual escape from slavery in North Carolina to Philadelphia with her mother during the American Civil War. The development of the Addy doll was deliberate and, at times, contentious. To balance the fine lines between marketability, historical accuracy, and cultural sensitivity, Rowland and the board had extensive discussions about the appearance of the doll and her accompanying story with the author, Connie Porter, and the advisory panel. Melodye Rosales, the illustrator for the first three Addy Walker American Girl books, described her relationship with Pleasant Company and Rowland as confrontational. Rosales claimed that "she was removed from the project because Pleasant Company wanted her to make the characters and their surroundings look more pleasant than they would have in reality." Rowland has described Rosales' dismissal as "a labor issue that cannot be discussed."

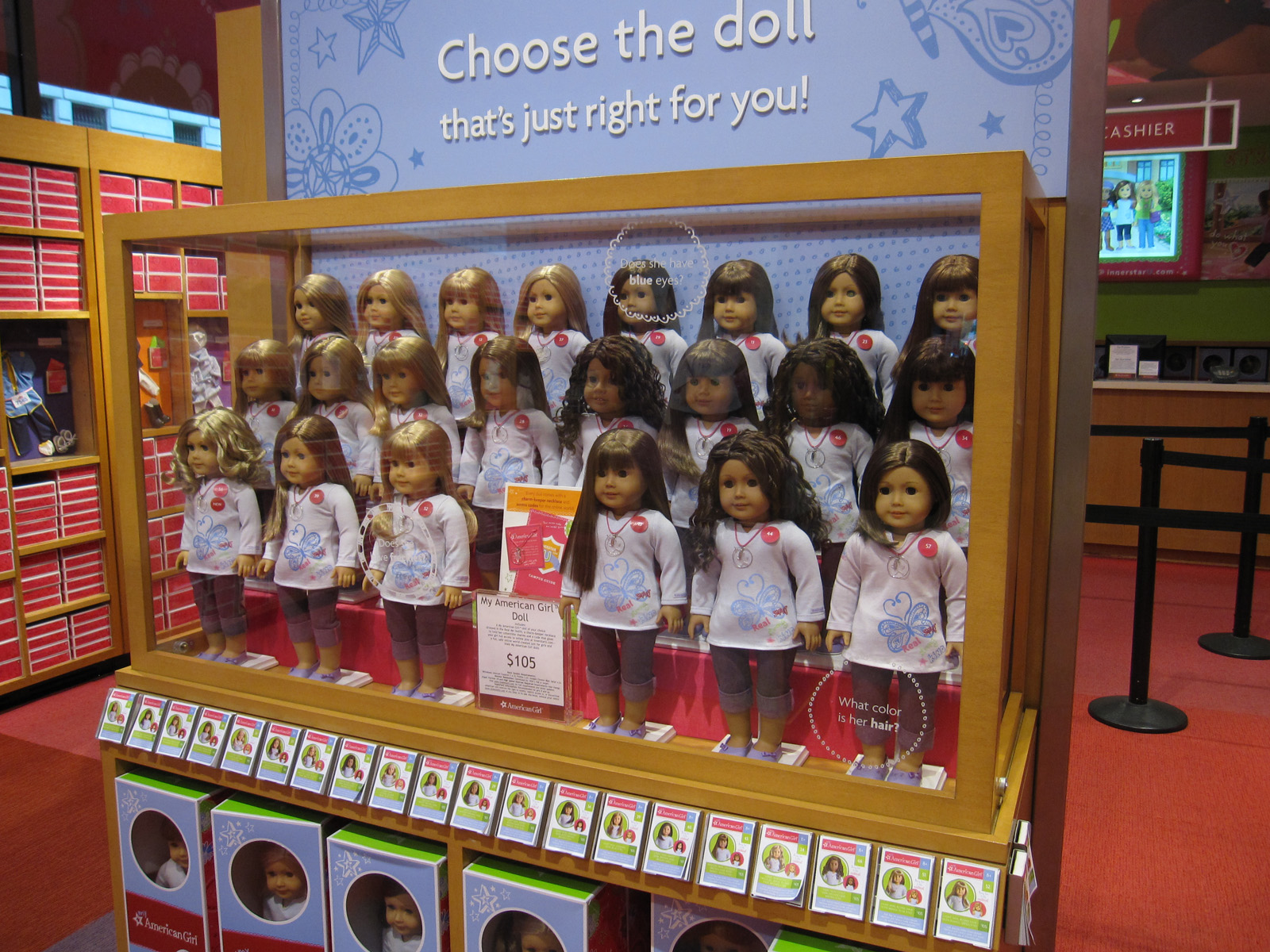
"My American Girl Doll" display at the American Girl Place on Fifth Avenue in New York City, 2012.

The first specialized American Girl retail store opened in Chicago in 1998. Rowland later recalled: "The last important piece of the original business plan came into being with the building of American Girl Place... This would be the American Girl mecca, an extremely special environment with a store, a theater, a museum, and a restaurant."

In the summer of 1998, Rowland sold Pleasant Company (now American Girl) to Mattel Inc. for $700 million (equivalent to $1.38 billion today). As a result of the transaction, Mattel appointed Rowland as vice chairman of Mattel's board. In July 2000, Rowland retired as a Mattel board member and as president of American Girl.

=== Other ventures ===
In 2001, Rowland purchased retailer MacKenzie-Childs, based in Aurora, NY, from Victoria MacKenzie-Childs and Richard MacKenzie-Childs. After Rowland restructured the company's management team in 2006, MacKenzie-Childs became profitable. In 2008, Rowland sold MacKenzie-Childs to the part owners of Twin Lakes Capital Lee Feldman and Howard Cohen.

To support research into early reading instruction, and update and distribute The Superkids Reading Program she developed at Addison-Wesley, Rowland founded the nonprofit Rowland Reading Foundation in 2003. The reading program was purchased by education publisher Zaner-Bloser in 2015 and continues to be used in thousands of classrooms across the U.S.

In September 2010, Rowland received an honorary doctorate from Edgewood College in Madison, Wisconsin. She has also received honorary degrees from the University of Wisconsin-Madison and University of Hartford.

== Philanthropy ==
Rowland and her husband W. Jerome Frautschi are major philanthropists in Madison, Wisconsin. Frautschi and his family have been based in Madison since his grandfather, Swiss immigrant Christian Frautschi, came to Madison in the 1860s.

=== Restoration of Historic Properties in Aurora, New York ===
In 2001, Rowland partnered with her alma mater, Wells College, and founded the Aurora Foundation to manage and renovate various college-owned buildings and businesses in Aurora such as the Aurora Inn and E.B. Morgan House. The Aurora Inn, built in 1833 by the co-founder of The New York Times, is part of the Aurora Village–Wells College Historic District and was deeded to Wells College in 1943.

There was mixed reception of Rowland's restoration and revitalization project. Wells' vice president of communications noted an increase in enrollment and recruitment of new faculty to Wells College, in addition to major structural improvements. Other residents of Aurora and alumnae of Wells College objected to the historical accuracy of the improvements and expressed concerns that these changes were not reflective of the community or intended for the people living in the town, but rather to encourage a wealthier clientele for tourism. Critics started a non-profit organization called the Aurora Coalition to "support historic integrity and economic autonomy."

In opposition to these changes, the Aurora Coalition launched a lawsuit to stop the renovation of the Aurora Inn and the demolition of a neighboring grocery. The National Trust for Historic Preservation and the Preservation League of New York state joined the suit because of concerns that local government was not paying enough attention to state laws requiring thorough review of projects in historic districts. The New York State Supreme Court ruled against the Aurora Coalition and allowed the renovation of the Aurora Inn to proceed. The Appeals Court allowed the lower court's decision to stand.

The Aurora Foundation redeveloped the inn for lodging, dining, and events and completed renovations in 2003. During her speech at the ribbon-cutting ceremony, Rowland remarked on how Wells College and the surrounding village were "reminders of the values and traditions of another, more tender time." Rowland donated $40 million to Wells College to revitalize Aurora’s downtown district and reverse declining enrollment. In press accounts, Rowland expressed her vision of enhancing the historic character and attractiveness of the community and improving the local economy.

The Aurora Coalition commented on Rowland's changes to the town on their website:

Rowland promised to collaborate with the community to promote economic growth. Six years later, her promise is unfilled and Rowland remains inaccessible and unresponsive. Locally owned [businesses] were evicted. Few new jobs went to locals. Most LLC employment is part-time or seasonal. ...Our local government failed to require Environmental Impact Studies or Section 106 Reviews for her projects, and many negative results arose from her segmented development: destruction of historic architecture, devastation of archeological sites, loss of public recreational space, elimination of local businesses, loss of parking space, development of dangerous traffic patterns, obliteration of local gathering places, corrosion of community identity, etc.

In January 2006, local supporters threw a thank you party for Rowland in recognition and appreciation of her contributions to the town of Aurora. "In my heart I knew you were all there," Rowland said. “I just didn't know you were so many.”

As of 2018, Rowland and the Aurora Foundation have restored 15 buildings in the village of Aurora.

=== Other gifts and contributions ===
Frautschi and Rowland started the Overture Foundation in 1996. With the sale of Pleasant Company to Mattel, Frautschi's retirement from Webcrafters, and the involvement of city planner George Austin, Frautschi and Rowland set out to help develop an arts district in Madison.

Rowland and Frautschi gave multiple gifts totaling $205 million to cover the building costs of the Overture Center for the Arts, a performing arts center and art gallery, in 2004. (Frautschi is said to have financed the project with personal funds following the sale of his stock in American Girl.) As a privately funded project, these gifts enabled the Overture Center to be built with high-quality materials like travertine floors, custom-dyed carpeting, and historically accurate light fixtures. "The arts are for everybody," Rowland said. "It's one way of bridging all the gaps, and all the voids, and all the tensions in a community, and I think it's important that we make sure that it's available and accessible to everyone in this community."

Rowland supported the Chicago Botanic Gardens with a $5 million gift to establish Evening Island in 1999, the second largest of the Botanic Garden islands. She dedicated the gift and the project to her father, Edward Thiele. At the time, this donation was the largest private gift the Chicago Botanic Gardens had received.

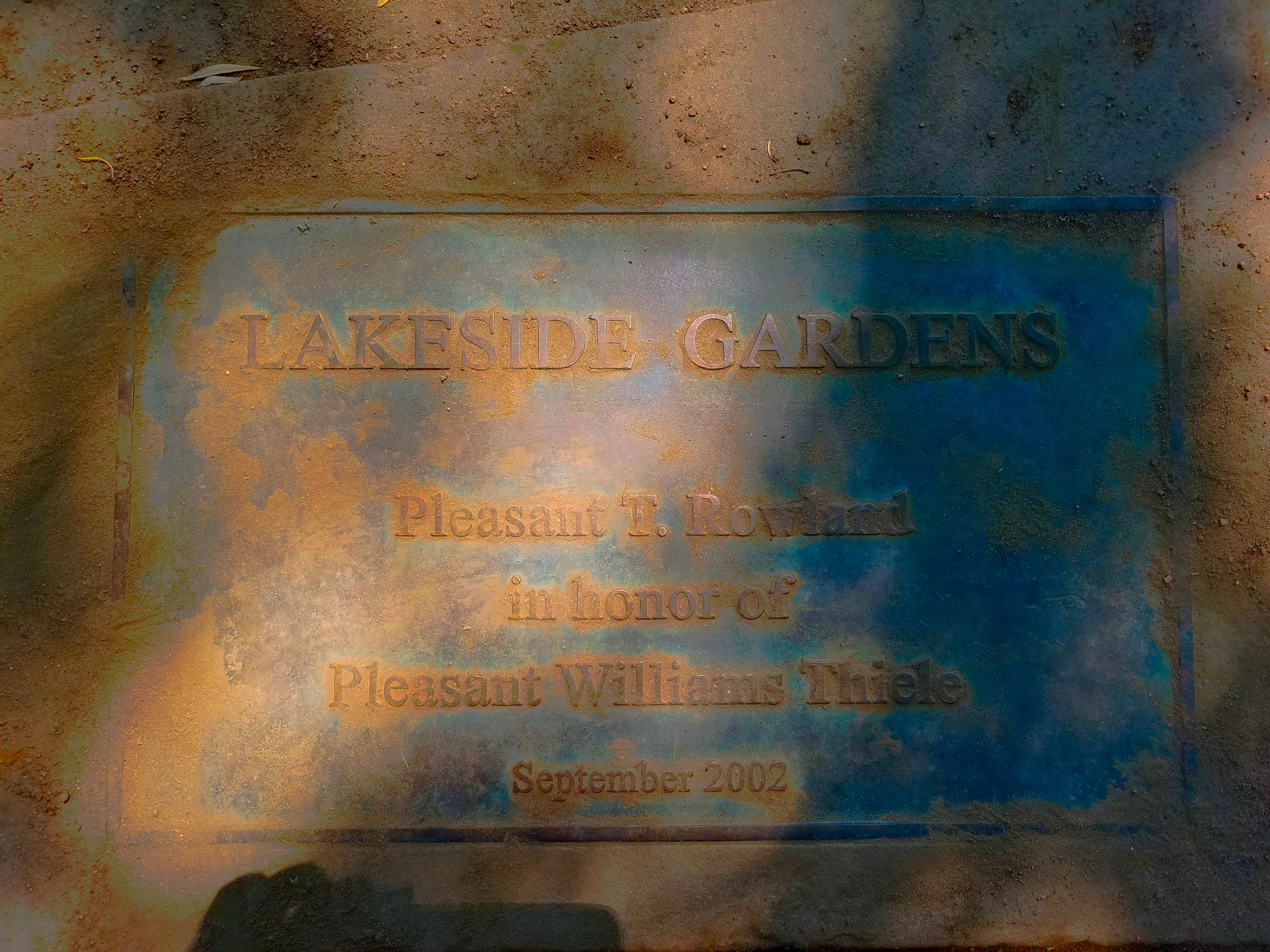
Path marker at Chicago Botanic Garden designating Rowland's contribution.

In 2019, Rowland pledged $20 million to build the Madison Youth Arts Center (MYArts) Opened in 2021, the MYArts building is intended to provide space for performing and visual youth arts groups. In a statement to Madison365, Rowland shared: “[I hope] that Madison Youth Arts Center will give all children in our community the opportunity to engage in creative expression in a place that affirms their value, honors their voices, and reflects their dreams.”

In 2021, Rowland donated $10 million toward the construction of a new transplant clinic at UW Hospital. Rowland received a kidney transplant at the hospital in 2012. “I was blessed to live so close to a world-renowned transplant center," she said. “This is my gift to others who face the same challenges I did and to the world class transplant team at University Hospital."

Rowland donated $1 million for Madison's Black Business Hub in 2021. In a press statement, Rowland wrote: “The disparity in access to entrepreneurial opportunity in Dane County is extreme, and unfortunately has been exacerbated by the pandemic,” Rowland wrote in a press statement. “I am inspired by the Urban League’s vision and pleased that our investment can help bring that vision to life.”

== Awards and honors ==
- Golden Plate Award of the American Academy of Achievement, 1999
- The Jane Bradley Pettit Award for Distinction in Philanthropy, 2009
- Wisconsin Business Hall of Fame, 2010
- Wisconsin Governor's Award
- Association of Educational Publishers’ Hall of Fame
- 100 Women Wall of Honor, University of Wisconsin-Madison School of Human Ecology
