= Heather Chaplet =

Textile designer

Heather Chaplet is a textile designer based in Burkina Faso who produces handmade, organic cotton that helps limit the environmental and ethical damage of the fashion industry. She is the daughter of MacKenzie-Childs co-founder Victoria MacKenzie-Childs.

== Background ==
Chaplet graduated with a degree in theater from Brown University, initially working in set and costume design before pursuing a career in textile designs.

== Career ==
In 2009 she founded Xoomba with her musician husband Nils. Based in one of the poorest countries in Africa, Burkina Faso, Chaplet was initially drawn to the area because of her prior training in African dance. In 2011 the company's first production of 100% fair-trade cotton debuted, and clothing collections for men, women and children followed suit, including a baby line constructed from kapok.

In 2023, Xoomba received a grant from the European Union, administered by the Burkinabè Foundation for Culture and Tourism, along with the SELCO Foundation, to provide Chaplet's team with solar loom makers they use for major textile projects in India.
