= Aurora Steam Grist Mill =

- U.S. National Register of Historic Places
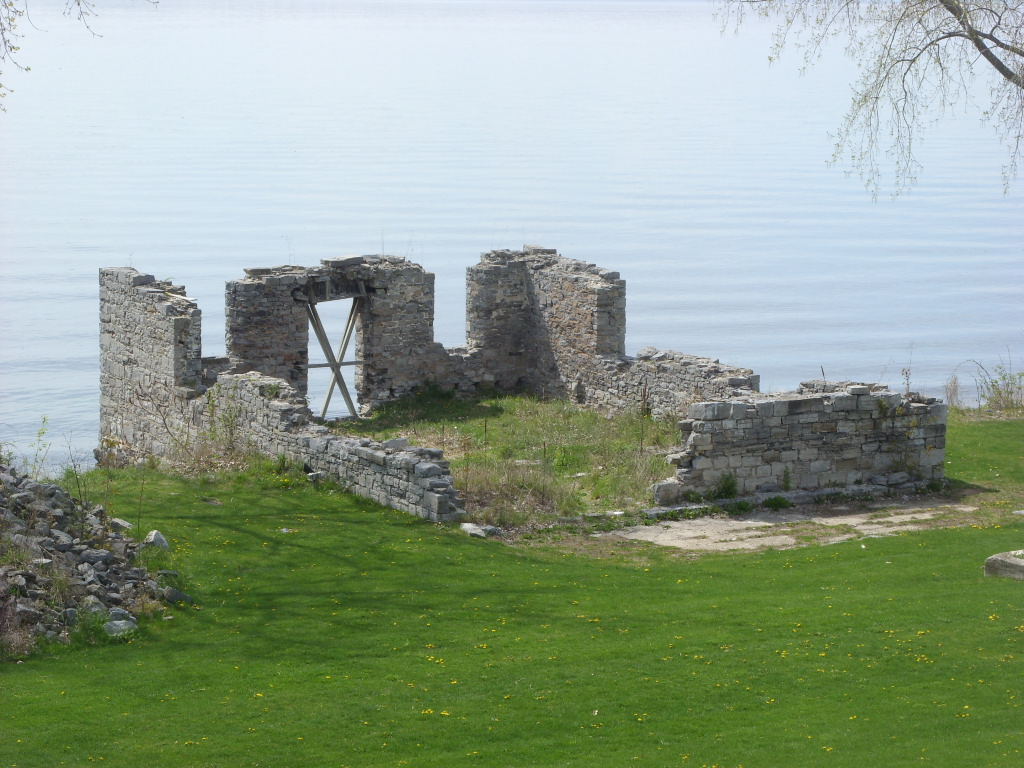
- Aurora Steam Grist Mill, May 09

- Location within New York Location within the United States
- Location: Main St., Aurora, New York
- Coordinates: 42°45′15″N 76°42′15″W
- Area: 2 acres (0.81 ha)
- Built: 1817
- Architect: Curtis, Junia
- NRHP reference No.: 76001207
- Added to NRHP: July 30, 1976

Aurora Steam Grist Mill was a historic grist mill located in Aurora, Cayuga County, New York. It was a monolithic, 3 1/2-story rectangular stone structure built on the shore of Lake Cayuga. It was one of the first mills built west of the Hudson River to be powered by steam. In 1974, the building's roof collapsed due to neglect and plans were to restore it for use as a community center. It was largely intact until 1992, when Wells College began to demolish it in order to build a dock behind the Aurora Inn.

It was listed on the National Register of Historic Places in 1976.
