= Aurora Inn =

- U.S. Historic district – Contributing property
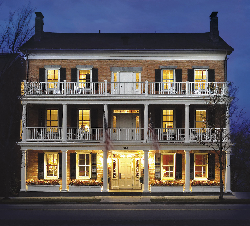
- Aurora Inn at Night

- Location within New York Location within the United States
- Location: Aurora, New York
- Coordinates: 42°45′1″N 76°42′0″W
- Built: 1793
- Architect: Davis, A.J. & Downing, A.J.; Et al.
- Architectural style: Mid 19th Century Revival, Early Republic, Late Victorian
- Part of: Aurora Village-Wells College Historic District (ID80002595)
- Designated CP: November 19, 1980

The Aurora Inn is a historic building in Aurora, Cayuga County, New York. It was built in 1833 for Edwin B. Morgan, a local businessman involved in trade and shipping on Cayuga Lake. It is a contributing property in the Aurora Village-Wells College Historic District which in 1980 was listed on the National Register of Historic Places.

== History of the Aurora Inn ==
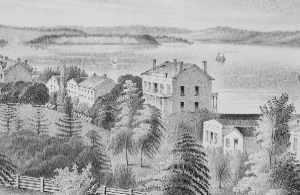
Old Aurora Inn

Originally named Aurora House, the Aurora Inn was built for Morgan, who operated the Morgan Store with his brothers. Aurora served as a port for shipping goods up Cayuga Lake and through the Erie Canal to New York City and other major markets. Morgan was an early investor in The New York Times and American Express and served as a director on Wells Fargo & Company. Morgan's former home, the E. B. Morgan House, a lakefront mansion designed by New York City architect Joseph C. Wells, is also in the historic district.

In the early 1840s, Willem D. Eagles purchased the Aurora Inn. Oil portraits of William Eagles, his wife, Nancy, John Eagles, and his wife were painted in the 19th century by New York artist Charles Loring Elliott and still hang in the inn.

During the 19th century, the Aurora Inn was an overnight destination for travelers who visited Aurora via stagecoach, canal boat and rail. Soon after the Aurora Inn's opening, an article in the local newspaper noted the Inn's "regularity, neatness and order exhibited everywhere — as well as the thousand little attentions which are paid to the comfort and convenience of travelers". The writer also commented on the Aurora Inn's "uninterrupted view of the water scenery of the most enchanting kind" and its "elegance scarcely surpassed by the most extensive houses of our large towns."

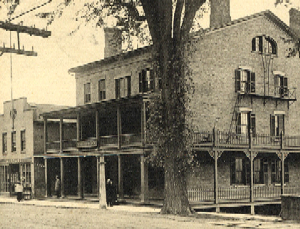
The Aurora Inn when renamed the "Wayside Inn"

When a fire destroyed the main building at Wells College in 1888, many students temporarily relocated to the Aurora Inn which they renamed the Wayside Inn.

On February 27, 1919, a fire destroyed much of Aurora's business district. When the inn caught fire, Wells College President Kerr Duncan McMillan climbed onto the roof and doused the fire with buckets of water handed to him by the village brigade. The charred beams are still present under the current roof.

In 1943, the Aurora Inn was deeded to Wells College. In the 1960s, the Inn served as a residence hall due to increasing enrollment. A drain on the college's resources, the building was repeatedly closed between the 1970s and 2000s, most recently in October 2000.

== Renovation ==
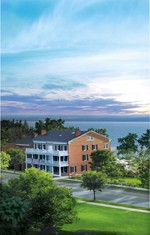
The Aurora Inn Today

The Aurora Foundation, a partnership between Wells College and the Pleasant Rowland Foundation, renovated the Aurora Inn in 2001 to redevelop it for lodging, dining, and events. Finished in 2003, the Aurora Inn has 10 guest rooms, a restaurant with outdoor dining, and a banquet room. Original architectural details were reused or reproduced in many places, but interior remodels were made to meet current code requirements and modern preferences. Historic photographs and etchings were consulted when making exterior changes. A stone terrace, lawns, and gardens were developed between the inn and Cayuga Lake.

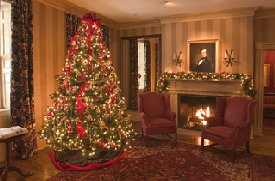
Aurora Inn decorated for the holidays

== See also ==
- List of threatened historic sites in the United States
- National Heritage Area
- Contributing property
- Cultural landscape
- Historic preservation

== Additional Reading ==
Edmunds, Shelia (2000). Aurora: Time Well Spent.
