= Rowland Reading Foundation =

American non-profit organization

Rowland Reading Foundation is a non-profit organization based in Middleton, Wisconsin. Founded by Pleasant Rowland in 2004, it promotes the Rowland Reading Program, including Superkids Reading Program and Happily Ever After, a reading readiness program.

On April 18, 2010, the Foundation launched a media campaign to encourage Wisconsin public schools to adopt the Superkids Reading Program.

In 2015, the Foundation announced that its Superkids Reading Program had been purchased by educational publisher Zaner-Bloser.
