= E. B. Morgan House =

Historic house in New York, United States

- U.S. Historic district – Contributing property
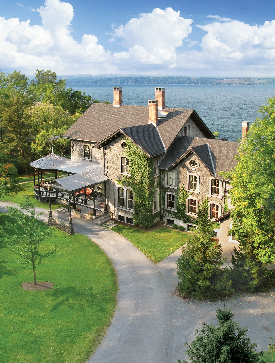
- Location: Aurora, New York
- Built: 1793
- Part of: Aurora Village–Wells College Historic District (ID80002595)
- Added to NRHP: November 19, 1980

The E. B. Morgan House at 431 Main Street, Aurora, New York, was designed in the Italianate style by New York architect Joseph C. Wells for Edwin Barber Morgan, a wealthy entrepreneur and U.S. Congressman. Built between 1857 and 1858, the mansion expressed the new wealth of businessmen in Central New York. Their innovative companies had operations extending to California and the South. The mansion is a contributing property within the Aurora Village–Wells College Historic District, listed in 1980 on the National Register of Historic Places.

== History of E. B. Morgan and his house ==
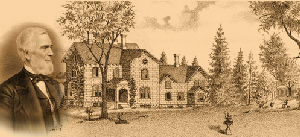
Edwin B. Morgan and E. B. Morgan House 1800s

Morgan had the house constructed beginning in 1857 at a cost of $50,000 (a staggering sum for the 19th century). He commissioned it from New York City architect Joseph C. Wells for his wife, Charlotte Wood Morgan, and their children. (Wells also designed the Presbyterian Church in Aurora.)

Morgan was born in Aurora in 1806, and maintained a home there his entire life. From a young age, Morgan showed considerable business savvy. As a child he worked alongside his father at the family store. Once an adult, E. B. Morgan made money as an entrepreneur in the trade industry on Cayuga Lake. With the capital he earned, he built the Aurora Inn in 1833. It served people involved with the busy shipping on the lake.

Morgan became lifelong friends and business partner with Henry Wells. E. B. Morgan became an early investor in several of Wells' business ventures, including his American Express Company and the Wells Fargo Company. Morgan was also an investor in many local enterprises, and a founding investor in The New York Times.

The prominent Ithaca resident Ezra Cornell was another of E. B. Morgan's business partners. In the 1870s they invested in the Cayuga Lake Railroad Company. The train ran along Cayuga Lake behind both the Inn and E. B. Morgan's private home. Morgan was thrilled with the train and saw its location as allowing him to monitor his investment. He was said to stand with a watch in hand to check the train's punctuality as it passed through his yard.

Following Morgan's death, his daughter and her husband Nicholas Zabriskie took over the E. B. Morgan House. The mansion continued as a Morgan-Zabriskie family home until it was donated to Wells College in 1961. Wells College used the home as dormitories for students' studying French; only French was allowed to be spoken there. While being used as a French-immersion dormitory, the E. B. Morgan House was called "French House", a name which many locals continue to use today.

== Architecture ==
In 2005 the Aurora Foundation and the Pleasant Rowland Foundation completed a multimillion-dollar renovation of the house. The E. B. Morgan renovation team included Pleasant Rowland, Katie Waller (Director of Aurora Foundation) and Steve McGlynn (Project Manager), Holmes King Kallquist Architects of Syracuse, McGlynn Interiors of Skaneateles, and Northeast Construction Services of Syracuse. It is operated as an inn, with options to rent single rooms or the entire mansion for special events. The Foundation focused on maintaining the architectural history of the house, while enhancing it as a lakefront retreat.

Architectural details were preserved while contemporary heating and cooling systems were installed. In addition, it was upgraded with contemporary plumbing. Gas fireplaces were installed in four of the guest rooms.

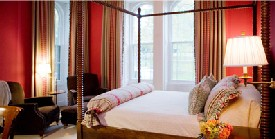
Guest Room at the E. B. Morgan House

Now operated as a bed and breakfast, the house features seven guest rooms, living areas, and a shaded porch that overlooks Cayuga Lake. The house features views of either Cayuga Lake or the village. It is fitted with modern technology.

The Morgan House is available for individual room rental, or the whole house can be rented. The house can accommodate up to 14 for a seated dinner (served on regional specialty Mackenzie-Childs china) or 48 for a cocktail reception.

== Sources ==
- Edmunds, Shelia (2000). Aurora: Time Well Spent. OCLC 209632562.
