= Aurora, Cayuga County, New York =

Aurora, New York
- Village
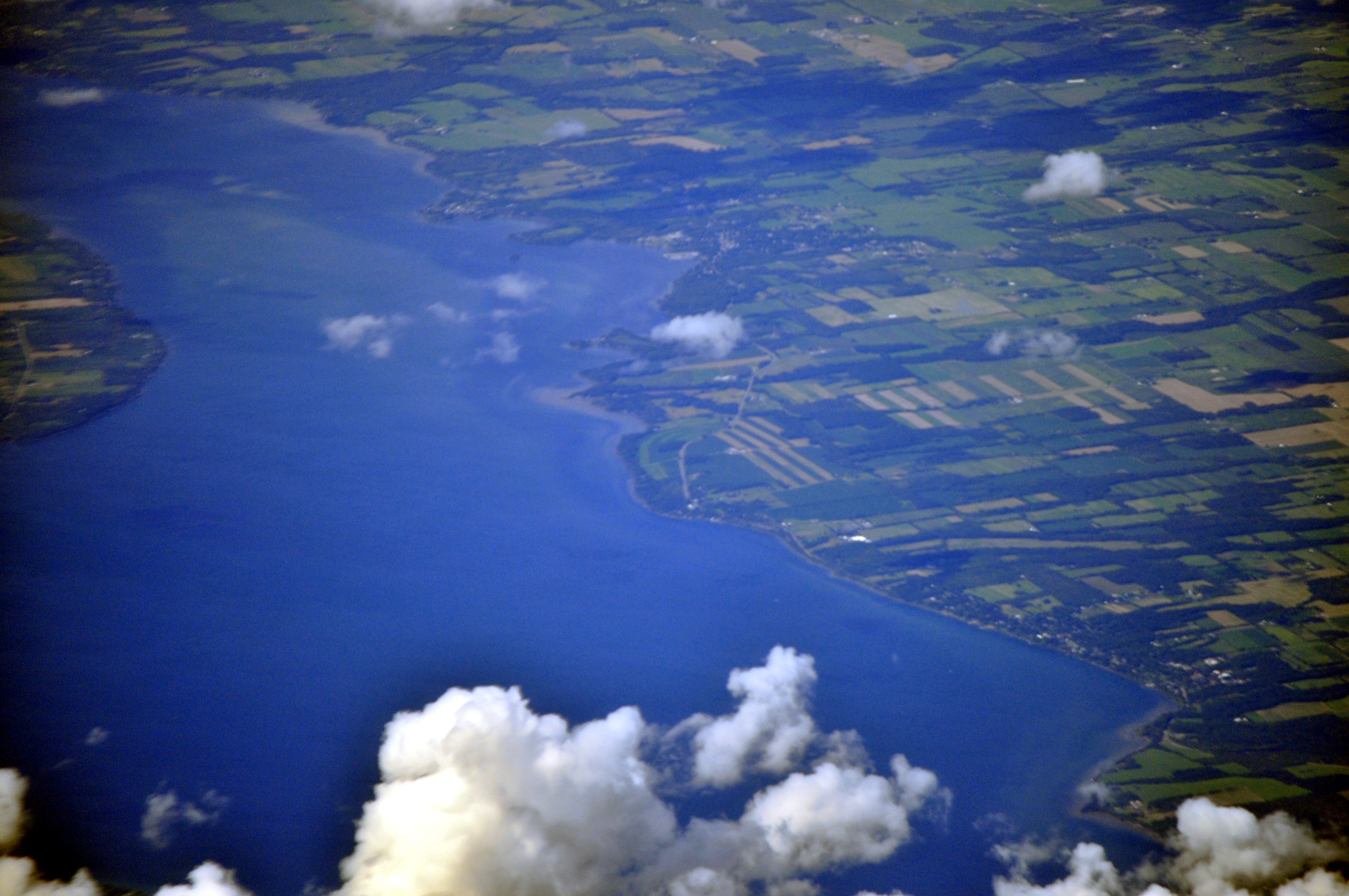
- Aerial view of Aurora from south by southwest, 2013. The village is along the straight stretch of the Cayuga Lake shore just above lower right of photo.

- Location of Aurora within the state of New York Aurora (the United States) Aurora (North America)
- Coordinates: 42°44′48″N 76°41′58″W
- Country: United States
- State: New York
- County: Cayuga County
- Town: Ledyard
- Established: 1795
- Incorporated (village): 1837

Area
  - Total: 0.92 sq mi (2.38 km^{2})
  - Land: 0.92 sq mi (2.38 km^{2})
  - Water: 0 sq mi (0.00 km^{2})
- Elevation: 411 ft (125 m)

Population (2020)
  - Total: 607
  - Density: 660/sq mi (255/km^{2})
- Time zone: UTC-5 (Eastern (EST))
  - Summer (DST): UTC-4 (EDT)
- ZIP code: 13026
- FIPS code: 36-03188
- Website: auroranewyork.us

Aurora, or Aurora-on-Cayuga, is a village and former college town in the town of Ledyard, Cayuga County, New York, United States, on the shore of Cayuga Lake. The village had a population of 724 at the 2010 census.

Wells College, an institution of higher education for women founded by Henry Wells in 1868, was located in Aurora. It became coeducational in 2005 and closed in 2024.

In 1980, its Aurora Village-Wells College Historic District, with more than 50 contributing properties, was listed on the National Register of Historic Places. From 2001 to 2007, controversial redevelopment of historic properties in the village by American Girl doll-creator Pleasant Rowland and the Aurora Foundation earned compliments, as well as provoking citizen concern, a lawsuit joined by state and national preservation organizations, and national media attention.

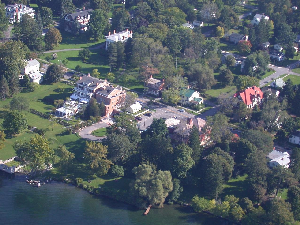
Aerial view of Aurora

== History ==
Indigenous peoples occupied the lakeshore and riverways in present-day New York for thousands of years. Prior to European-American settlement, a major Cayuga village, Chonodote, stood near the present-day site of Aurora village. It had permanent dwellings and the people cultivated fields for their staple crops of varieties of corn, beans and squash. Chonodote was destroyed by the Sullivan Expedition in 1779 during the Revolutionary War, when the Cayuga were allies of the British army, in retaliation for raids by Joseph Brant and his Mohawk and Loyalist forces mostly in the eastern Mohawk Valley. Most of the Cayuga went with other Haudenosaunee nations to Canada, where their descendants are enrolled in the Six Nations Reserve. Some members of the Cayuga tribe returned to the area after the war, but the tribe had been forced to cede its land to New York. They were left landless and shared space with the Seneca on their reservation that once included the north end of Cayuga Lake.

Part of the village was within the Central New York Military Tract. The United States reserved this portion to pay off veterans with deeds to land after the Revolutionary War. The tract was part of the five million acres (20,000 km^{2}) of lands which the Haudenosaunee were forced to cede in the 1794 Treaty of Canandaigua. Many veterans from New England settled in the Finger Lakes area, as did some migrants from the Mohawk and Hudson valleys.

During the 19th century, Aurora developed as a minor center for manufacturing. A stopping point for canal traffic after the Cayuga–Seneca Canal opened, the village was incorporated in 1837. It became a port, shipping produce from farmers in the region up Cayuga Lake, then by the Erie Canal to other major markets. Academies and seminaries for basic education were established in 1800. Notable schools include Cayuga Lake Academy, which was founded in 1797 and chartered by the New York State Regents in 1801. Its second structure, built in 1835, remained until it was destroyed by fire on April 19, 1945. Many prominent graduates attended the school, including President Millard Fillmore, William Brookfield, the founder of the Bushwick Glass Works; and William E. Leffingwell (1855–1927), State Assemblyman and founder of the Glen Springs Sanitarium. In 1868 Henry Wells founded Wells College for the education of women.

With changes in transportation, development of the Midwest, and other economic shifts, local agriculture declined in importance. The village is a local center with well-preserved buildings composing the Aurora Village–Wells College Historic District, listed on the National Register of Historic Places. It has come to rely on Wells College as the major employer. During the school year, nearly half the population of the village is made up of students. Since the renovations in the town and the college's 2005 decision to enroll men and become co-educational, enrollment has increased. The student body, with enrollment of 567 in 2007, had increased by a third since a few years ago.

Also listed on the National Register of Historic Places are the Aurora Steam Grist Mill (1976) and Mosher Farmstead (2003).

In December 2005, the S.H.A.R.E. (Strengthening Haudenosaunee-American Relations through Education) Farm was signed over to the Cayuga Nation of New York by US citizens who had purchased and developed the 70-acre (280,000 m^{2}) farm in Aurora, New York. This is the first substantial property which the Cayuga Nation has owned since after being forced to cede its lands after the Revolutionary War. Settlement here has meant their first chance to live within the borders of their ancestral homeland in more than 200 years.

== Notable people ==
- Frances Folsom Cleveland, First Lady of the United States and Wells College alumna
- Robert P. T. Coffin, writer, poet and professor
- Victor Hammer, painter, sculptor, printer, and typographer
- Edwin B. Morgan, congressman, a founder of The New York Times
- Lewis Henry Morgan, pioneering anthropologist and social theorist
- Edwin V. Morgan, United States Ambassador to Brazil 1912-1933
- Laura Nader, anthropologist and Wells College alumna
- Thomas J. Preston, Jr., president pro tem of Wells College; he married the widow Frances Folsom Cleveland
- John Morgan Richards, cigarette and patent medicine entrepreneur
- Pleasant Rowland, founder of the "American Girl" series of historic dolls, books, clothing and toys; Wells College alumna
- Edward Searing, Wisconsin superintendent of public instruction and educator
- Henry Wells, founder of Wells College, Wells Fargo and the American Express Company

== Changes and controversies since 2000 ==
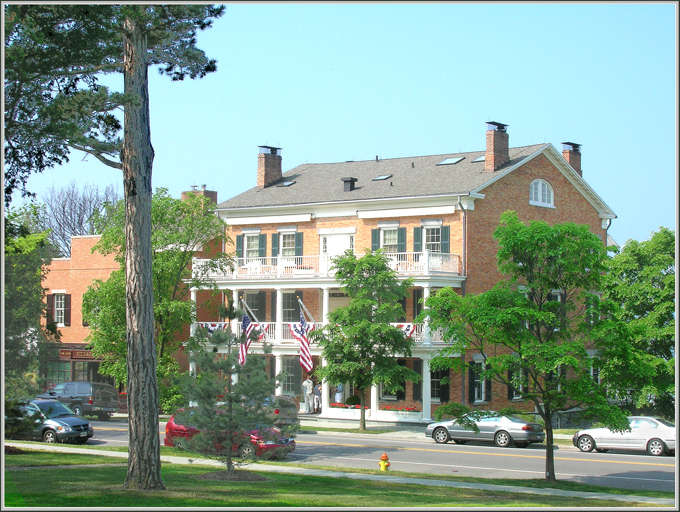
The Aurora Inn

In 2000, the board of Wells College endorsed a master plan that proposed two new buildings, demolition of some existing modern buildings and moving some historic brick buildings. They also voted to close the historic Aurora Inn on Main Street and look for a private developer to redevelop and manage it. The college's proposed changes raised concerns, especially as some of the properties and master plan were within the historic district.

In 2001, entrepreneur Pleasant Rowland together with Wells College founded the Aurora Foundation and teamed up to renovate the Aurora Inn. They acquired additional properties to renovate, including the E. B. Morgan House. In press accounts, Rowland expressed her vision of enhancing the historic character and attractiveness of the community, and of improving the local economy. Founder of the enormously successful "American Girl" dolls, she was a 1962 alumna of Wells College.

Rowland's and the Aurora Foundation's projects have drawn some criticism and concern. Because the village is so small, its fate and governance are already intertwined with Wells College, which owns half the land in the village. Critics felt that the foundation was too quick to renovate some historic structures and did not follow necessary review procedures, including that required by the State Environmental Quality Review Act (SEQRA).

The critics founded the Aurora Coalition and brought suit to stop the renovation of the inn and demolition of a neighboring grocery. The National Trust for Historic Preservation and the Preservation League of New York joined the suit because of concerns that local government was not paying enough attention to state laws requiring thorough review of projects in historic districts. The controversy continued as the foundation and proposed renovation projects gained national attention. Because some affected buildings were listed on the National Register of Historic Places, interested parties outside the community needed to review the renovations, which increased interest in the projects.

Critics were concerned about Rowland's not being a native to the area, despite her time there while attending Wells College from 1958 to 1962. They complained that she had not been accessible for consultation with the community. There was an underlying concern that Rowland's wealth allowed her to impose a vision on the community.

The State Supreme Court ruled against the Aurora Coalition and allowed the renovation of the Aurora Inn to proceed. The Appeals Court allowed the lower court's decision to stand.

Continuing economic problems in central New York and residents' differing ideas about the village kept the controversy alive. The issues served as inspiration for the satirical novel Happyland, by author J. Robert Lennon. It began running in serial form in Harper's Magazine in July 2006.

In May 2007, Rowland ended her association with Wells College and shut down the Aurora Foundation. Spokespeople said redevelopment of the village was substantially completed. Although Rowland put the local home decor firm MacKenzie-Childs up for sale, she also purchased an additional building in the village and set up a new limited liability corporation to operate her properties.

In October 2013, Rowland took personal ownership of all the properties that she renovated for Wells College and purchased several other properties to the degree that she currently owns the entire village business district along with other commercial properties.

== Geography ==
The village of Aurora is in the town of Ledyard on the eastern shore of Cayuga Lake, at (42.746782, -76.699442). Long Point State Park is south of the village.

According to the United States Census Bureau, the village has a total area of 0.92 square miles (2.38 km^{2}), all land.

=== Climate ===
According to the Köppen Climate Classification system, Aurora has a warm-summer humid continental climate, abbreviated "Dfb" on climate maps. The hottest temperature recorded in Aurora was 101 °F (38.3 °C) on July 17, 1988, while the coldest temperature recorded was −21 °F (−29.4 °C) on January 22, 1982.

Climate data for Aurora, New York, 1991–2020 normals, extremes 1956–present
Month	Jan	Feb	Mar	Apr	May	Jun	Jul	Aug	Sep	Oct	Nov	Dec	Year
Record high °F (°C)	68 (20)	75 (24)	85 (29)	93 (34)	94 (34)	96 (36)	101 (38)	97 (36)	98 (37)	87 (31)	81 (27)	69 (21)	101 (38)
Mean maximum °F (°C)	56.0 (13.3)	54.3 (12.4)	65.0 (18.3)	78.6 (25.9)	86.4 (30.2)	90.0 (32.2)	90.7 (32.6)	89.7 (32.1)	88.1 (31.2)	78.6 (25.9)	68.4 (20.2)	57.3 (14.1)	92.6 (33.7)
Mean daily maximum °F (°C)	31.2 (−0.4)	33.2 (0.7)	40.9 (4.9)	54.4 (12.4)	67.3 (19.6)	75.7 (24.3)	79.8 (26.6)	78.7 (25.9)	72.1 (22.3)	59.3 (15.2)	47.1 (8.4)	36.6 (2.6)	56.4 (13.5)
Daily mean °F (°C)	23.9 (−4.5)	25.3 (−3.7)	32.5 (0.3)	44.7 (7.1)	57.1 (13.9)	66.1 (18.9)	70.3 (21.3)	68.8 (20.4)	62.0 (16.7)	50.7 (10.4)	39.9 (4.4)	30.3 (−0.9)	47.6 (8.7)
Mean daily minimum °F (°C)	16.6 (−8.6)	17.4 (−8.1)	24.1 (−4.4)	35.0 (1.7)	46.9 (8.3)	56.5 (13.6)	60.8 (16.0)	58.9 (14.9)	51.9 (11.1)	42.1 (5.6)	32.6 (0.3)	23.9 (−4.5)	38.9 (3.8)
Mean minimum °F (°C)	−2.7 (−19.3)	0.3 (−17.6)	6.7 (−14.1)	22.6 (−5.2)	33.5 (0.8)	43.8 (6.6)	50.6 (10.3)	48.6 (9.2)	39.6 (4.2)	30.3 (−0.9)	19.2 (−7.1)	7.6 (−13.6)	−5.6 (−20.9)
Record low °F (°C)	−21 (−29)	−19 (−28)	−11 (−24)	3 (−16)	24 (−4)	34 (1)	43 (6)	37 (3)	27 (−3)	20 (−7)	0 (−18)	−15 (−26)	−21 (−29)
Average precipitation inches (mm)	2.08 (53)	1.85 (47)	2.63 (67)	3.26 (83)	3.13 (80)	3.78 (96)	3.76 (96)	3.37 (86)	3.83 (97)	3.80 (97)	2.94 (75)	2.56 (65)	36.99 (942)
Average snowfall inches (cm)	15.0 (38)	12.7 (32)	11.8 (30)	2.1 (5.3)	0.1 (0.25)	0.0 (0.0)	0.0 (0.0)	0.0 (0.0)	0.0 (0.0)	0.2 (0.51)	3.8 (9.7)	10.5 (27)	56.2 (142.76)
Average extreme snow depth inches (cm)	9.7 (25)	9.7 (25)	10.5 (27)	3.0 (7.6)	0.1 (0.25)	0.0 (0.0)	0.0 (0.0)	0.0 (0.0)	0.0 (0.0)	0.1 (0.25)	4.0 (10)	5.3 (13)	14.9 (38)
Average precipitation days (≥ 0.01 in)	14.4	11.3	12.8	13.9	13.3	13.0	12.4	11.2	11.7	15.3	12.8	13.7	155.8
Average snowy days (≥ 0.1 in)	8.3	7.2	5.1	1.1	0.0	0.0	0.0	0.0	0.0	0.2	2.1	5.3	29.3
Source 1: NOAA
Source 2: National Weather Service

== Demographics ==
Historical population
Census	Pop.	Note	%±
1840	500		—
1850	600		20.0%
1860	459		−23.5%
1870	450		−2.0%
1880	444		−1.3%
1890	555		25.0%
1900	499		−10.1%
1910	493		−1.2%
1920	416		−15.6%
1930	389		−6.5%
1940	372		−4.4%
1950	711		91.1%
1960	834		17.3%
1970	1,072		28.5%
1980	926		−13.6%
1990	687		−25.8%
2000	720		4.8%
2010	724		0.6%
2020	607		−16.2%
U.S. Decennial Census

As of the census of 2000, there were 720 people, 181 households, and 106 families residing in the village. The population density was 750.4 inhabitants per square mile (289.7/km^{2}). There were 225 housing units at an average density of 234.5 per square mile (90.5/km^{2}). The racial makeup of the village was 659 White, 13 African American, 2 Native American, 22 Asian, 10 from other races, and 14 from two or more races. Hispanic or Latino of any race were 14 of the population.

There were 181 households, out of which 52 had children under the age of 18 living with them, 91 were married couples living together, 13 had a female householder with no husband present, and 75 were non-families. 63 of all households were made up of individuals, and 33 had someone living alone who was 65 years of age or older. The average household size was 2.33 and the average family size was 3.10.

In the village, the population was spread out, with 13.2% under the age of 18, 46.1% from 18 to 24, 14.6% from 25 to 44, 15.1% from 45 to 64, and 11.0% who were 65 years of age or older. The median age was 22 years.

The population was 62.3% female, and 37.7% male, due to the college which has mostly female students.

The median income for a household in the village was $57,222, and the median income for a family was $64,583. Males had a median income of $31,667 versus $32,250 for females. The per capita income for the village was $17,526. About 1.8% of families and 4.8% of the population were below the poverty line, including 4.5% of those under age 18 and 5.4% of those age 65 or over.

== Education ==
The village is in the Southern Cayuga Central School District.

Wells College was mostly in the village.
