= Mosher Farmstead =

Historic house in New York, United States

- U.S. National Register of Historic Places
- U.S. Historic district
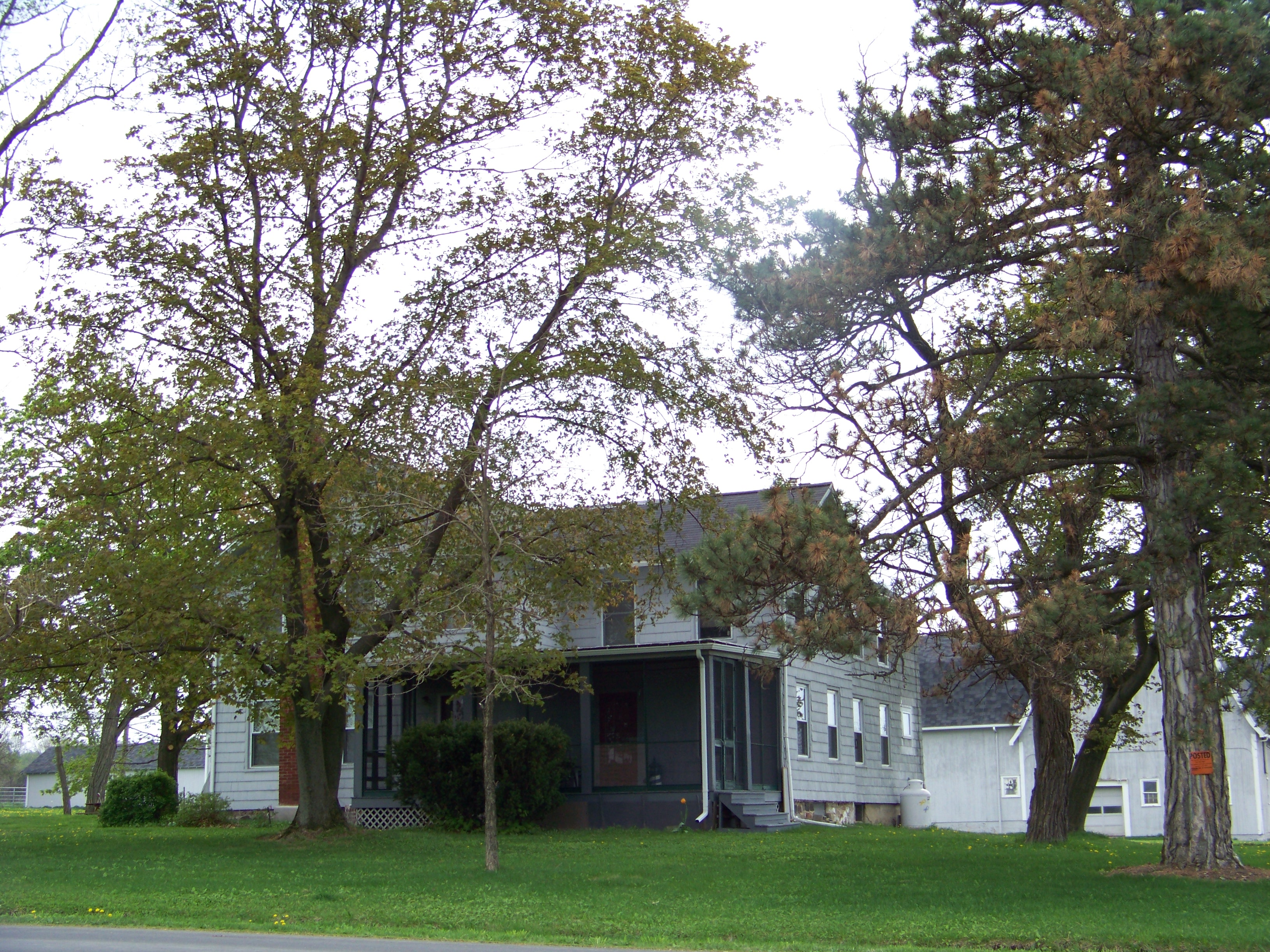

- Location within New York Location within the United States
- Location: 1016 Sherwood Rd., Aurora, New York
- Coordinates: 42°45′36″N 76°40′21″W
- Area: 178.9 acres (72.4 ha)
- Built: 1880
- NRHP reference No.: 03001280
- Added to NRHP: December 12, 2003

The Mosher Farmstead is located at 1016 Sherwood Road in Aurora, New York. The farm was established in 1887 when it was purchased by E.W. Mosher, and remains in the Mosher family today. It is significant as a largely intact example of a late eighteenth/early nineteenth century farm. Various buildings on the farm, especially the large U-shaped barn, are also significant architecturally. The entire farm was added to the National Register of Historic Places in 2003.
