= MacKenzie-Childs =

United States company founded in 1983

MacKenzie-Childs, Ltd.
- Type: Private
- Founded: 1983; 43 years ago
- Founder: Victoria MacKenzie-Childs; Richard MacKenzie-Childs
- Headquarters: Aurora, New York, U.S.
- Key people: John Ling, CEO
- Products: Home decor; Furniture; Cookware; Serveware
- Owner: Aurora Brands, LLC
- Number of employees: 250+
- Website: mackenzie-childs.com

MacKenzie-Childs, Ltd. is a manufacturer of ceramics and home decor retailer based in Aurora, New York, the brainchild of Victoria MacKenzie-Childs and Richard MacKenzie-Childs, who founded the company in 1983.

The company is recognized for its "Courtly Checks" black-and-white checkerboard pattern.

== History ==
=== Origins and early years ===
In 1983, the founders started a business making ceramic goods under the name Victoria and Richard MacKenzie Childs, Ltd. The company began in a small studio in Wallcourt Hall, a former dormitory for a preparatory school.

After the registration lapsed, the company was registered as MacKenzie-Childs, Ltd. in 1997.

=== Bankruptcy and reorganization ===
In 2000, MacKenzie-Childs, Ltd. entered Chapter 11 Bankruptcy protection following financial difficulties including a $15.3 million debt to BSB Bank & Trust, a 25 to 55 percent price increase, an expensive advertising campaign, and two long-term leases for unopened retail locations on Rodeo Drive and Madison Avenue.

BSB Bank & Trust installed MacDonell Roehm, Jr. as the new president of the company. Shortly thereafter, he began exploring ways to limit losses allegedly over the founders’ objections. Roehm contacted Pleasant Rowland, founder of American Girl, to determine her interest in investing in the company. Rowland purchased MacKenzie-Childs, Ltd. from bankruptcy court for $5.5 million in 2001, and then immediately called the loan, forcing the company into bankruptcy. Rowland's acquisition firms then bought the assets (trademarks, IP, goodwill) through a court-approved sale.

Since the founders of the company still owed a debt to BSB Bank & Trust, Rowland offered Victoria and Richard MacKenzie-Childs $10 million contingent upon a non-compete agreement. It is unclear how much of this $10 million would be in the form of a loan discharge, as a news article covering a later trademark case suggested that Rowland threatened to collect the roughly $10 million difference between what Rowland paid and the original debt the couple still owed. The founders refused to sign the agreement and Rowland, who now owned most of their personal debt, then called on their loans. This led the MacKenzie-Childs to file for personal bankruptcy, at which time they allegedly gave up all rights to the MacKenzie-Childs name.

Rowland began restructuring the home decor company to ensure its profitability. In 2005, the company laid off 20 of 240 employees and restructured the management team.

In 2007, Rowland announced her intention to find a buyer having "accomplished her turnaround goals with the company."

==== Aurora revitalization efforts ====
As part of a larger project led by the Aurora Foundation to revitalize and redevelop the village, Rowland's purchase ensured that MacKenzie-Childs, Ltd. would remain headquartered in Aurora. The company's purchase was one of many multi-million dollar investments Rowland made in Aurora, where she attended Wells College in the 1960s.

=== 2006 to current day ===
In 2006, MacKenzie-Childs, Ltd. sued founders Victoria and Richard MacKenzie-Childs. The founders had started a new business using the mark "Victoria and Richard." The lawsuit cited trademark violation, as their last name and trademarks referencing it, had allegedly been sold off in the bankruptcy proceedings. The founders countersued Rowland for attaching their name to designs they did not create.

In 2008, Rowland sold the company to Lee Feldman and Howard Cohen, partners at the Twin Lakes Capital equity firm based in Rochester and Manhattan.

In 2014, Castanea Partners, a private equity firm, invested in Aurora Brands (the owner of MacKenzie-Childs, Ltd.)

In 2018, MacKenzie-Childs, Ltd. acquired Patience Brewster Inc. The terms of the acquisition were not disclosed. Patience Brewster, an upstate New York book illustrator and ornament designer, joined the company's creative team. MacKenzie-Child, Ltd. and Brewster pursued the design and development of products for the Patience Brewster by MacKenzie-Childs collection.

== Annual events ==
MacKenzie-Childs, Ltd. is well-known for its annual Barn Sale. The company headquarters were built on a dairy farm built in the late 1800s and renovated between 2001 and 2003. Prior to moving to the renovated Aurora dairy farm, for a time, Victoria and Richard operated their studio and shop in the basement of the Fargo Inn, a popular "watering hole" in the village of Aurora near Wells College. The sale began in a single tent in 1996 and grew to thousands of customers at the Aurora-based campus every year.

In 2017, the Barn Sale drew more than 26,000 shoppers to the company's sixty five acre property in Aurora, making the event one of the premier draws for tourists in Cayuga County. Held over four days, the sale offers discounts off retail price.

After the onset of the COVID-19 pandemic in 2020, the MacKenzie-Childs Barn Sale moved online-only. The Barn Sale resumed in-person shopping in July 2023.
