= Lee Feldman (businessman) =

American lawyer and businessman

- Born: Lee Michael Feldman; 1967 or 1968 (age 57–58)
- Education: Columbia University (JD)
- Occupations: Lawyer and businessman
- Title: Chairman, GVC Holdings; Managing partner, Twin Lakes Capital Management, LLC

Lee Michael Feldman (born 1967/1968) is an American lawyer and businessman. Feldman is the managing partner of the private equity firm, Twin Lakes Capital Management, LLC. and the former chairman of GVC Holdings, the FTSE 100 Index gambling conglomerate.

== Education ==
Feldman earned a bachelor's degree and a juris doctor in law from Columbia University.

== Career ==
Feldman started his career as a corporate lawyer for O'Sullivan, Graev and Karabell. He was a partner at Softbank Capital Partners. In December 2004, Feldman joined GVC Holdings and became the non-executive chairman in September 2008.

=== Private equity firm ===
In 2007, Feldman co-founded the private equity firm, Twin Lakes Capital Management, LLC. The private equity firm focuses on branded consumer products, media and business services. Twin Lakes Capital Management, LLC., purchased Mackenzie-Childs, Ltd., from Pleasant Rowland in 2008. Lee was appointed the Chief Executive Officer of Aurora Brands when his firm led the acquisition. Feldman served as CEO of Aurora Brands, a holding company with interest in manufacturing and distributing home furnishing products, from 2007 to 2014. Aurora Brands is the owner of home decor and furnishing companies MacKenzie-Childs, Ltd., and Jay Strongwater.

=== Earnings & departure at GVC Holdings ===
In 2017, Feldman and the CEO of GVC, Kenny Alexander earned a total of £26.9 million, and 44% of shareholders voted against the company's remuneration report. In March 2019, Sky News reported that Feldman would leave the GVC Holdings on or before the company's "annual general meeting next year". Feldman was overdue to leave under UK corporate governance code, which recommends chairs of listed companies not stay in position longer than nine years. The news of his departure came two weeks after Feldman sold £6m worth of his GVC shares; the CEO, Kenny Alexander, also sold shares worth £13.7m, which led to GVC Holding's share price falling nearly 18% in a single day. Alexander and Feldman both sold 3 million GVC shares at a low price of 666 pence, seen by investors as a lack of confidence in the bookmaker.

=== Legal Issues ===
Feldman is facing bribery and fraud charges in relation to GVC Holdings' former Turkish division, and he denies all wrongdoing.
