= Aurora Village–Wells College Historic District =

Historic district in New York, United States

- Aurora Village–Wells College; Historic District
- U.S. National Register of Historic Places
- U.S. Historic district
- Location within New York Location within the United States
- Location: Aurora, New York
- Coordinates: 42°45′1″N 76°42′0″W
- Built: 1793
- Architect: Otis, Calvin N.; Mandell, Samuel; Skidmore, Owings & Merrill
- Architectural style: Mid-19th Century Revival, Early Republic, Late Victorian
- NRHP reference No.: 80002595
- Added to NRHP: November 19, 1980

The historic village of Aurora, Cayuga County, New York, rises on a hill above the eastern shore of Cayuga Lake, in the town of Ledyard. The village was named by Captain Benjamin Ledyard, who settled there in 1793, in the post-Revolutionary development of the Finger Lakes region. Up until the mid-nineteenth century, Aurora played an important part in the history of Central New York.

County seat for first Onondaga County and later Cayuga County, the village was also a leading market town in the region. A steam-powered flour mill was built in 1817, the first of its kind west of Albany, and contributed to Aurora's role as a commercial point. Aurora was a major shipping point for goods bound up the Lake and through the Erie Canal, until the canal's role was taken by railroads in the mid-19th century.

Its notable business entrepreneurs included Henry Wells, founder of American Express and Wells Fargo, whose express mail and banking services spanned New York state and reached to the developing state of California. Having earned capital in shipping and trade, Edwin Barber Morgan invested with Wells and served as a director for Wells Fargo for years. In addition, Morgan founded the United States Express Company, which provided express mail to the South, and he was an early investor in The New York Times. Wells and Morgan are also responsible for two of the historic houses that make up the district. Wells founded Wells Seminary, later Wells College, in 1868, which Morgan also supported.

In 1980, the Aurora Village–Wells College Historic District was entered on the National Register of Historic Places.

== Aurora Village properties ==
The contributing properties in the village of Aurora are of varied architectural styles and periods. They include commercial buildings, the Masonic temple, three churches, residential homes, barns and two cemeteries.

=== Commercial properties ===
The vernacular-design Patrick Tavern was built in 1793 and is the oldest building in the village. Built in 1898 through funds from Louise Morgan Zabriskie, the Tudor Revival style Aurora Free Library/Morgan Opera House served until 1996 as the public library and town hall. The brick, Greek Revival style Aurora Inn was built in 1833. A complete renovation was completed in 2003. The Shakelton Funeral Home is a large, white, neo-classical wooden structure built in 1903-1904.

Solomon Myers, a mason, built The Bank of local limestone circa 1840 for use as his home. In 1864 the second owner sold the building to a consortium forming the First National Bank of Aurora. At that time, several physical improvements were made and the Italianate features were added before the bank opened. Edwin Barber Morgan had the E. B. Morgan House built in 1857-1858. It was designed by New York City architect Joseph C. Wells, who also designed the Presbyterian Church in Aurora. The stone mansion on the shore of Cayuga Lake now operates as a bed and breakfast. Other commercial properties that contribute to the district include: the Shakelton Hardware Store, the Aurora Office Building, Mack's Drug Store, the Aurora Village Hall, the White Elephant Shop, the Aurora IGA, and the Thompson Block.

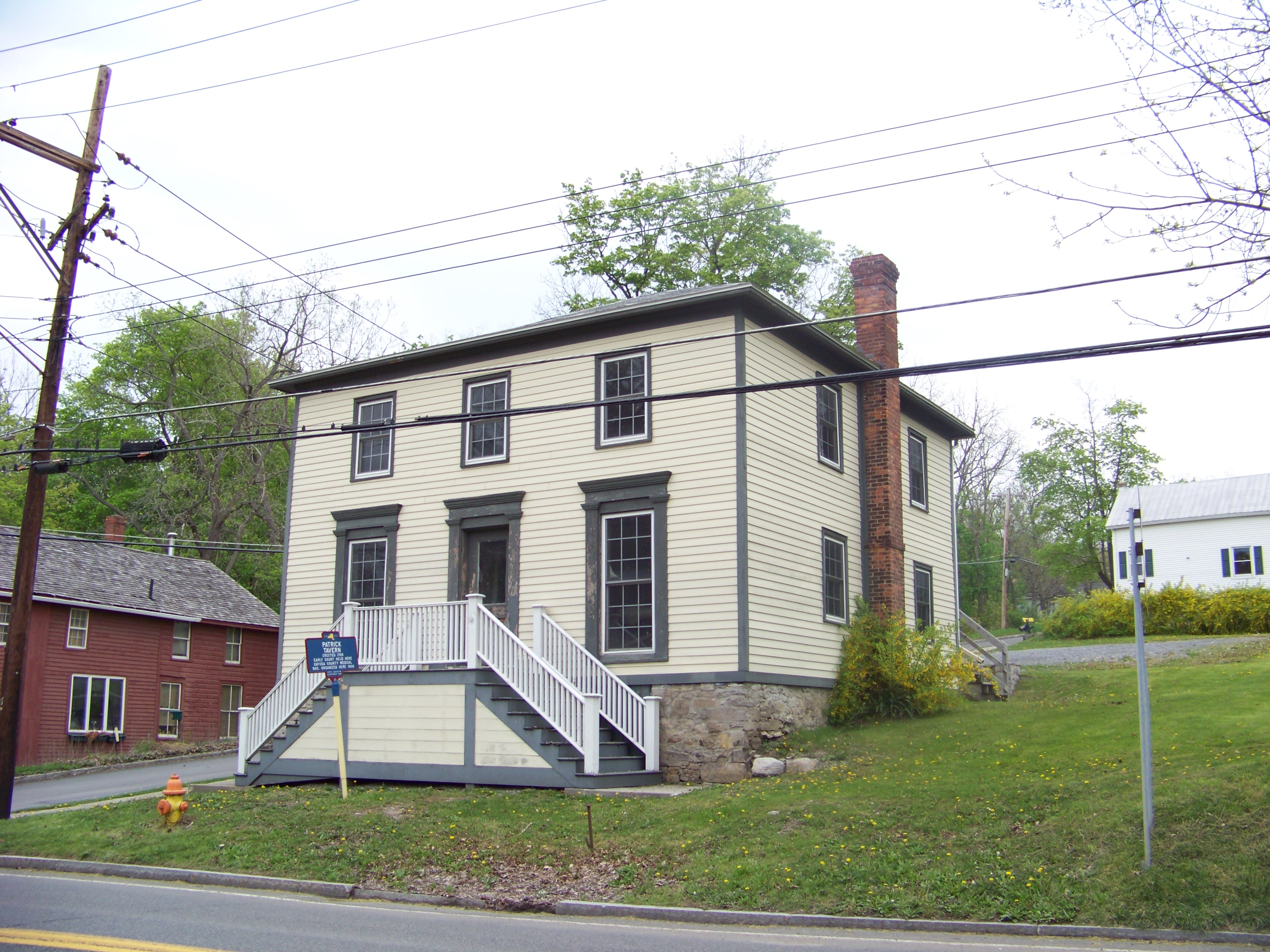
Patrick Tavern

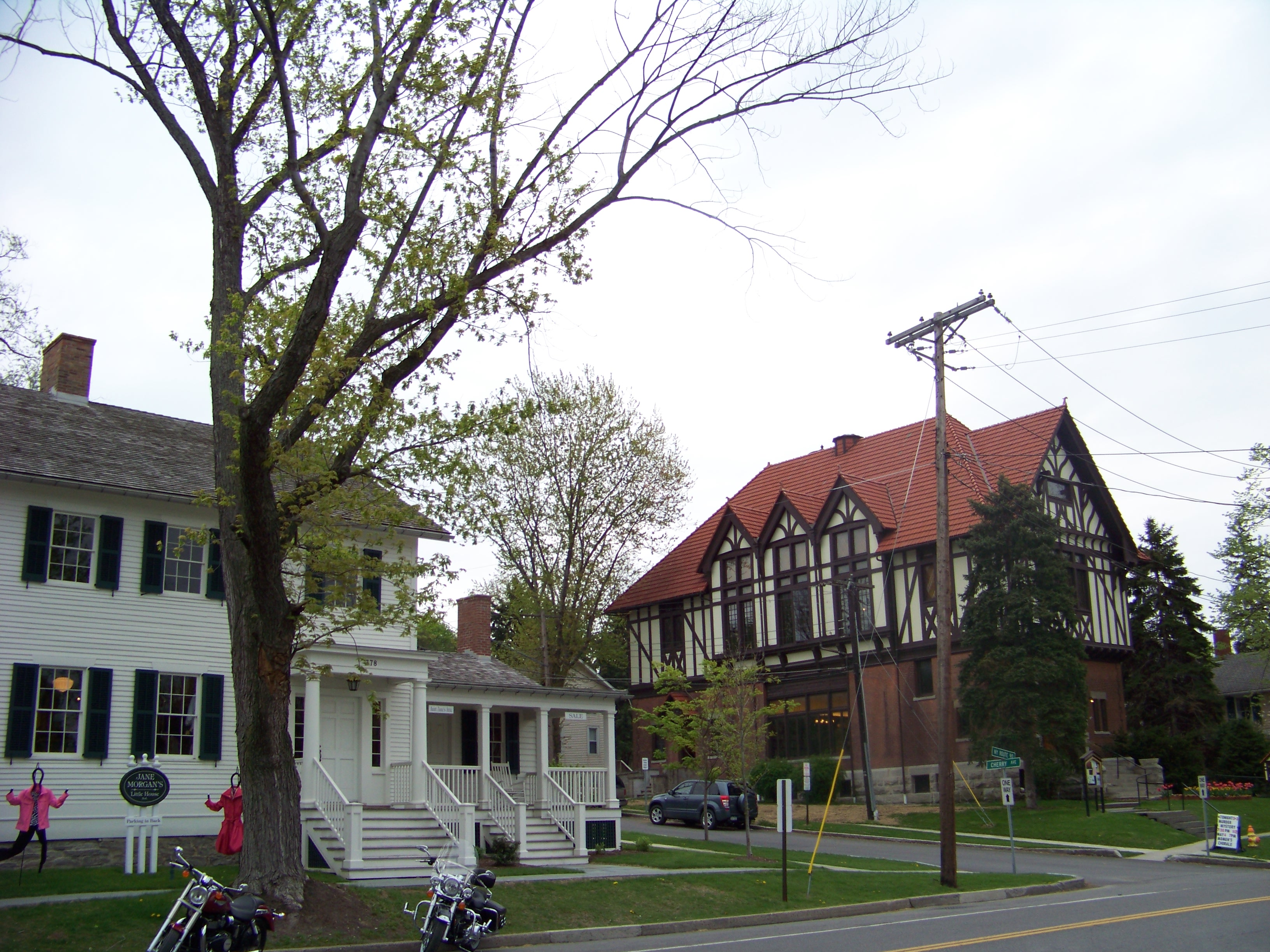
Aurora Free Library/Morgan Opera House (right)

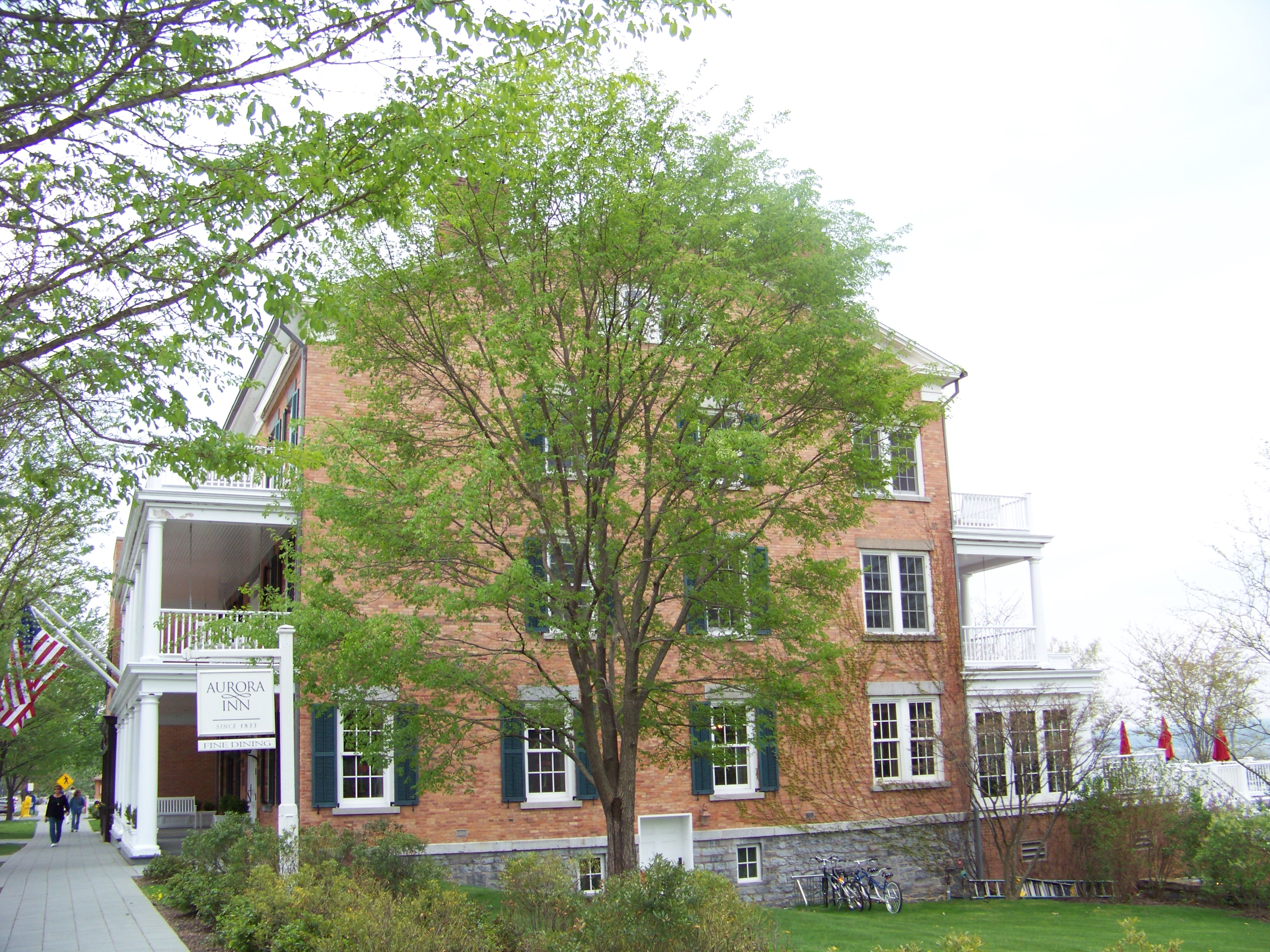
Aurora Inn

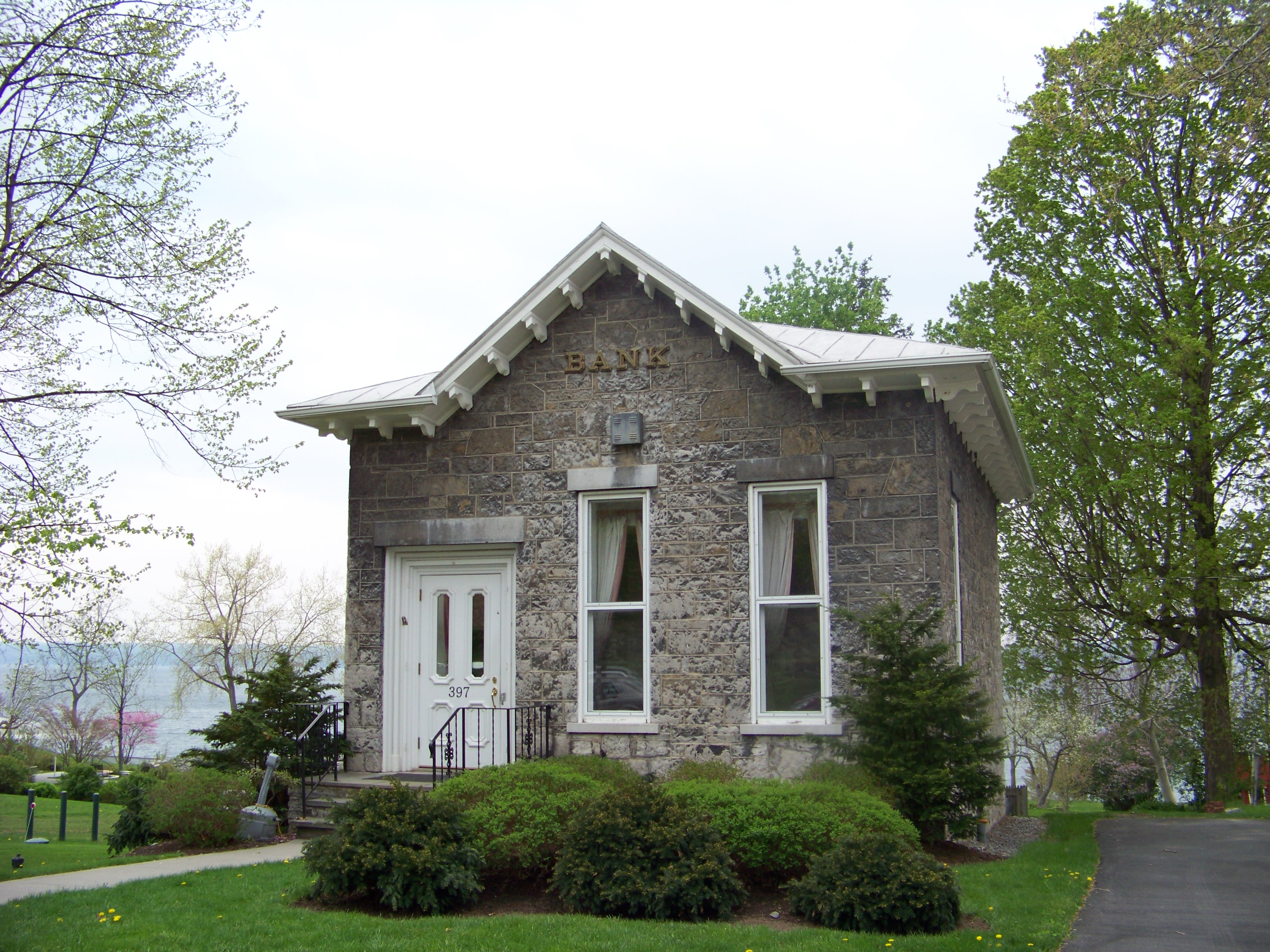
The Bank

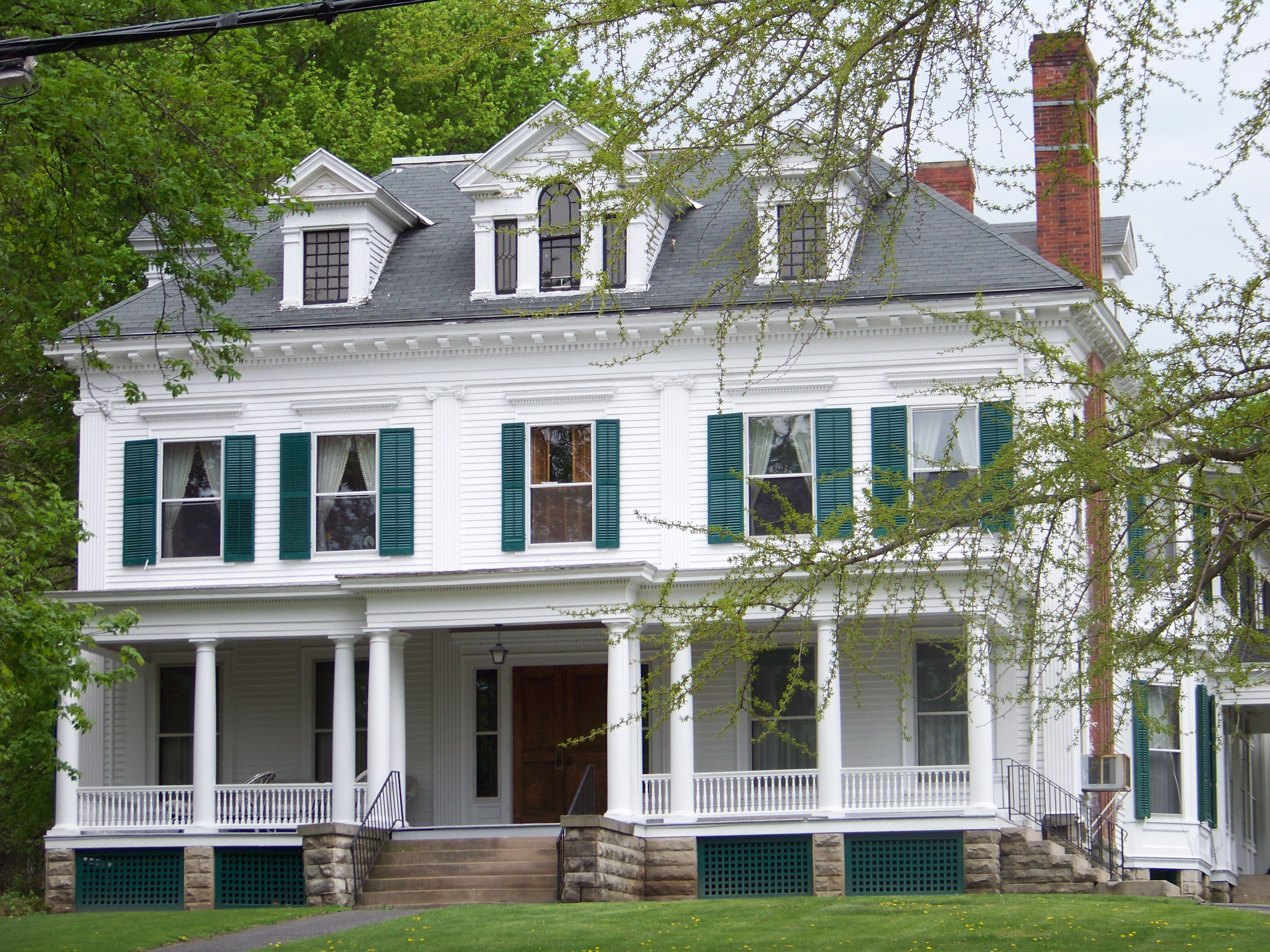
The Shakelton Funeral Home

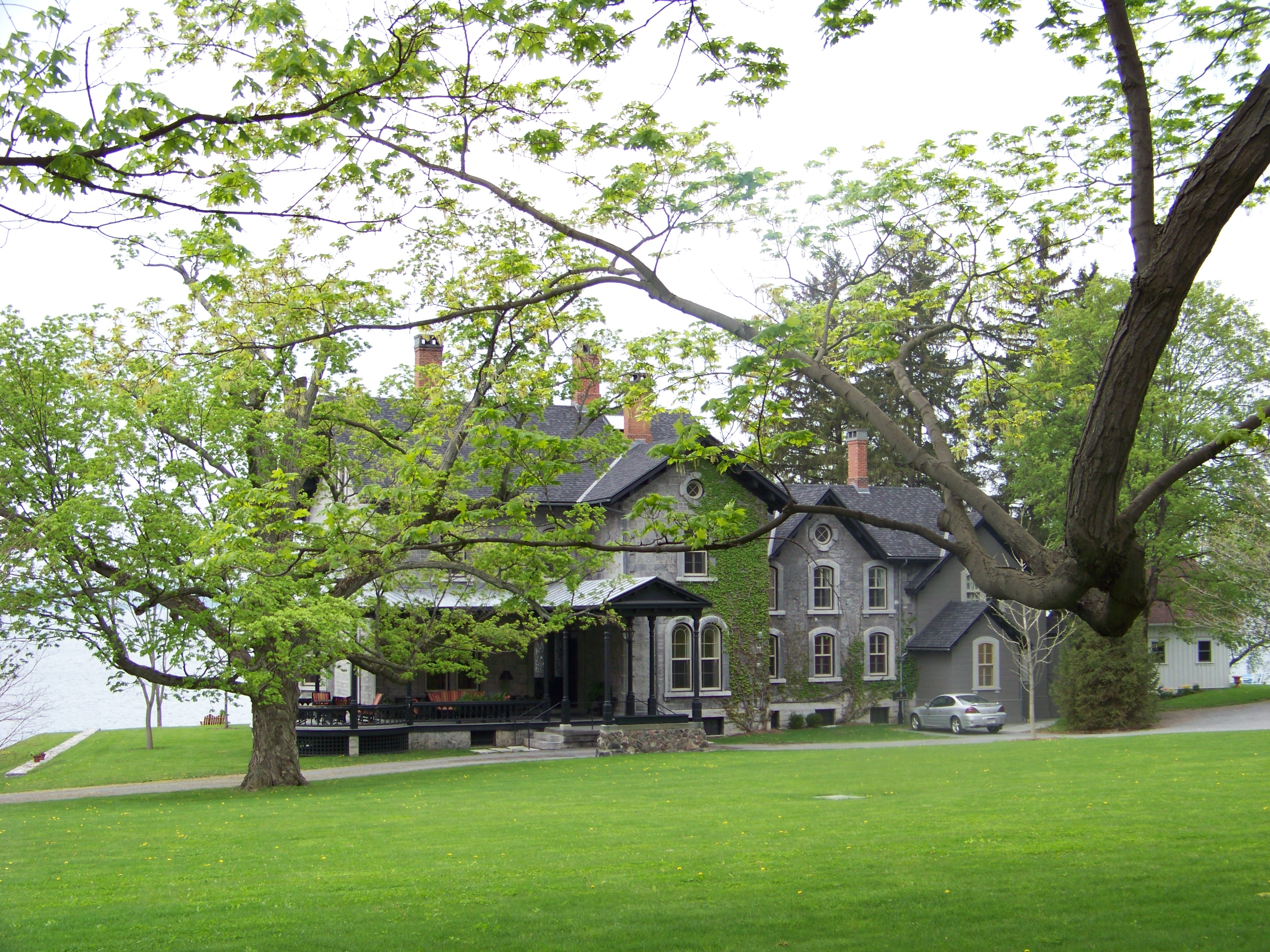
E. B. Morgan House

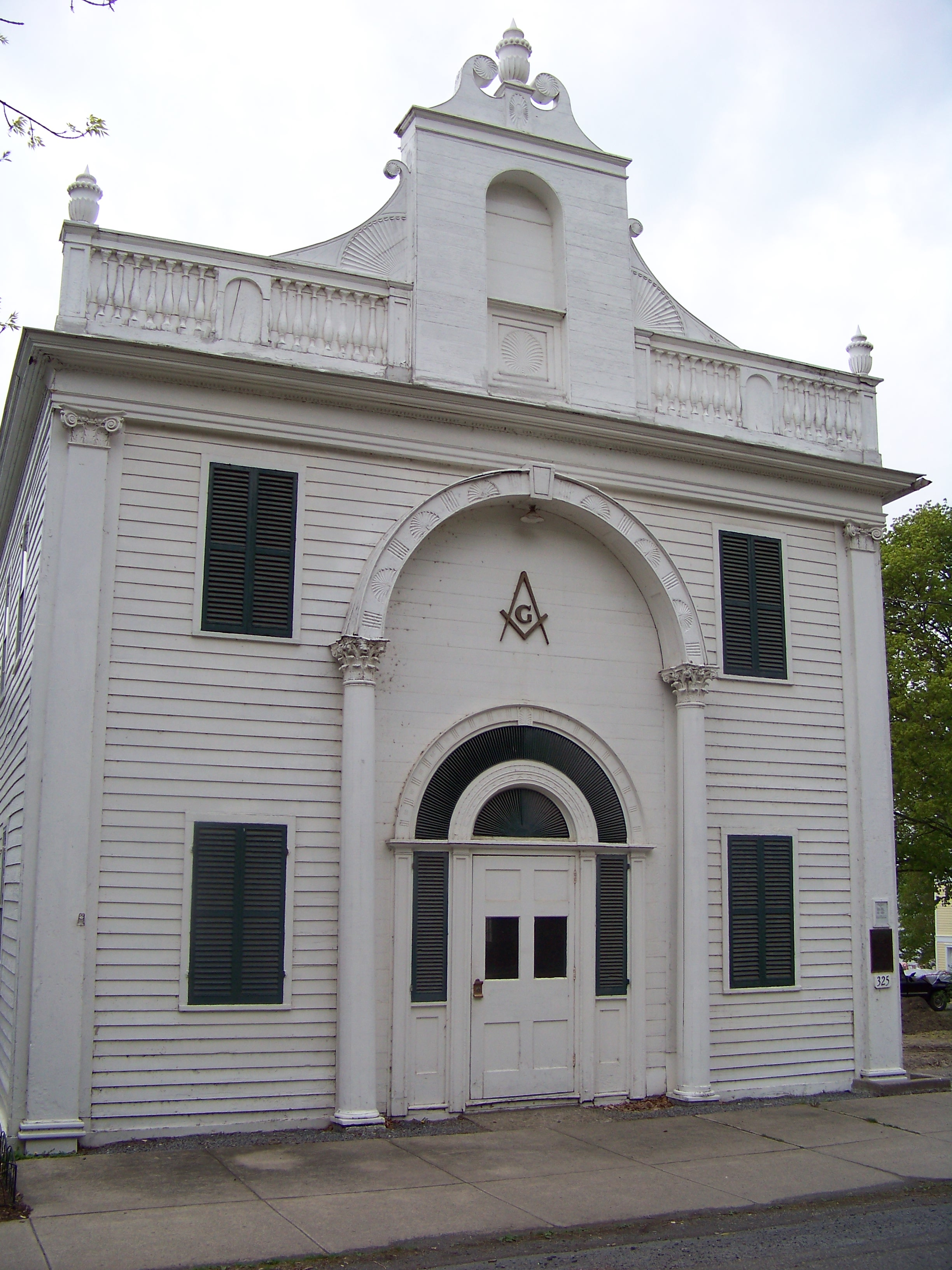
Scipio Lodge #110

=== Masonic Lodge ===
Robert Livingston, who administered George Washington's oath of office and was Grand Master of the Masons, signed the charter for the Masonic Lodge in Aurora, received in 1797. It is known as the Scipio Lodge #110. New York State Governor DeWitt Clinton, also Grand Master of the Masons, laid the cornerstone for the existing structure in 1819. The Masonic emblems incorporated in the design of the structure survive to this day.

=== Churches ===
Three churches contribute to the historic district. The Presbyterian Church, built in 1860, is of Romanesque design, with a Gothic steeple. It was designed by New York City architect Joseph C. Wells, who also designed the E. B. Morgan House. St. Paul's Episcopal Church is Greek Revival in style and was built in 1870-1871. It is located on the east side of Main Street. Across the street is St. Patrick's Catholic Church, built in 1873 of Italianate design. Both were designed by local architect Samuel Mandell.

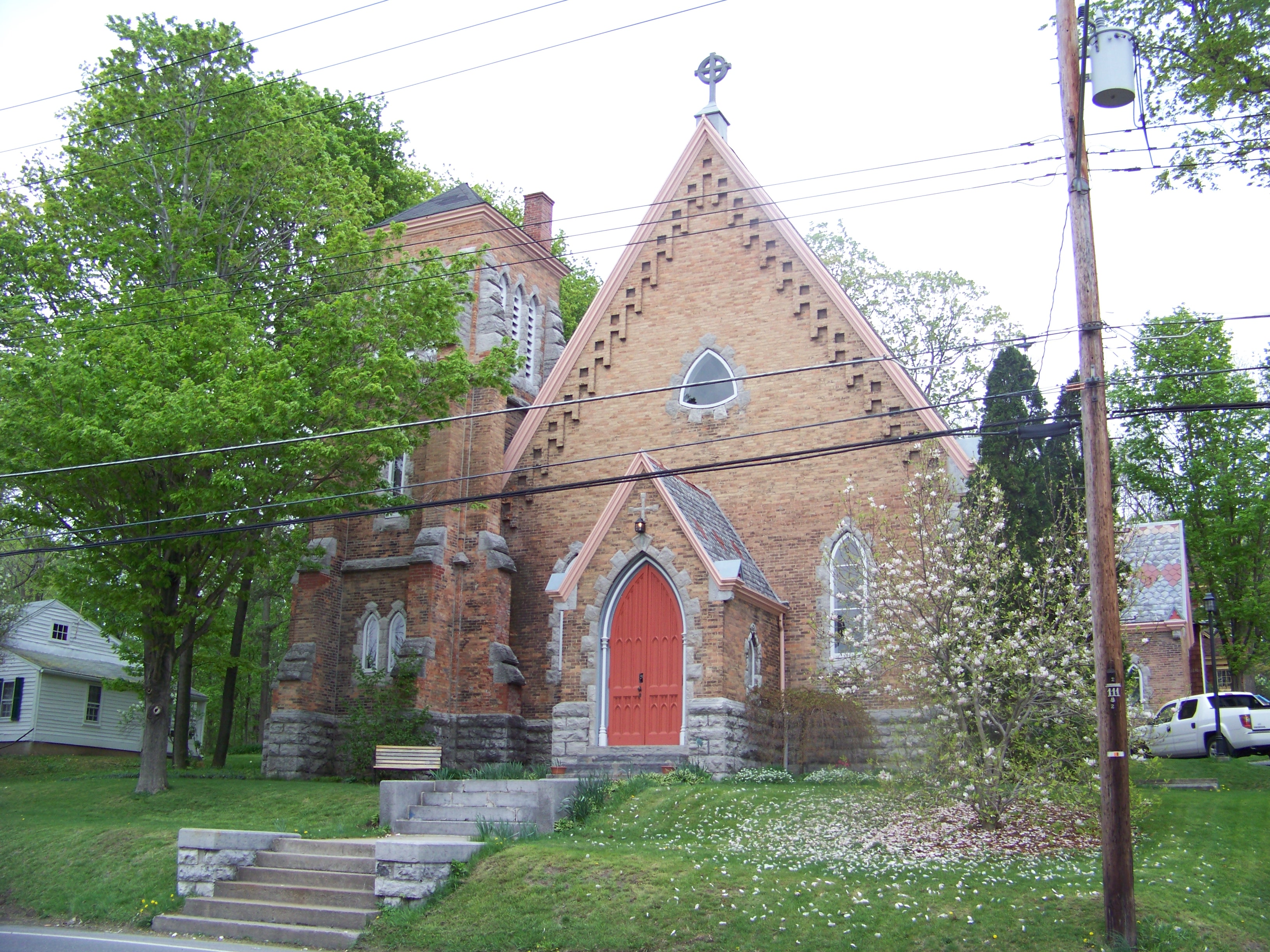
St. Paul's Episcopal Church

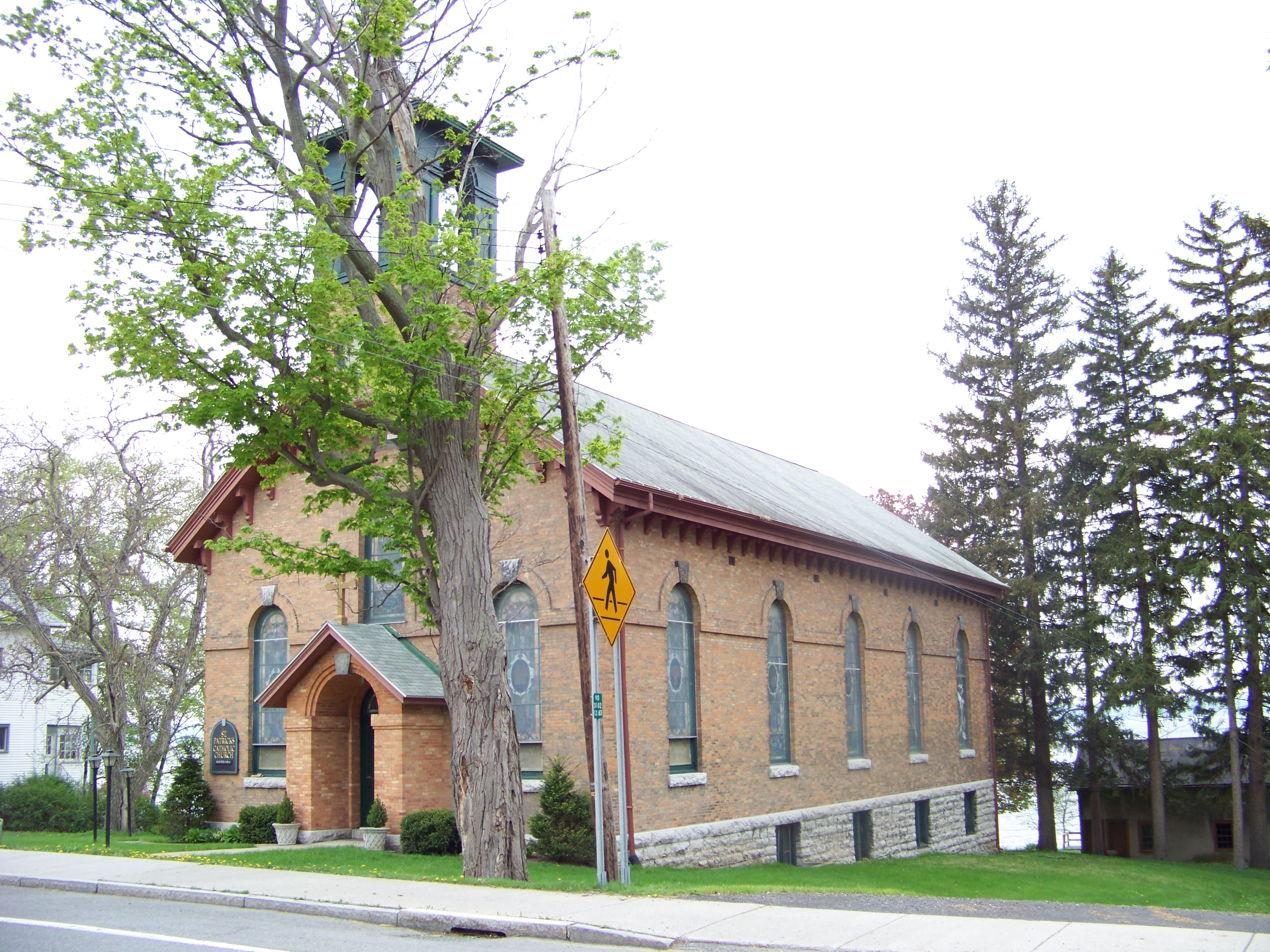
St. Patrick's Catholic Church

=== Homes ===
Over fifty homes contribute to the historic district, too many to enumerate. The imposing Taylor House on the east side of Main Street was built around 1838 and was the site of many village celebrations. Mandell House was built by local architect Samuel Mandell for his own use. It is designed in a combination of Queen Anne and Stick styles. The romantic Queen Anne-style Abbott House is at the northern end of town. The Leffingwell House was the first house built of brick in Aurora, circa 1826. The Cuyler House is the birthplace of Theodore Ledyard Cuyler, Presbyterian clergyman and writer, according to the historical marker in the front yard. The Federal-style Peter Fort House was built in 1819-1820.

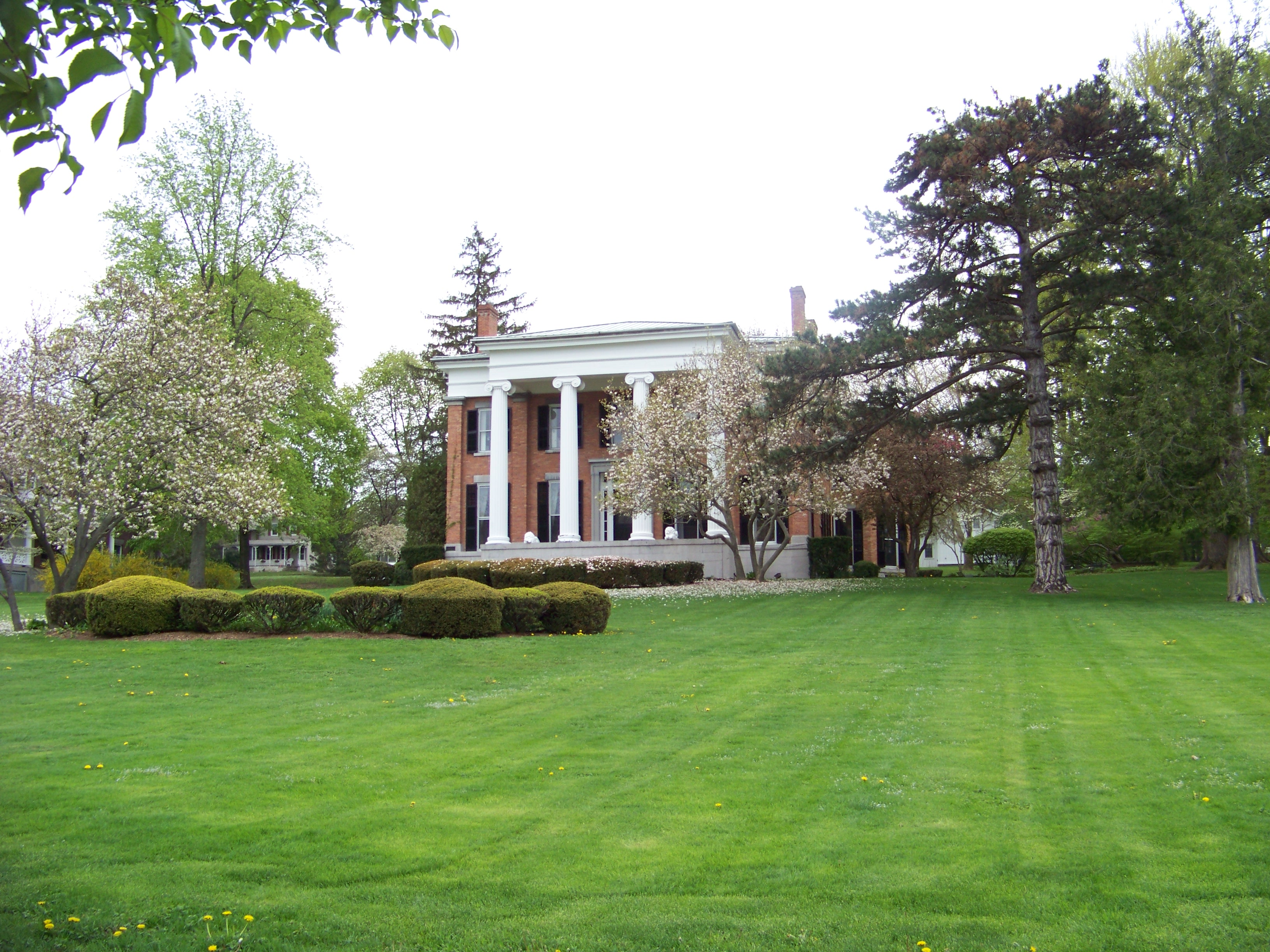
Taylor House

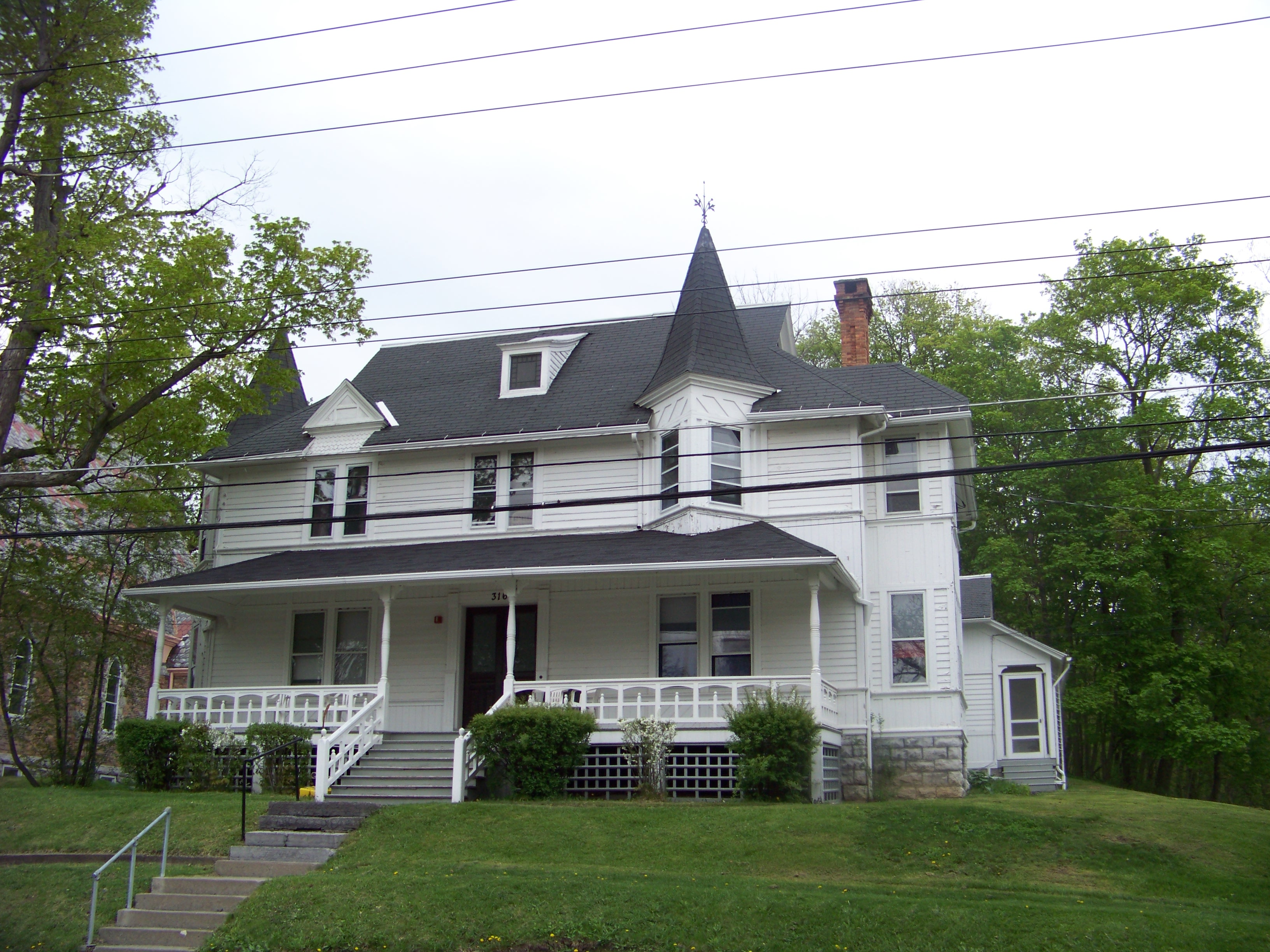
Mandell House

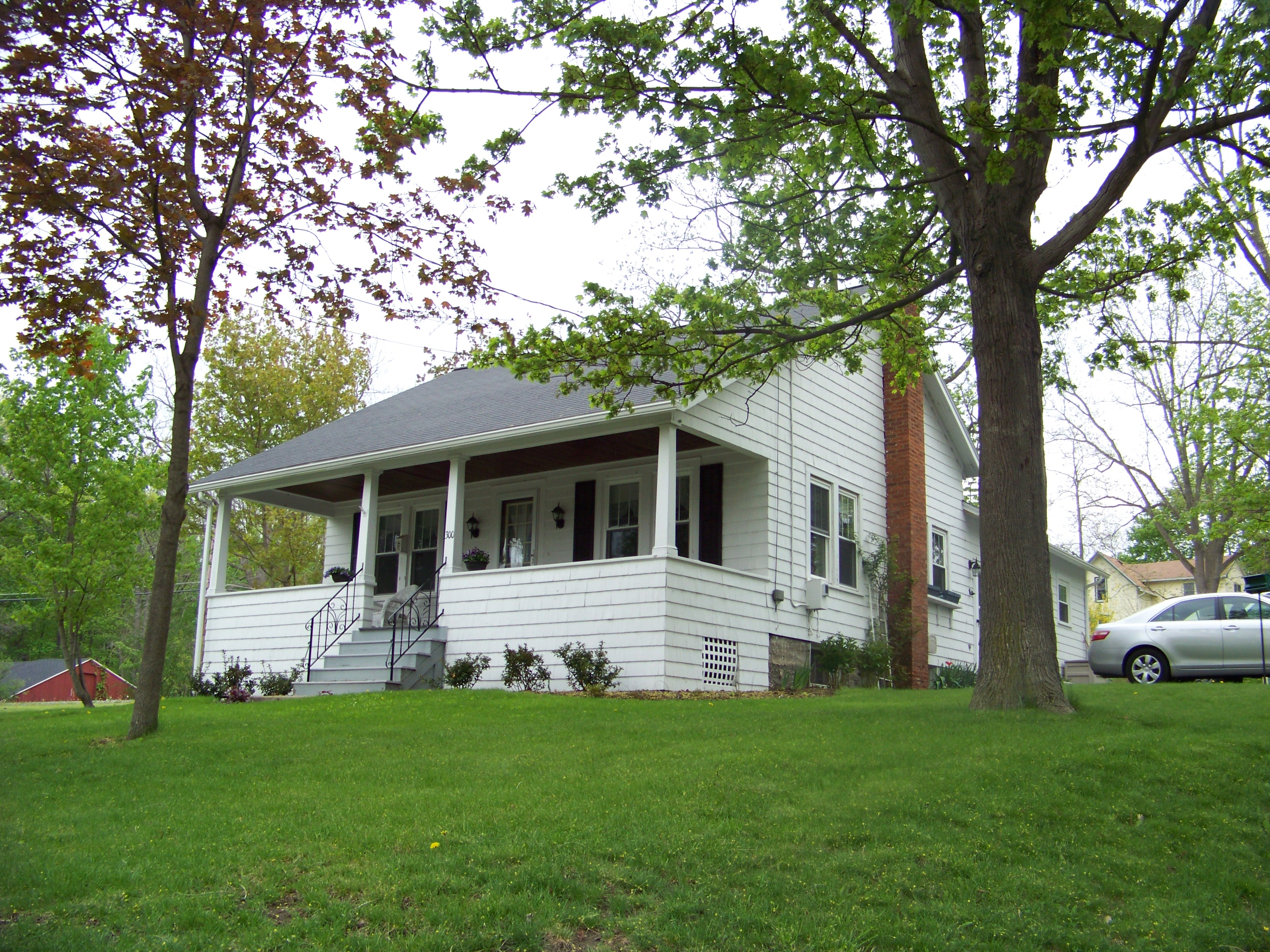
Cuyler House

== Wells College ==
In 1868, Wells Seminary, later Wells College, was founded by Henry Wells, founder of American Express (1850) and Wells Fargo (1852). The campus includes fourteen properties contributing to the historic district. Glen Park, built in 1852, was originally the home of Henry Wells and later donated to the college. The house was designed in two sections, the original portion by architect Calvin N. Otis, and the second by Samuel Mandell, architect of the original Wells College Main Building (Dieckman, 1995).

Another event in the life of Henry Wells happened in 1850 — he moved with his family from New York City to Aurora to a large house that stood on the east side of Court Street in the middle of what is now Cherry Avenue. This house burned May 18, 1851, and he began planning his new home immediately. His choice of a location for his home could scarcely have turned out better either for him or for Wells College. It was part of a farm, just south of Aurora, formerly owned by John Morgan, one of the six sons of Christopher Morgan. Henry Wells purchased thirty-eight acres of this farm, a strip of land beginning at Cayuga Lake and running eastward north of the ravine. He named his estate Glen Park and located his residence on the north side of Glen Park Ravine.

The following description of Glen Park is taken from a prospectus written in 1875. "The house is of Tuscan villa architecture — the outer walls are of blue limestone, the inner of brick with a chamber between, rendering them impervious to dampness and making the rooms cool in summer and warm in winter. The partitions of the main building are of brick from the foundations upward. The halls and rooms are spacious and sunny, commanding charming views from each window."

On the newel at the bottom of the circular staircase in Glen Park is a silver plate engraved as follows: "C. N. Otis, Architect; N. H. McGrath, Builder. Erected A.D., 1852." This circular staircase is one of Glen Park's unique features.

Miss Annie MeGreevey, Mr. Mandell's housekeeper for many years, tells the story of its building. Samuel D. Mandell (1829-1917), educated as an architect, began his career away from Aurora. Early in 1852 his father wrote him that there would be plenty of work in Aurora and that he should come home. Mandell arrived just before Glen Park was completed. The architect had left the well for the circular staircase, but had postponed building it because he was not sure how best to do it. When he heard that Mandell had returned, he asked him to construct the staircase. The circular staircase in Glen Park, therefore, was the first work that Mandell did in Aurora. Afterward he was the architect of the first Wells College building, the three churches, and several residences including that of Edwin B. Morgan.

Pettibone House is a Gothic Revival structure built of stone in 1858. The Main Building was built in 1890. The Wells College Boathouse, on Cayuga Lake, was built in 1898. The science building, Zabriskie Hall, was built in 1905.

The remaining nine contributing properties on campus are Fritt House, Power House, Boyer Cottage, Macmillan Hall, South Hall, Bellinjou, Dining Hall, Cleveland Hall, and Morgan Hall. In addition, the noted architecture firm of Skidmore, Owings & Merrill designed the Louis Jefferson Long Library according to the "Field Theory" in 1968.

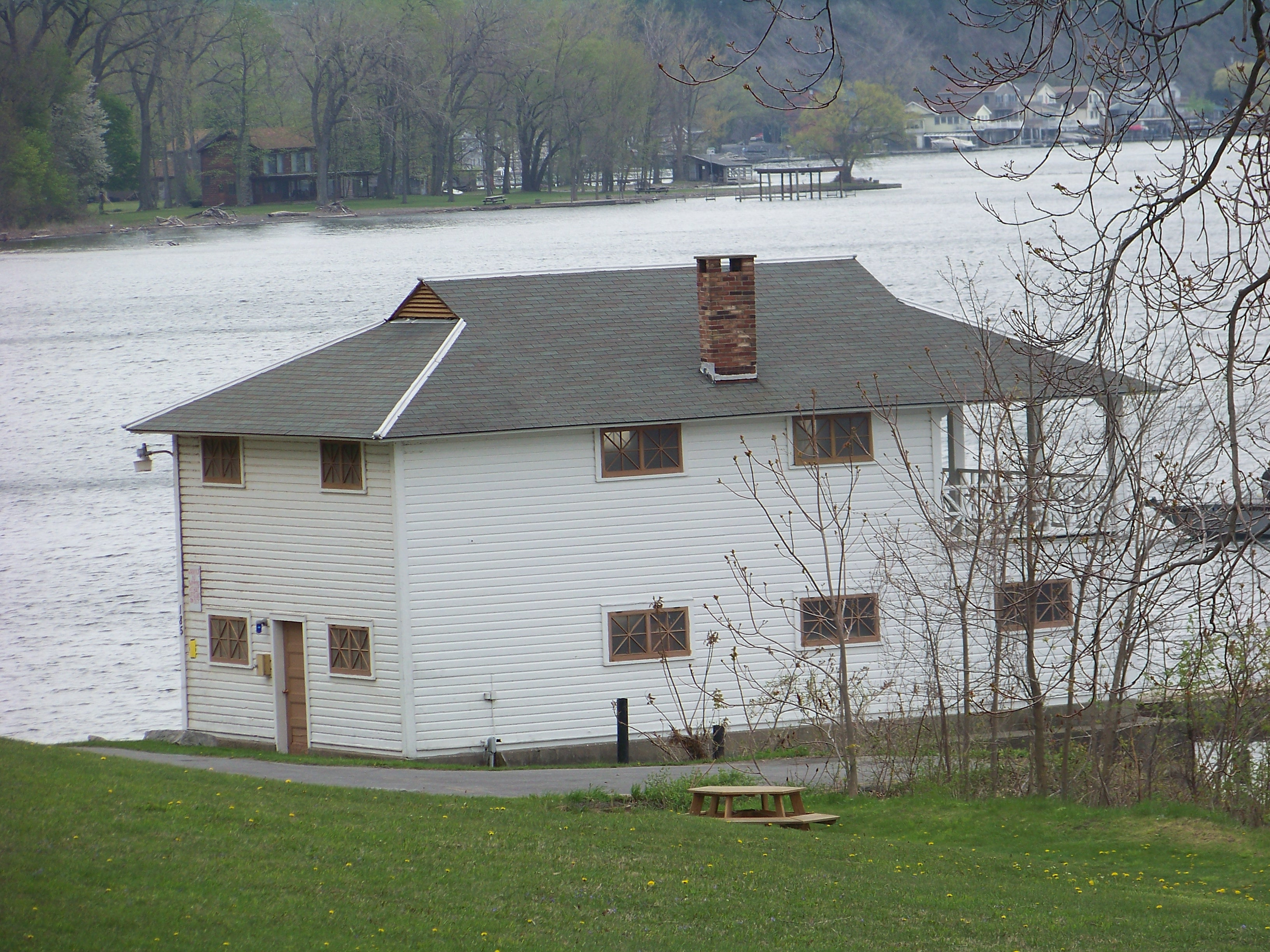
Wells College Boathouse

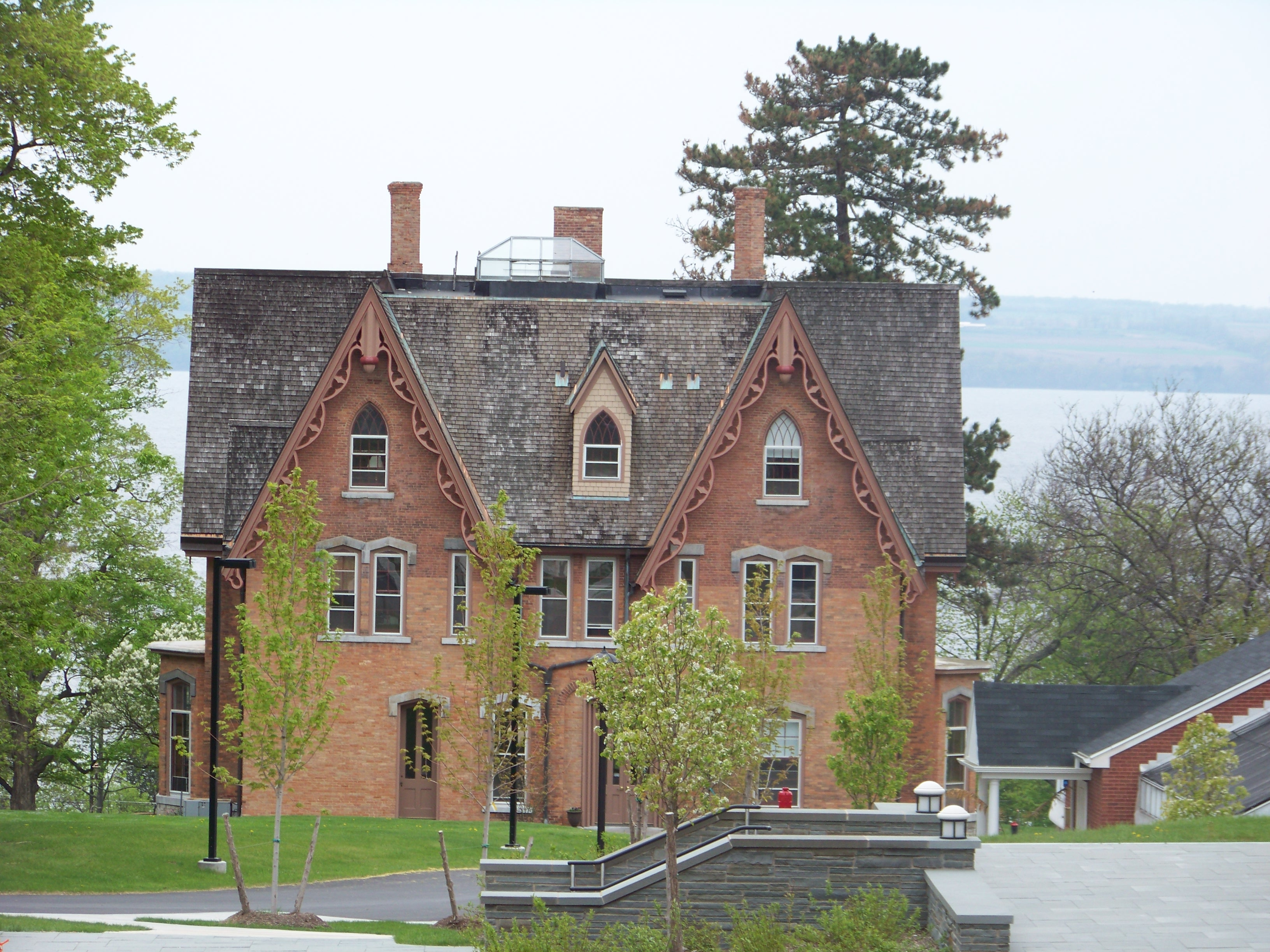
Pettibone House

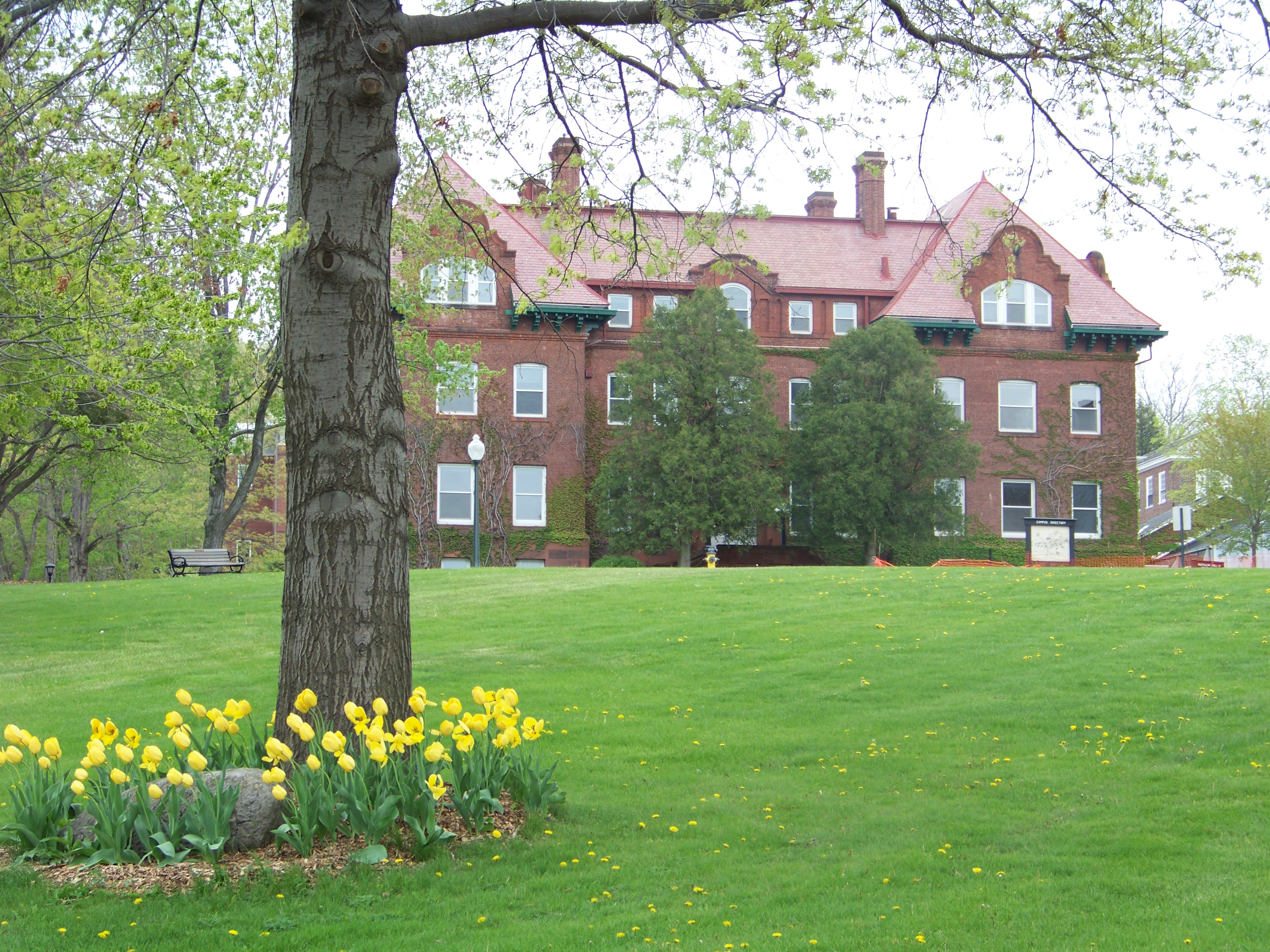
Zabriskie Hall

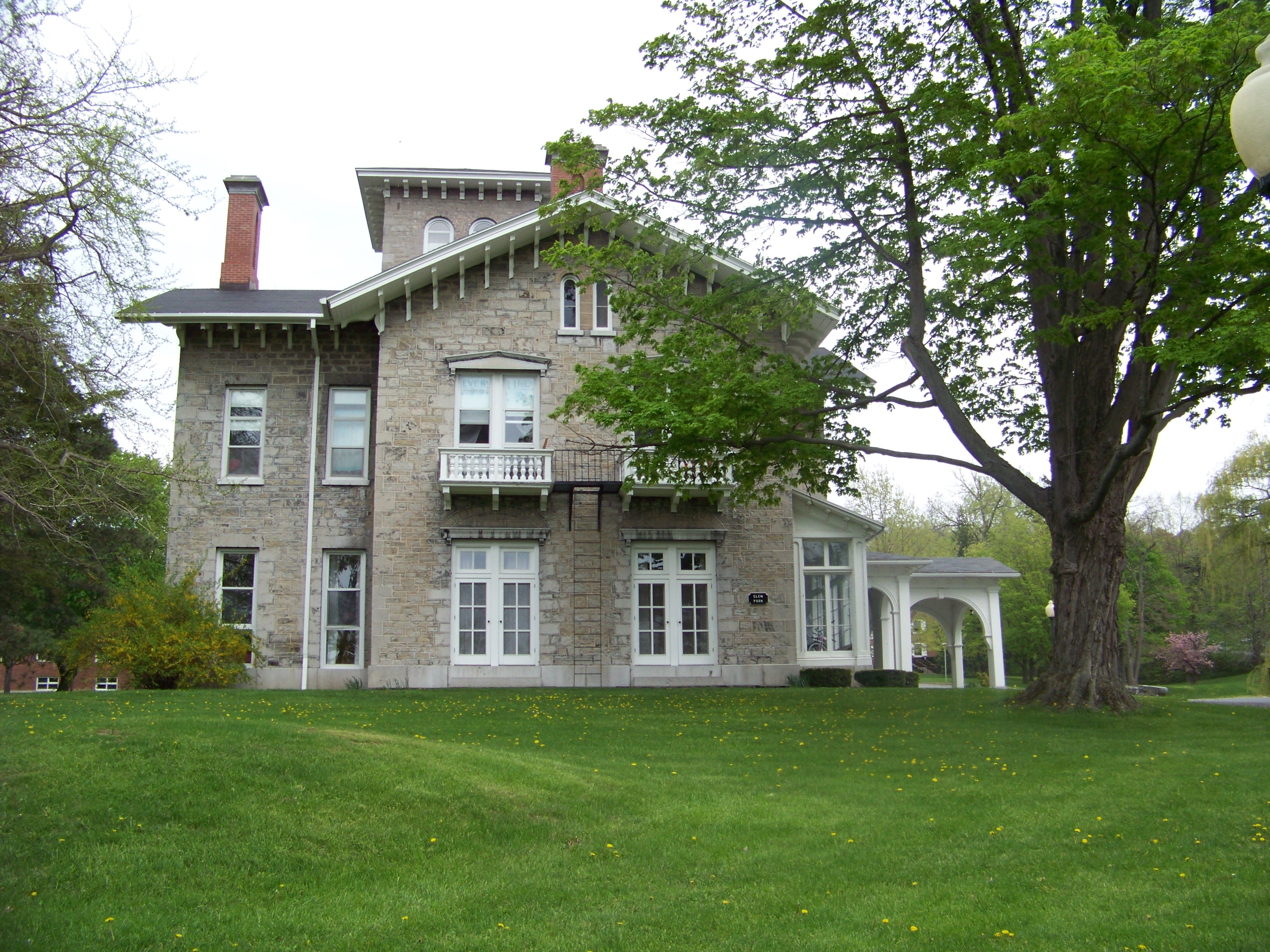
Glen Park

== See also ==
- National Register of Historic Places listings in Cayuga County, New York
