= National Register of Historic Places listings in Cayuga County, New York =

Location of Cayuga County in New York

The following is a list of the National Register of Historic Places listings located in Cayuga County, New York:

This is intended to be a complete list of properties and districts listed on the National Register of Historic Places in Cayuga County, New York. The locations of National Register properties and districts (at least for all showing latitude and longitude coordinates below) may be seen in a map by clicking on "Map of all coordinates".

This National Park Service list is complete through NPS recent listings posted August 21, 2026.

Contents: Counties in New York
Albany (Albany) – Allegany – Bronx – Broome – Cattaraugus – Cayuga – Chautauqua – Chemung – Chenango – Clinton – Columbia – Cortland – Delaware – Dutchess (Poughkeepsie, Rhinebeck) – Erie (Buffalo) – Essex – Franklin – Fulton – Genesee – Greene – Hamilton – Herkimer – Jefferson – Kings – Lewis – Livingston – Madison – Monroe (Rochester) – Montgomery – Nassau – New York (Below 14th Street, 14th to 59th Streets, 59th to 110th Streets, Above 110th Street, Islands) – Niagara (Niagara Falls) – Oneida – Onondaga (Syracuse) – Ontario – Orange – Orleans – Oswego – Otsego – Putnam – Queens – Rensselaer – Richmond – Rockland – St. Lawrence – Saratoga – Schenectady – Schoharie – Schuyler – Seneca – Steuben – Suffolk – Sullivan – Tioga – Tompkins – Ulster – Warren – Washington – Wayne – Westchester (Northern, Southern, New Rochelle, Peekskill, Yonkers) – Wyoming – Yates

== Listings county-wide ==
	Name on the Register	Image	Date listed	Location	City or town	Description
1	Henry Allen House	Henry Allen House	February 24, 1995 (#95000060)	12 E. Cayuga St. 42°42′47″N 76°25′16″W	Moravia	Italianate house built around 1877.
2	Auburn Button Works and Logan Silk Mills	Auburn Button Works and Logan Silk Mills	September 28, 2007 (#07001014)	9-11 Logan St. 42°55′40″N 76°33′52″W	Auburn	Vernacular Italianate industrial buildings.
3	Aurora Steam Grist Mill	Aurora Steam Grist Mill	July 30, 1976 (#76001207)	Main St. 42°45′15″N 76°42′15″W	Aurora	
4	Aurora Village-Wells College Historic District	Aurora Village-Wells College Historic District	November 19, 1980 (#80002595)	NY 90; 42°45′01″N 76°42′00″W	Aurora	Includes Glen Park, designed by A. J. Davis, with grounds designed by A. J. Downing; and E. B. Morgan House
5	Belt-Gaskin House	Belt-Gaskin House	October 5, 2005 (#05001135)	77 Chapman Ave. 42°55′13″N 76°34′33″W	Auburn	Home of African-American families, in succession. The Belts were born in slavery, apparently fled to Canada, came to Auburn after the Civil War.
6	Orrin W. Burritt House	Orrin W. Burritt House	August 30, 2007 (#07000864)	2696 Van Buren St. 43°02′45″N 76°33′47″W	Weedsport	
7	Case Memorial-Seymour Library	Case Memorial-Seymour Library	May 6, 1980 (#80002594)	176 Genesee St. 42°55′44″N 76°34′18″W	Auburn	
8	Cayuga County Courthouse and Clerk's Office	Cayuga County Courthouse and Clerk's Office	June 21, 1991 (#91000721)	152-154 Genesee St. 42°55′47″N 76°34′09″W	Auburn	
9	Centreport Aqueduct	Centreport Aqueduct	February 4, 2000 (#00000051)	2462 NY 31; 43°02′34″N 76°34′39″W	Weedsport	
10	Church Street-Congress Street Historic District	Church Street-Congress Street Historic District	February 3, 1994 (#92001364)	Roughly bounded by S. Main, Church, Park and Congress Sts. 42°42′36″N 76°25′07″W	Moravia	
11	Cottage Farm	Cottage Farm	November 21, 2012 (#12000952)	14475 Richmond Ave; 43°19′03″N 76°42′16″W	Fair Haven	Cottage built in 1830s in Greek Revival style, later renovated with Victorian style elements.
12	Almeron Durkee House	Almeron Durkee House	January 5, 2005 (#04001455)	13 Cayuga St. (NY-90); 42°50′03″N 76°41′45″W	Union Springs	Extremely well-preserved stone house from c.1820, and smokehouse and barn.
13	Charles Chauncey Dwight House	Charles Chauncey Dwight House	November 17, 2015 (#15000818)	149 North St. 42°56′29″N 76°34′02″W	Auburn	1835 house renovated in 1871 by Dwight, a Union Army officer and judge
14	East Genoa Methodist Episcopal Church	East Genoa Methodist Episcopal Church	January 24, 2002 (#01001500)	558 E. Genoa Rd. 42°38′44″N 76°30′19″W	Genoa	
15	Erie Canal Lock 52 Complex	Erie Canal Lock 52 Complex	September 3, 1998 (#98001146)	Maiden Ln. 43°02′13″N 76°38′06″W	Port Byron	
16	Fall Brook Point		August 24, 2026 (#100013327)	51 Fall Brook Lane; 42°49′57″N 76°20′43″W	Niles	
17	First Baptist Church of Weedsport	First Baptist Church of Weedsport	December 31, 2002 (#02001640)	Liberty St. 43°02′47″N 76°33′42″W	Weedsport	
18	First Presbyterian Church of Springport		March 14, 2025 (#100011517)	178 Cayuga St. 42°50′38″N 76°41′29″W	Union Springs	
19	Former US Post Office and Federal Courthouse	Former US Post Office and Federal Courthouse	June 11, 1991 (#91000722)	151-157 Genesee St. 42°55′49″N 76°34′12″W	Auburn	
20	William and Mary Hosmer House	William and Mary Hosmer House	April 12, 2006 (#06000262)	29 Washington St. 42°55′48″N 76°34′34″W	Auburn	Home of anti-slavery editor and author
21	House at 15 East Cayuga Street	House at 15 East Cayuga Street	April 20, 1995 (#95000472)	15 E. Cayuga St. 42°42′49″N 76°25′15″W	Moravia	Italianate-style duplex house.
22	House at 17 Aurora Street	House at 17 Aurora Street	February 24, 1995 (#95000057)	17 Aurora St. 42°42′37″N 76°25′22″W	Moravia	House built c.1850
23	House at 18 Aurora Street	House at 18 Aurora Street	February 24, 1995 (#95000058)	18 Aurora St. 42°42′39″N 76°25′24″W	Moravia	Two-story, frame Greek Revival style dwelling constructed about 1850. The structure is dominated by its three-bay, side entrance temple front.
24	House at 20 Aurora Street	House at 20 Aurora Street	February 24, 1995 (#95000059)	20 Aurora St. 42°42′39″N 76°25′24″W	Moravia	Vernacular frame house built c.1840.
25	House at 21 West Cayuga Street	House at 21 West Cayuga Street	February 24, 1995 (#95000103)	21 W. Cayuga St. 42°42′49″N 76°25′26″W	Moravia	House from c.1810-1830 in vernacular Federal style.
26	House at 31 West Cayuga Street	House at 31 West Cayuga Street	February 24, 1995 (#95000062)	31 W. Cayuga; 42°42′49″N 76°25′32″W	Moravia	Greek Revival style house
27	House at 36 South Main Street	House at 36 South Main Street	February 24, 1995 (#95000064)	36 S. Main St. 42°42′28″N 76°25′18″W	Moravia	Queen Anne style house built around 1890, and carriage barn.
28	House at 37 West Cayuga Street	House at 37 West Cayuga Street	February 24, 1995 (#95000063)	37 W. Cayuga St. 42°42′50″N 76°25′36″W	Moravia	Italianate house, with carriage house (c.1870)
29	House at 46 South Main Street	House at 46 South Main Street	February 24, 1995 (#95000065)	46 S. Main St. 42°42′25″N 76°25′16″W	Moravia	Italianate house located at what is actually now 63 S. Main St.
30	Howland Cobblestone Store	Howland Cobblestone Store	March 17, 1994 (#94000171)	N side Sherwood Rd., just E of jct. with Co. Rd. 34B; 42°45′40″N 76°37′17″W	Scipio	
31	Augustus Howland House	Augustus Howland House	May 20, 2008 (#08000448)	1395 Sherwood Rd. 42°45′37″N 76°38′51″W	Sherwood	High-style Italianate house from c.1850.
32	Charles Howland-William H. Chase House	Charles Howland-William H. Chase House	January 5, 2005 (#04001456)	188 Cayuga St. 42°50′39″N 76°41′24″W	Union Springs	Greek Revival style house built c.1840, set back from Cayuga St. (NY-90)
33	Slocum and Hannah Howland House	Slocum and Hannah Howland House	April 12, 2006 (#06000263)	1781 Sherwood Rd. 42°45′47″N 76°37′21″W	Sherwood	
34	Ezra A. Huntington House	Ezra A. Huntington House	January 31, 2020 (#100004914)	11 Seminary St. 43°56′09″N 76°33′54″W	Auburn	1861 Italianate house of first president of Auburn Theological Seminary
35	Hutchinson Homestead	Hutchinson Homestead	September 9, 2009 (#09000478)	6080 Lake St. 42°54′44″N 76°43′35″W	Cayuga	Colonial Revival-style house from c.1910.
36	William Smith Ingham House	William Smith Ingham House	April 6, 2005 (#05000263)	3069 W Main St. 43°09′58″N 76°32′15″W	Meridian	Temple-front Greek Revival house from 1835.
37	Lakeside Park	Lakeside Park	October 30, 1989 (#89001790)	NY 38A at Owasco Lake; 42°54′09″N 76°32′14″W	Owasco	Park with carousel building, now a theatre, and other structures and pathways from bygone era.
38	John McGeer House	John McGeer House	February 24, 1995 (#95000056)	7 Aurora St. 42°42′37″N 76°25′21″W	Moravia	Italianate house built in 1871 and wagon shop.
39	Mentz Church	Mentz Church	September 24, 2004 (#04001064)	Mentz Church Rd. at McDonald Rd. 42°59′53″N 76°40′39″W	Montezuma	
40	Moravia Union Cemetery	Moravia Union Cemetery	November 7, 1995 (#95001278)	NY 38; 42°42′07″N 76°25′04″W	Moravia	Also known as the Dry Creek Cemetery, this can be accessed from the Fillmore Glen park or from behind a school.
41	Morse Farm	Morse Farm	February 24, 1995 (#95000067)	52 S. Main St. 42°42′23″N 76°25′12″W	Moravia	Oldest house in Moravia, and barn
42	Mosher Farmstead	Mosher Farmstead	December 12, 2003 (#03001280)	1016 Sherwood Rd. 42°45′36″N 76°40′21″W	Aurora	
43	New Hope Mills Complex	New Hope Mills Complex	March 15, 2005 (#05000158)	Glen Haven Rd. and NY 41A; 42°47′55″N 76°20′49″W	New Hope	
44	New York State Barge Canal	New York State Barge Canal	October 15, 2014 (#14000860)	Linear across county 43°04′14″N 76°33′25″W	Aurelius, Brutus, Cato, Conquest, Mentz, Montezuma	Successor to Erie Canal approved by state voters in early 20th century to compete with railroads.
45	North Main Street Historic District	North Main Street Historic District	February 3, 1993 (#92001365)	N. Main St. and part of Keeler Ave. 42°42′54″N 76°25′19″W	Moravia	Residential historic district of 44 contributing buildings, many of Italianate style built during Moravia's post-Civil War prosperity.
46	North Street Friends Meetinghouse	North Street Friends Meetinghouse	December 9, 2005 (#05001386)	2960 Brick Church Rd. 42°45′48″N 76°39′04″W	Ledyard	
47	Job and Deborah Otis House	Job and Deborah Otis House	May 29, 2008 (#08000468)	1882-1886 Sherwood Rd. 42°45′39″N 76°36′55″W	Sherwood	Federal style house from 1796, and two-story carriage barn.
48	Owasco Reformed Church	Owasco Reformed Church	April 27, 2010 (#10000223)	5105 Rte 38A (E. Lake Rd.); 42°51′17″N 76°27′55″W	Owasco	
49	William Richardson House	William Richardson House	March 15, 2005 (#05000160)	5494 Cross Rd. 42°53′03″N 76°40′56″W	Union Springs	Late Federal / early Greek Revival house from c.1830.
50	Sager House	Sager House	February 24, 1995 (#95000061)	12 W. Cayuga St. 42°42′50″N 76°25′24″W	Moravia	Queen Anne style house built in 1884
51	St. Peter's Episcopal Church Complex	St. Peter's Episcopal Church Complex	January 24, 2002 (#01001508)	169 Genesee St. 42°55′47″N 76°34′18″W	Auburn	
52	Sand Beach Church	Sand Beach Church	June 10, 1975 (#75001176)	S of Auburn on NY 38; 42°54′12″N 76°32′49″W	Auburn	Vernacular Romanesque Revival church
53	Schines Auburn Theatre	Schines Auburn Theatre	March 15, 2000 (#94001333)	12-14 South St. 42°55′52″N 76°33′56″W	Auburn	
54	Seneca River Crossing Canals Historic District	Seneca River Crossing Canals Historic District	December 9, 2005 (#05001397)	Off NY 90; 43°00′32″N 76°42′45″W	Montezuma	Extends into Tyre in Seneca County.
55	Sennett Federated Church and Parsonage	Sennett Federated Church and Parsonage	October 5, 2005 (#05001130)	777 Weedsport-Sennett Rd. 42°59′45″N 76°32′01″W	Sennett	Church built in 1848 for a Congregationalist following, later becoming church for unified Baptist and Congregational churches of the hamlet of Sennett.
56	William H. Seward House	William H. Seward House	October 15, 1966 (#66000504)	33 South St. 42°55′33″N 76°33′59″W	Auburn	
57	Sherwood Equal Rights Historic District	Sherwood Equal Rights Historic District	February 29, 2008 (#08000096)	Sherwood Rd. & NY 34B; 42°45′40″N 76°37′17″W	Sherwood	
58	South Street Area Historic District	South Street Area Historic District	March 9, 1991 (#91000109)	Roughly, South St. and adjacent properties from Metcalf Dr. to Lincoln St. 42°55′47″N 76°33′45″W	Auburn	
59	Sterling District No. 5 Schoolhouse	Sterling District No. 5 Schoolhouse	October 10, 2002 (#02001119)	NY104A; 43°19′25″N 76°38′51″W	Sterling	Schoolhouse built around 1853, now the Sterling Historical Society Museum.
60	Sterling Grist Mill Complex	Sterling Grist Mill Complex	January 24, 2002 (#01001498)	1332 NY 104A; 43°19′31″N 76°38′49″W	Sterling	Frame mill building built about 1835, rubble foundation of an 1859 tannery, and a dam and penstock built about 1900.
61	Thompson AME Zion Church	Thompson AME Zion Church	April 2, 1999 (#99000349)	33 Parker St. 42°55′24″N 76°34′34″W	Auburn	Part of a National Historic Landmark
62	Frank and Eliza Tryon House	Frank and Eliza Tryon House	May 19, 2014 (#14000223)	8976 N. Seneca St. 43°03′07″N 76°33′38″W	Weedsport	
63	Harriet Tubman Grave	Harriet Tubman Grave	April 2, 1999 (#99000348)	Fort Hill Cemetery; 42°55′29″N 76°34′29″W	Auburn	
64	Harriet Tubman Home for the Aged	Harriet Tubman Home for the Aged	May 30, 1974 (#74001222)	180-182 South St. 42°54′40″N 76°34′04″W	Auburn	
65	Harriet Tubman House	Harriet Tubman House	April 2, 1999 (#99000347)	182 South St. 42°54′40″N 76°33′42″W	Auburn	Part of a National Historic Landmark
66	Tuthill-Green House	Tuthill-Green House	February 24, 1995 (#95000066)	59 S. Main St. 42°42′23″N 76°25′16″W	Moravia	Ornate house built c.1887, with carriage house.
67	Wall Street Methodist Episcopal Church	Wall Street Methodist Episcopal Church	April 29, 1999 (#99000507)	69 Wall St. 42°56′07″N 76°34′43″W	Auburn	
68	West High School	West High School	August 18, 2017 (#100001484)	217 Genesee St. 42°55′34″N 76°34′42″W	Auburn	1938-constructed building for industrial arts-focused high school
69	Peleg and Eunice White House		August 4, 2025 (#100012063)	2297 Dixon Road; 42°43′46″N 76°38′30″W	Ledyard	
70	Willard Memorial Chapel-Welch Memorial Hall	Willard Memorial Chapel-Welch Memorial Hall	June 8, 1989 (#89000461)	17-19 Nelson St. 42°56′14″N 76°33′48″W	Auburn	
71	Dr. Sylvester Willard Mansion	Dr. Sylvester Willard Mansion	November 13, 1989 (#89001948)	203 W. Genesee St. 42°55′39″N 76°34′30″W	Auburn	
72	Jethro Wood House	Jethro Wood House	October 15, 1966 (#66000505)	NY 34B; 42°44′15″N 76°37′57″W	Poplar Ridge	Home of inventor of iron plow
73	Peter Yawger House	Peter Yawger House	April 15, 2004 (#04000283)	NY 90; 42°53′25″N 76°42′25″W	North of Union Springs	Spectacular Greek Revival-style house on NY-90.

== Former listing ==
	Name on the Register	Image	Date listed	Date removed	Location	City or town	Description
1	Flatiron Building		March 5, 1970 (#70000419)	July 18, 1978	1-3 Genesee St.	Auburn	Demolished on January 1, 1975.

== See also ==
- National Register of Historic Places listings in New York
