= Sager House (disambiguation) =

Sager House is the official residence of the Prime Minister of Sweden, in Stockholm.

Sager House may also refer to:

- Simon Sager Cabin, Siloam Springs, Arkansas, listed on the U.S. National Register of Historic Places (NRHP)
- Sager House (Moravia, New York), also NRHP-listed
