= Wall Street Methodist Episcopal Church =

Historic church in New York, United States

- U.S. National Register of Historic Places
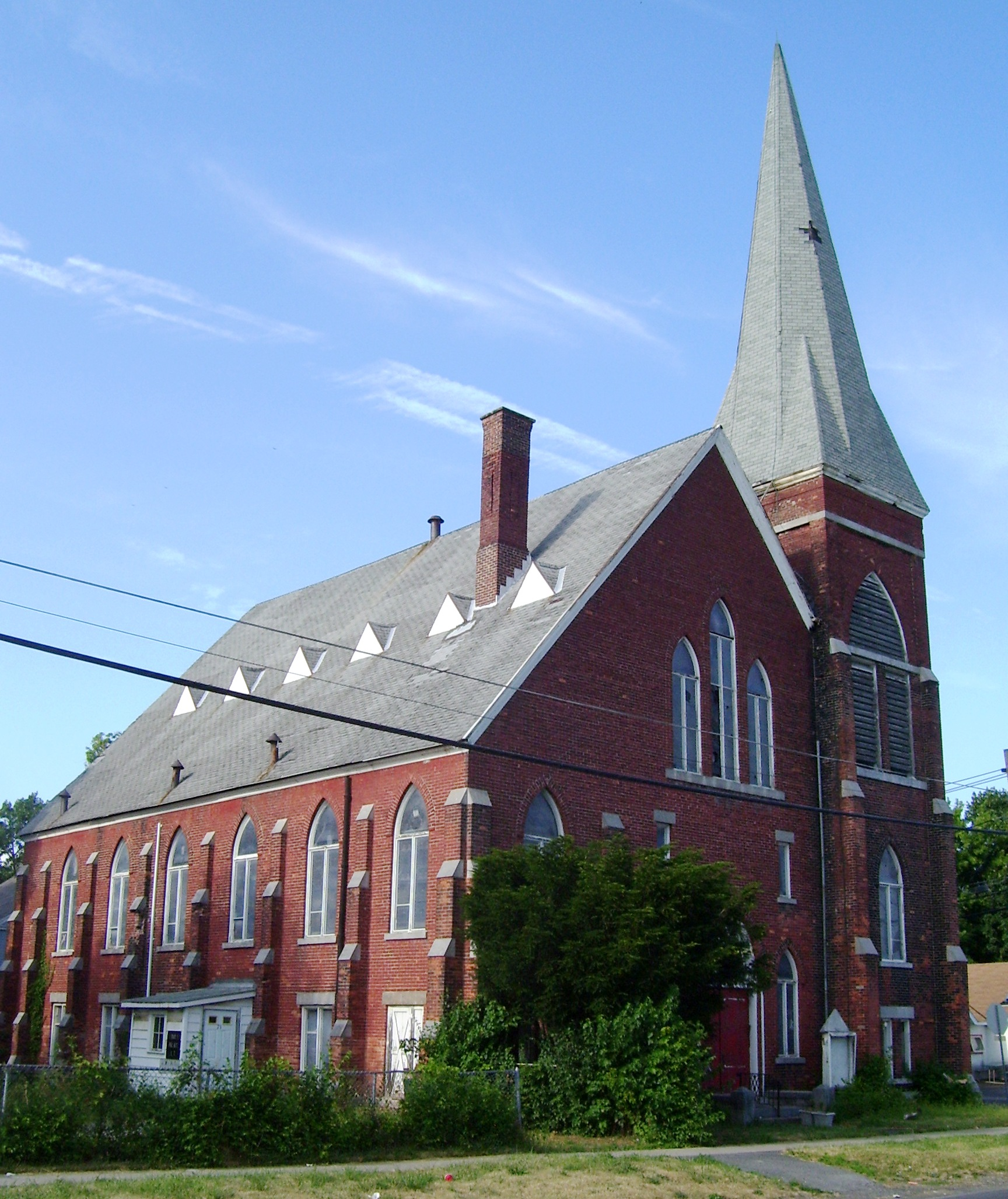
- (2012)

- Location within New York Location within the United States
- Location: 69 Wall St., Auburn, New York
- Coordinates: 42°56′7″N 76°34′43″W
- Built: 1788, 1887 (renovated)
- Architectural style: Gothic Revival
- Demolished: June 2021
- NRHP reference No.: 99000507
- Added to NRHP: April 29, 1999

Wall Street Methodist Episcopal Church, formerly the home of the African Methodist Episcopal Zion Church, was a historic Methodist Episcopal church located at 69 Wall Street in Auburn, New York, United States. It was a large Gothic Revival style brick and limestone structure built in 1788, and renovated in the 1887. Following years of neglect, it was damaged in a windstorm in the summer of 2021 and demolished. The facade was dominated by a square tower topped by a broach spire. It was an example of an auditorium plan church, popular in church design from the 1880s to 1920s.

The church was listed on the National Register of Historic Places in 1999.

== See also ==
- National Register of Historic Places listings in Cayuga County, New York
