= House at 21 West Cayuga Street =

Historic house in New York, United States

- U.S. National Register of Historic Places
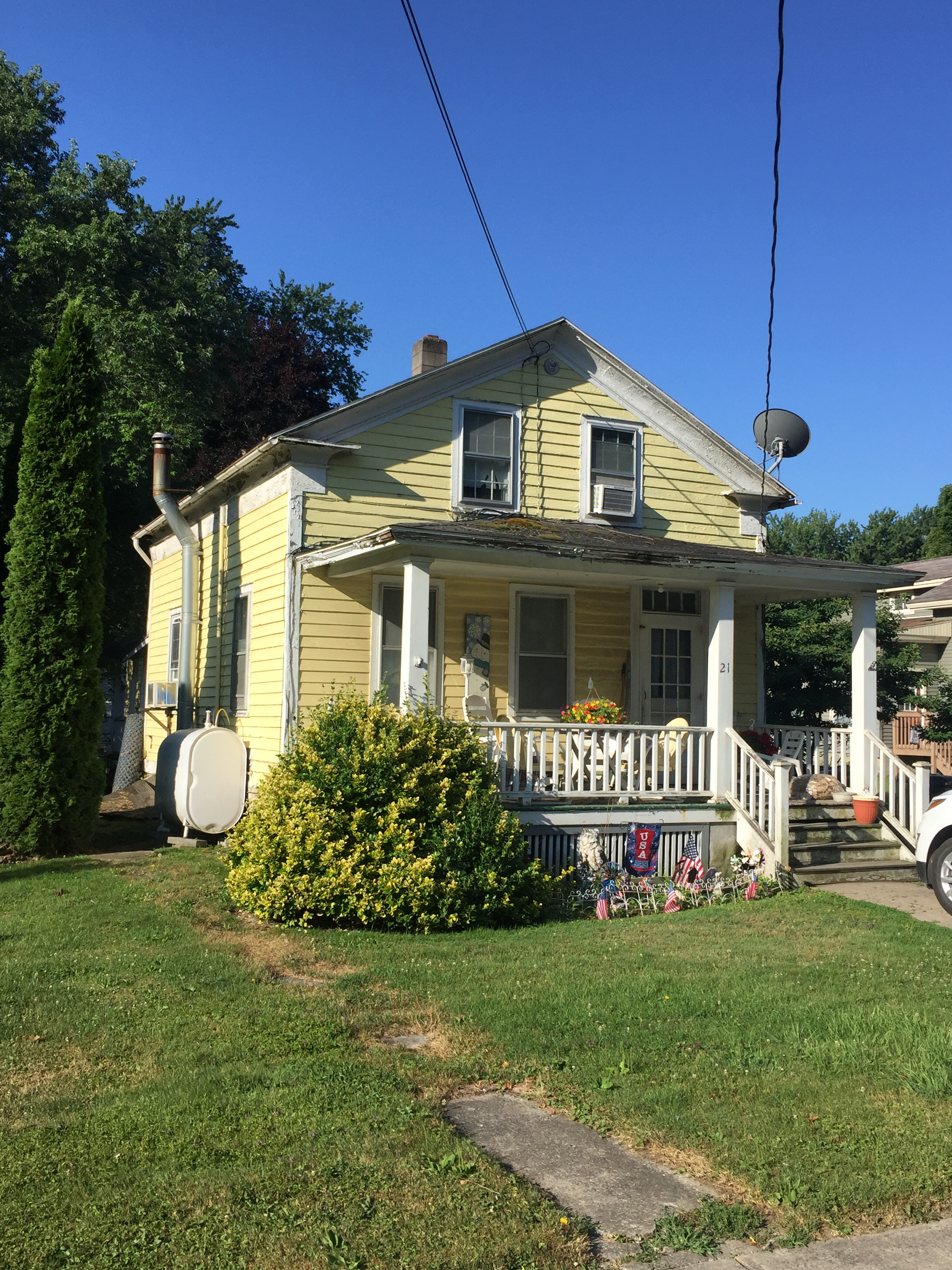

- Location within New York Location within the United States
- Location: 21 W. Cayuga St., Moravia, New York
- Coordinates: 42.71351°N 76.42384°W
- Area: less than one acre
- Architectural style: Federal
- MPS: Moravia MPS
- NRHP reference No.: 95000103
- Added to NRHP: February 24, 1995

The House at 21 West Cayuga Street in the village of Moravia in Cayuga County, New York is a historic home. It is a 1 1/2-story, frame dwelling with a 1-story rear wing. It was probably constructed between 1810 and 1830 as a vernacular interpretation of Federal style residential architecture.

It was listed on the National Register of Historic Places in 1995.
