= House at 37 West Cayuga Street =

Historic house in New York, United States

- U.S. National Register of Historic Places
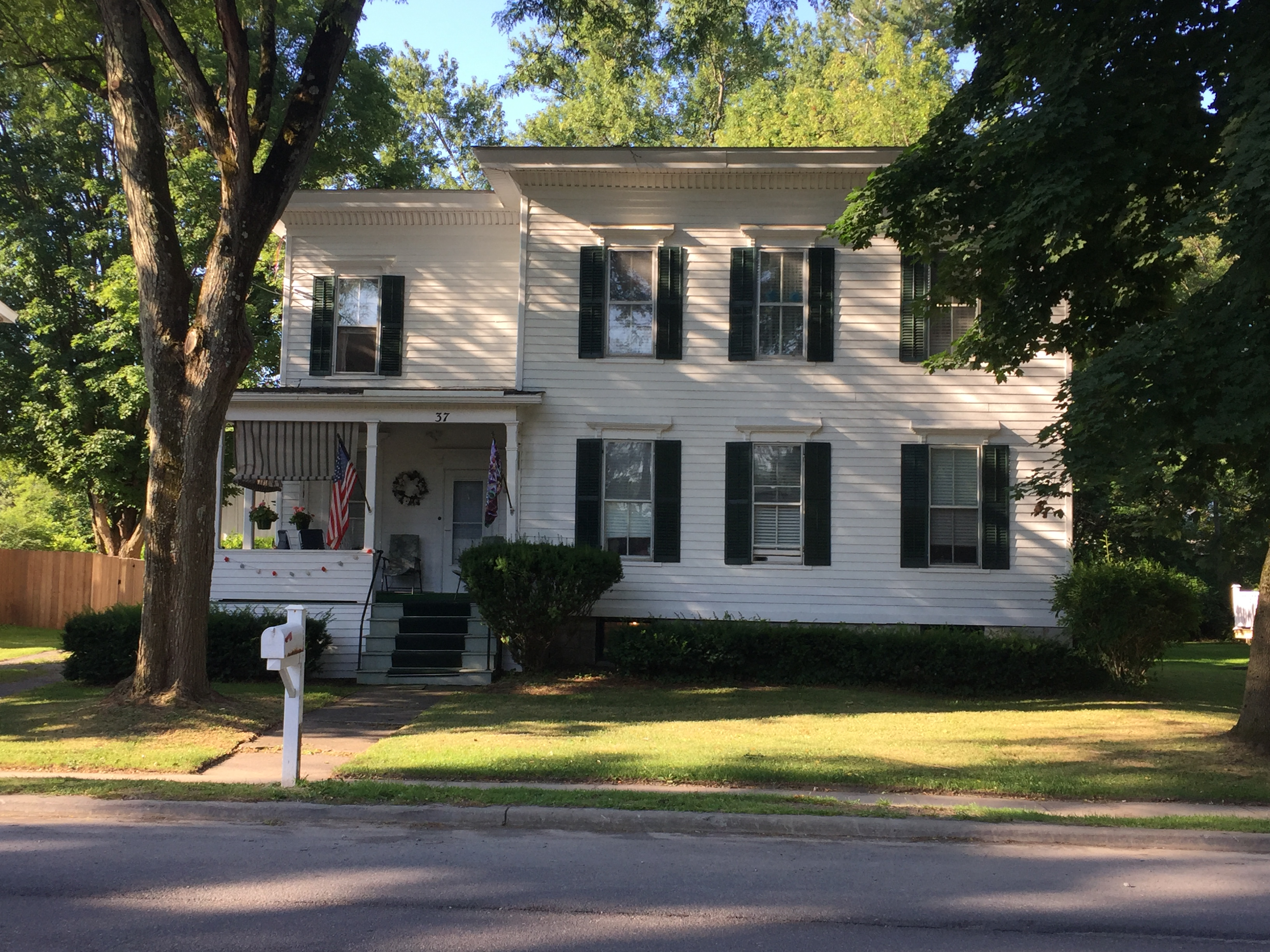
- House in 2022

- Location within New York Location within the United States
- Location: 37 W. Cayuga St., Moravia, New York
- Coordinates: 42°42′50″N 76°25′36″W
- Area: less than one acre
- Architectural style: Italianate
- MPS: Moravia MPS
- NRHP reference No.: 95000063
- Added to NRHP: February 24, 1995

The House at 37 West Cayuga Street in the village of Moravia in Cayuga County, New York is a historic home. It is a two-story, frame, Italianate style residence. The property contains the house, built about 1880, and a board and batten carriage house, probably built about 1870.

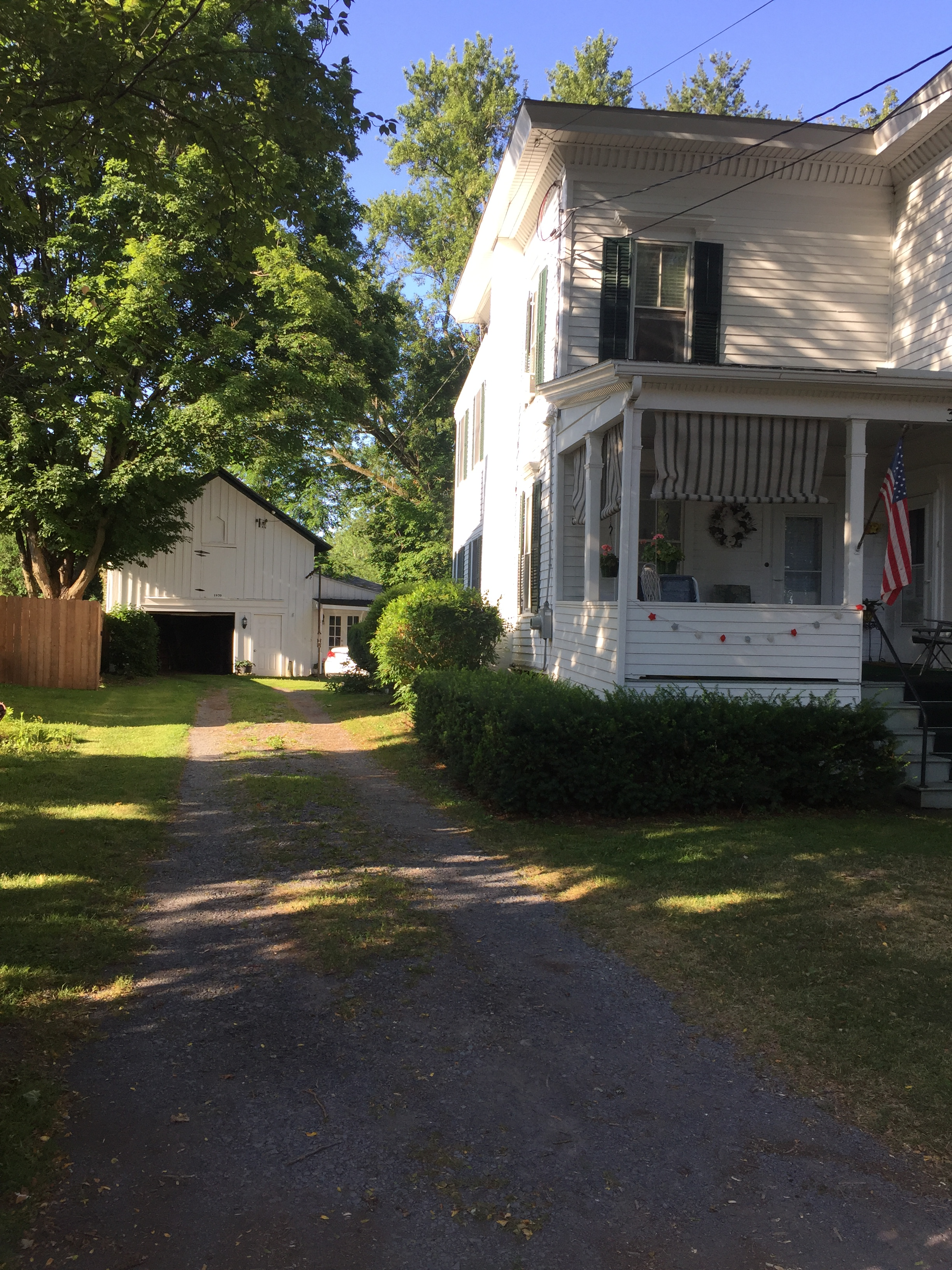
Carriage house behind

It was listed on the National Register of Historic Places in 1995.
