= House at 17 Aurora Street =

Historic house in New York, United States

- U.S. National Register of Historic Places
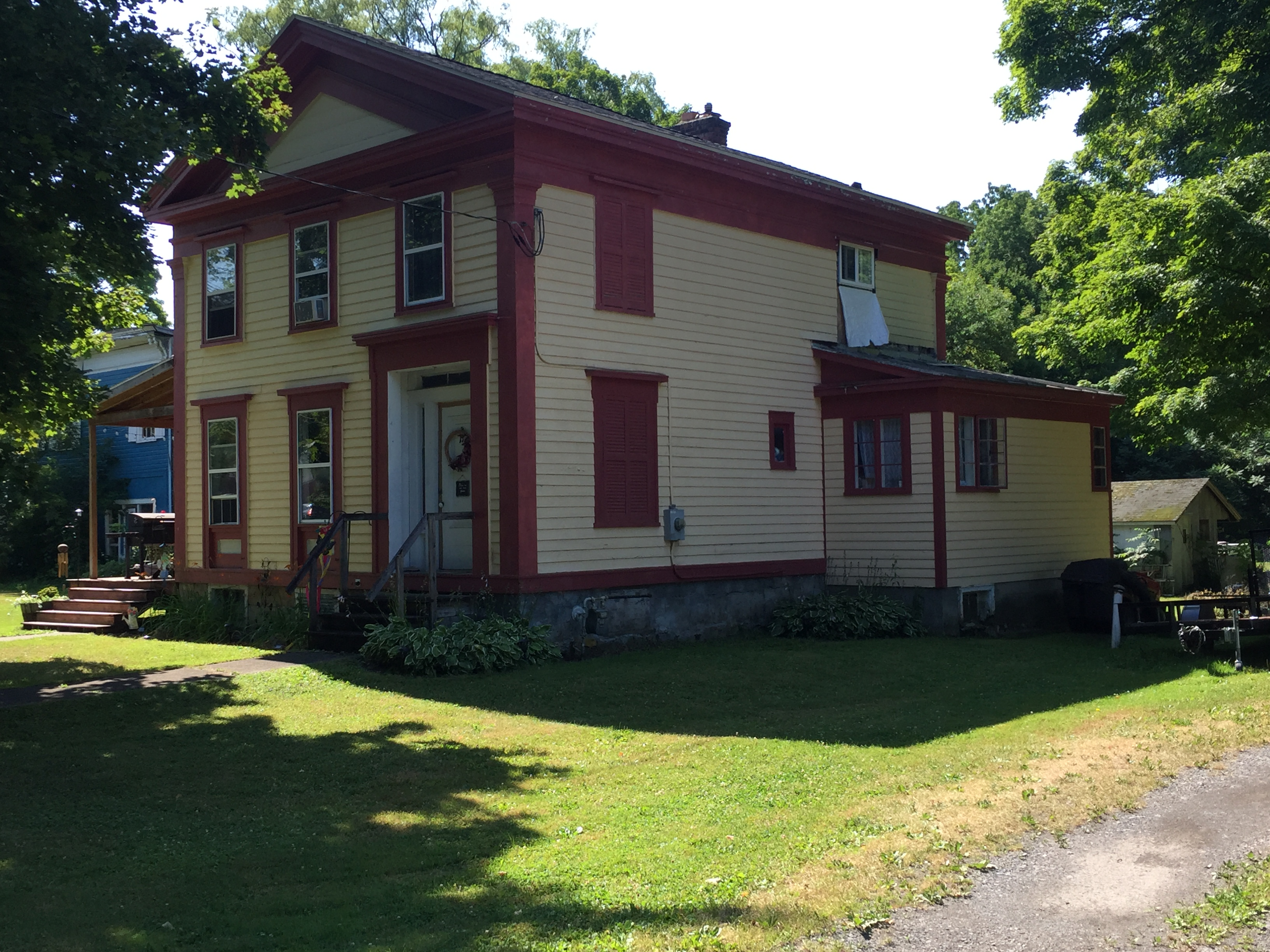

- Location within New York Location within the United States
- Location: 17 Aurora St., Moravia, New York
- Coordinates: 42.71037°N 76.42288°W
- Area: less than one acre
- Built: c. 1850
- Architectural style: Greek Revival
- MPS: Moravia MPS
- NRHP reference No.: 95000057
- Added to NRHP: February 24, 1995

The House at 17 Aurora Street in the village of Moravia, Cayuga County, New York, is listed on the National Register of Historic Places.

== Description and history ==
It is a two-story, frame Greek Revival style dwelling, constructed in about 1850. The structure features a full front pediment, corner pilasters, shouldered architraves, and transom and sidelights around the front door.

It was listed on the National Register of Historic Places on February 24, 1995.
