= House at 15 East Cayuga Street =

Historic house in New York, United States

- U.S. National Register of Historic Places
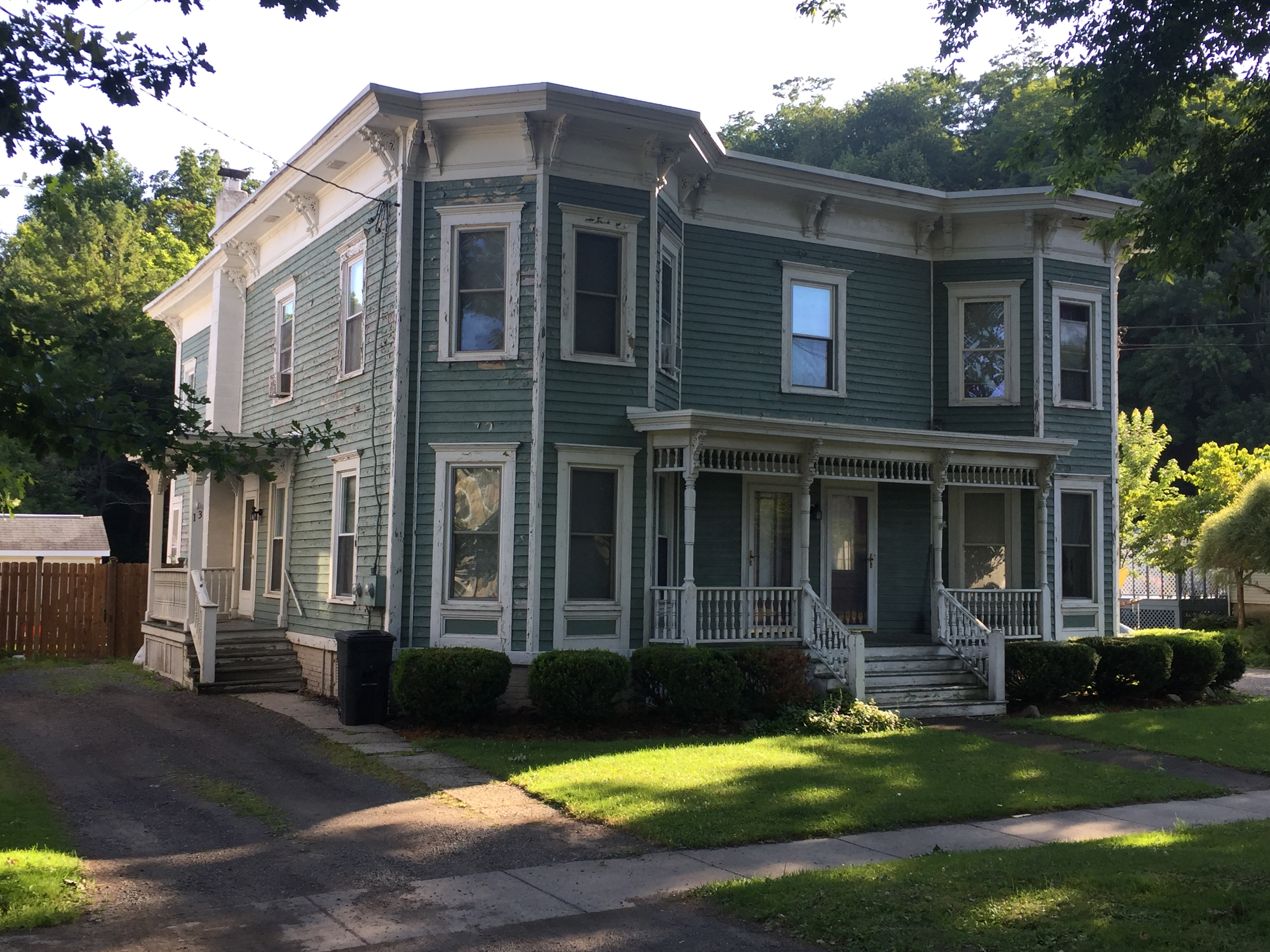
- House in 2022

- Location within New York Location within the United States
- Location: 15 E. Cayuga St., Moravia, New York
- Coordinates: 42°42′49″N 76°25′15″W
- Area: less than one acre
- Built: 1900
- Architectural style: Italianate
- MPS: Moravia MPS
- NRHP reference No.: 95000472
- Added to NRHP: April 20, 1995

House at 15 East Cayuga Street in the village of Moravia, Cayuga County, New York, is a historic house that is listed on the National Register of Historic Places.

== Description and history ==
It is a two-story, frame Italianate style double residence. It was definitely built before 1887, and perhaps even before 1859. It was modified to its present appearance sometime between 1898 and 1908. The front features two 2-story, semi-octagonal bay windows.

Deemed significant architecturally "as the most intact historic duplex in Moravia" and as "an intact and representative example of Italianate style residential architecture in Moravia associated with the village's post-Civil War prosperity."

It was listed on the National Register on April 20, 1995.
