= House at 31 West Cayuga Street =

Historic house in New York, United States

- U.S. National Register of Historic Places
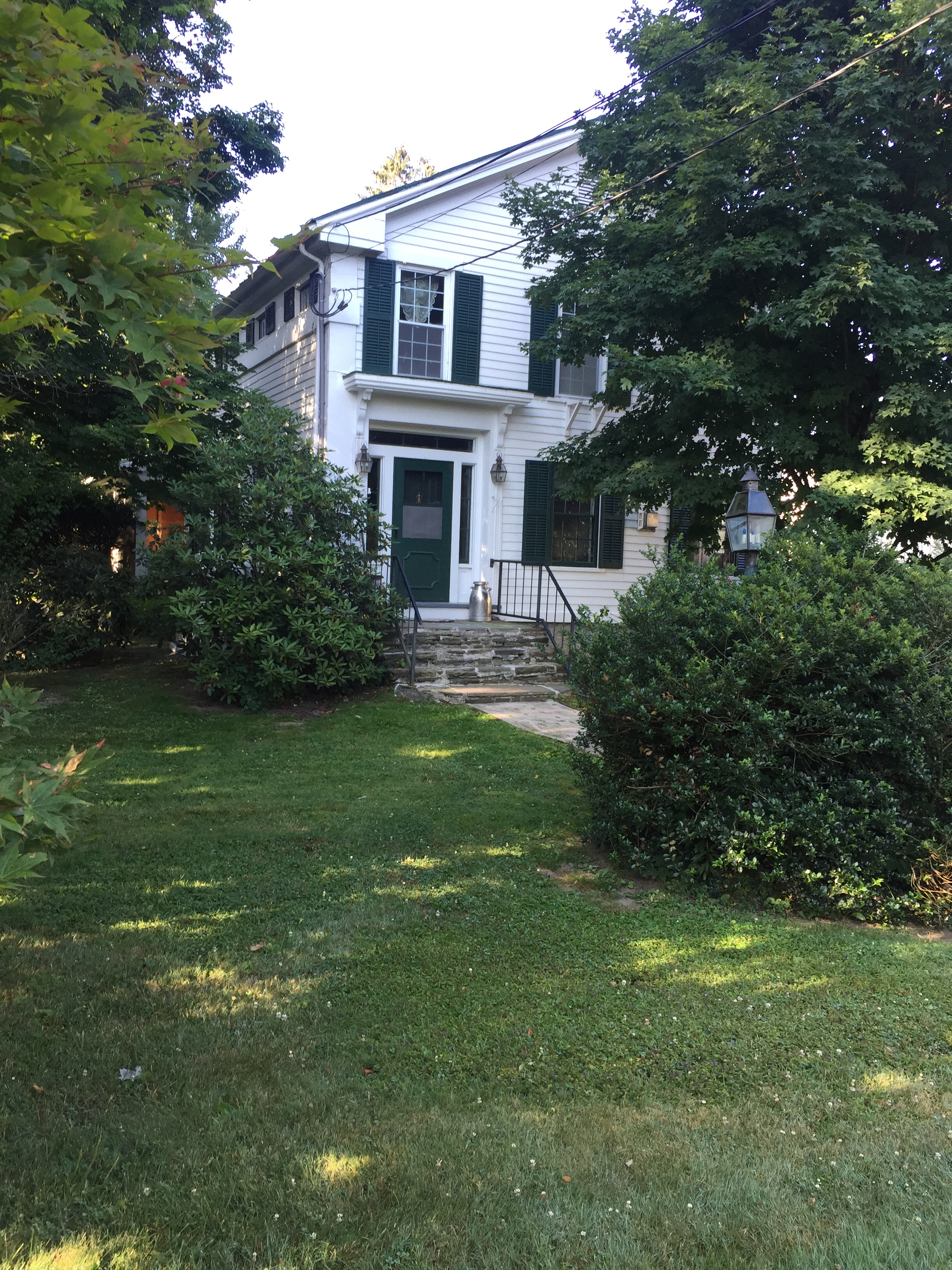

- Location within New York Location within the United States
- Location: 31 W. Cayuga, Moravia, New York
- Coordinates: 42.71362°N 76.42524°W
- Area: less than one acre
- Architectural style: Greek Revival
- MPS: Moravia MPS
- NRHP reference No.: 95000062
- Added to NRHP: February 24, 1995

The House at 31 West Cayuga Street in the village of Moravia in Cayuga County, New York is a historic home. It is a 2-story, frame, Greek Revival-style dwelling with a 1 1/2-story rear wing. It was built about 1840.

It was listed on the National Register of Historic Places in 1995.
