= House at 20 Aurora Street =

Historic house in New York, United States

- U.S. National Register of Historic Places
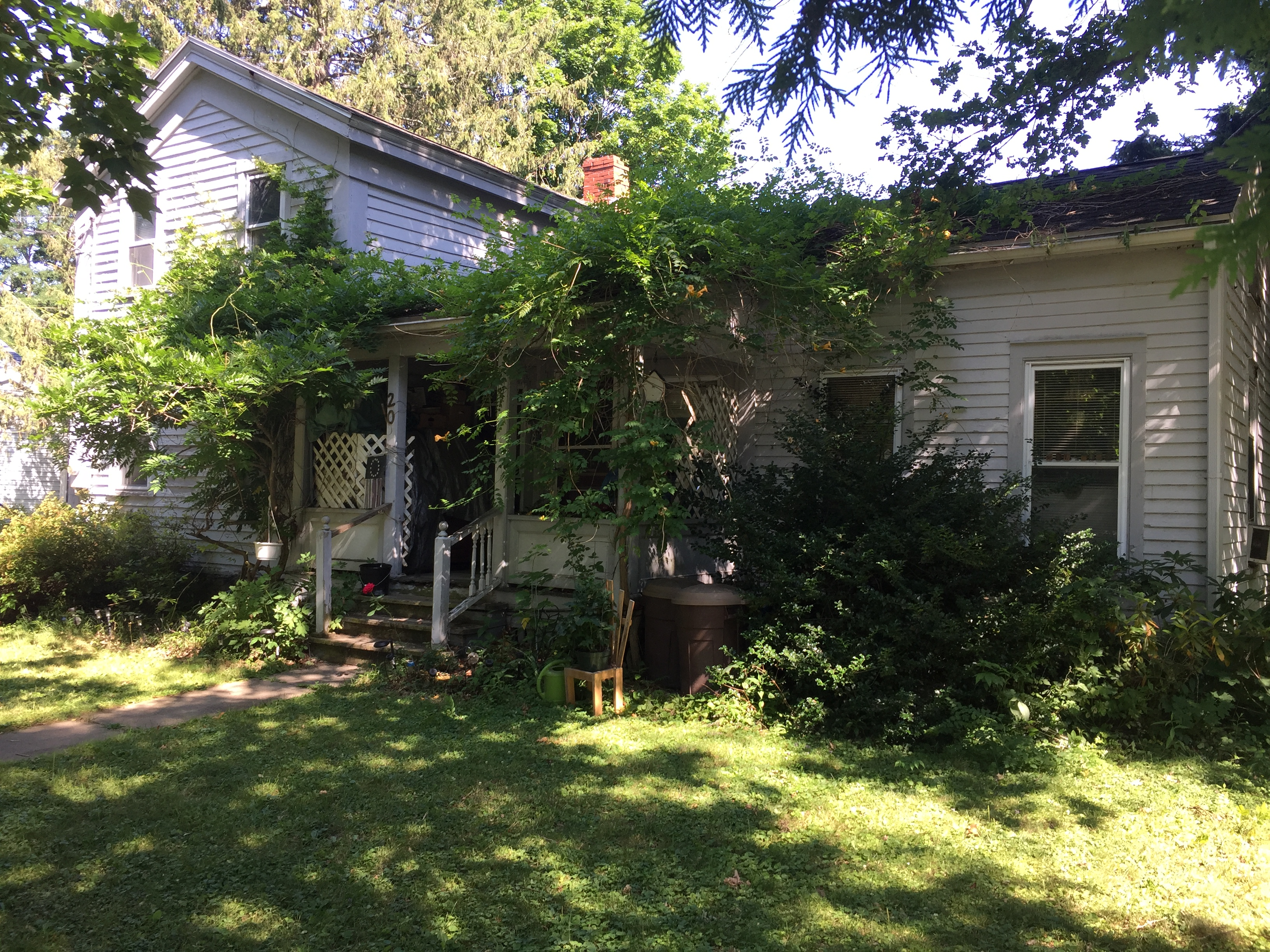

- Location within New York Location within the United States
- Location: 20 Aurora St., Moravia, New York
- Coordinates: 42.71076°N 76.42323°W
- Area: less than one acre
- Architectural style: Greek Revival
- MPS: Moravia MPS
- NRHP reference No.: 95000059
- Added to NRHP: February 24, 1995

The House at 20 Aurora Street in the village of Moravia in Cayuga County, New York is a historic house listed on the National Register of Historic Places. It is a two-story, vernacular frame dwelling constructed about 1840, with an extension to the ell added about 1860. Also on the property is a two-story Greek Revival style carriage house probably added about 1850.

It was listed on the National Register in 1995.
