= North Main Street Historic District (Moravia, New York) =

Historic district in New York, United States

- U.S. National Register of Historic Places
- U.S. Historic district
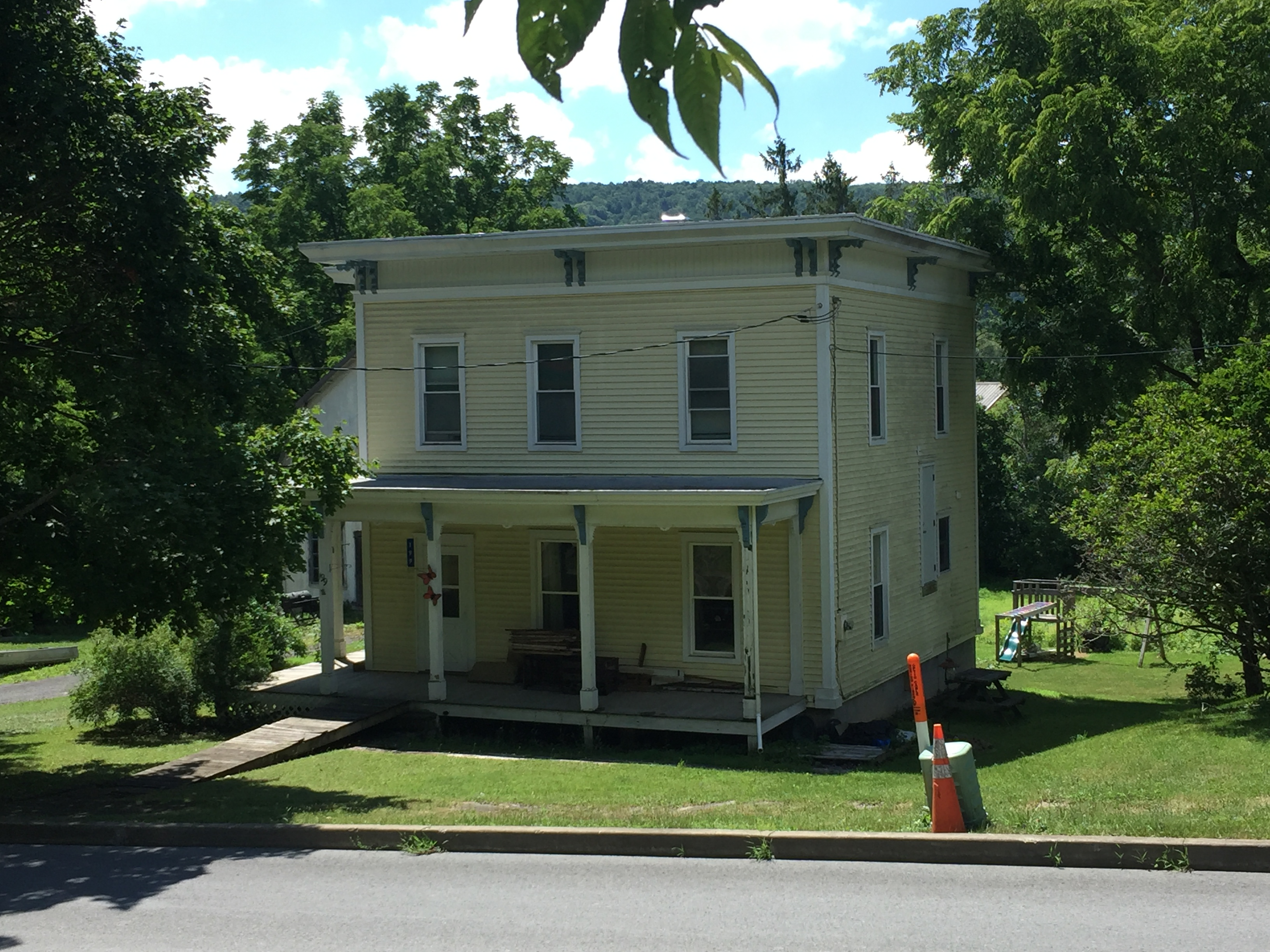
- Italianate house at 199 N. Main St. (previously 35 N. Main St.), showing wide eaves supported by brackets, but not rounded tops of windows

- Location within New York Location within the United States
- Location: N. Main St. and part of Keeler Ave., Moravia, New York
- Coordinates: 42°42′54″N 76°25′19″W
- Area: 13 acres (5.3 ha)
- Architectural style: Italianate, Greek Revival, Queen Anne
- MPS: Moravia MPS
- NRHP reference No.: 92001365
- Added to NRHP: February 3, 1993

The North Main Street Historic District in the village of Moravia, New York is a national historic district which was listed on the National Register of Historic Places in 1993. The district contains one contributing object and 44 contributing buildings. The majority of the buildings were built between 1870 and 1890 and display the features associated with Italianate style architecture. Italianate architecture in the United States is characterized by use of wide, even "emphatic", eaves supported by paired or single brackets (which seem to have designs unique to each building), low-pitched or flat roofs often not visible from the ground, and often cupolas or towers, as if the architecture were for a hilltop villa in Italian countryside, while in fact in the U.S. being sometimes upon a hilltop in the country but more often in town/city environments. Another characteristic is usage of round-topped windows.

The district was listed on the National Register of Historic Places in 1993.

The district can be said to start with the "Brick Store" building at the northwest corner of Cayuga St. and N. Main St., built c.1830, which was numbered 1 North Main Street at date of NRHP listing, and then to run north along the west (odd-numbered) side of N. Main St. to the house which was numbered 37 N. Main St. (and which is now numbered 203 N. Main St.). On the west, even-numbered side of the street, it included houses running from number 10 (per map included in NRHP document) to number 36 (now 202 N. Main St.). And it included three properties at 5, 6, and 8 Keeler St., a cross street. The properties along Main St., like others in Moravia outside the district, have since been renumbered, with, for example, the house at 28 N. Main St. now being 192 Main St.

It includes Italianate, Greek Revival, and Queen Anne architecture.

== Odd side ==
Selected buildings included are:

=== 5 Keeler ===
5 Keeler, in photo 1

=== 6 Keeler ===
6 keeler, in photo 2

== Store ==
1 N Main St., in photo 3

=== Artemus Cady House in photo 4 ===
Artemus Cady House, at 169 N. Main St., formerly 7 N. Main St., in photo 4. (42.71383°N 76.42208°W is Italianate in style though was originally constructed c.1830 in Federal style.

=== 11 N. Main St., in photo 6 ===
Has round tower with conical top, in photo 6

=== 15 N. Main St., in photo 8 ===
Two-story frame Queen Anne built c.1885. Has "elaborate spindle and pierced-work front porch." With contributing carriage barn.

=== 193 N. Main St., which was ??? ===
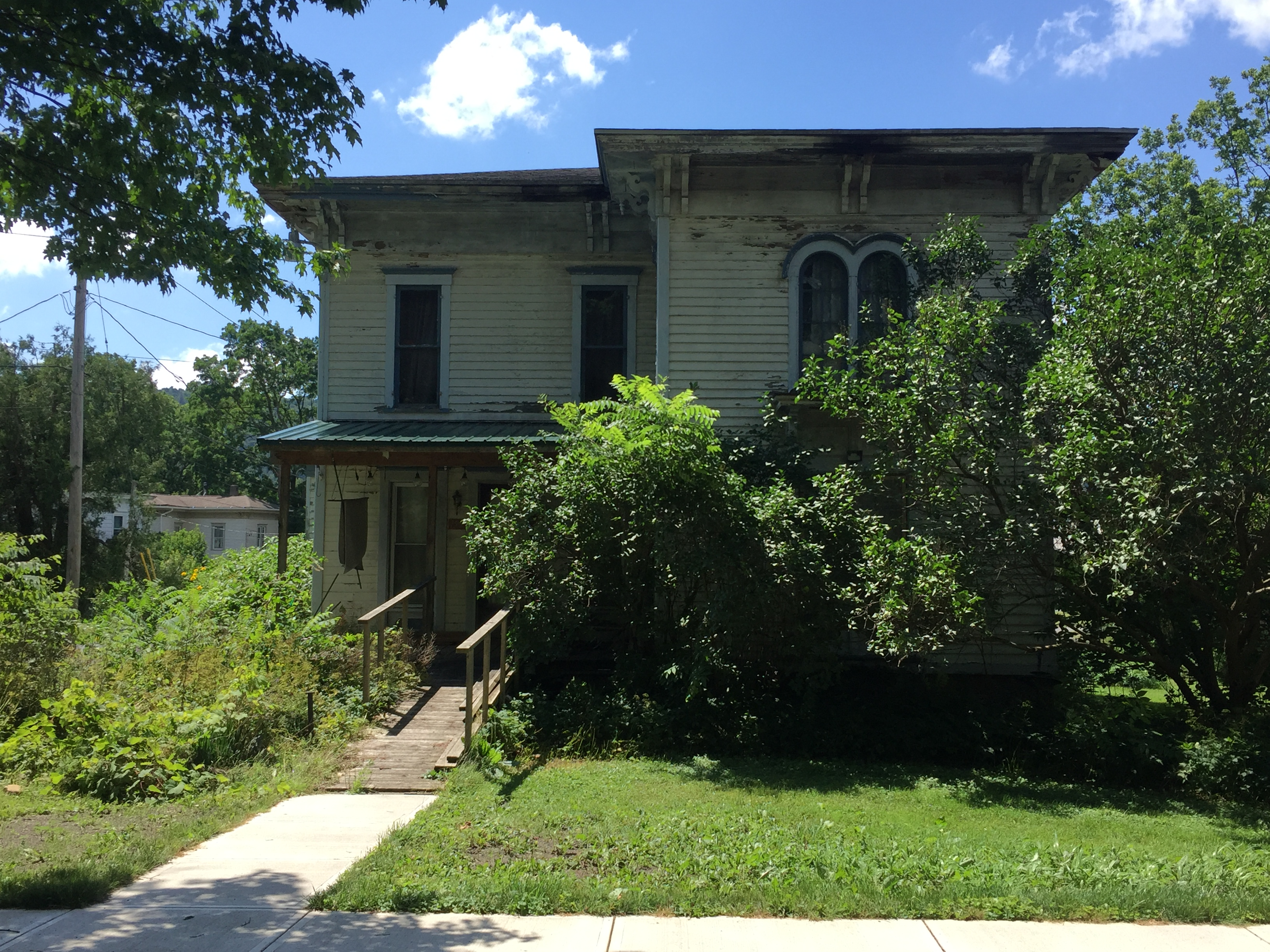

Italianate house at 193 N. Main St., which was??? perhaps 25 N. Main St.? not 21 or 23.

=== 195 N. Main St., which was??? ===
House at 195 N. Main St., which was ???

=== 37 N. Main St. ===
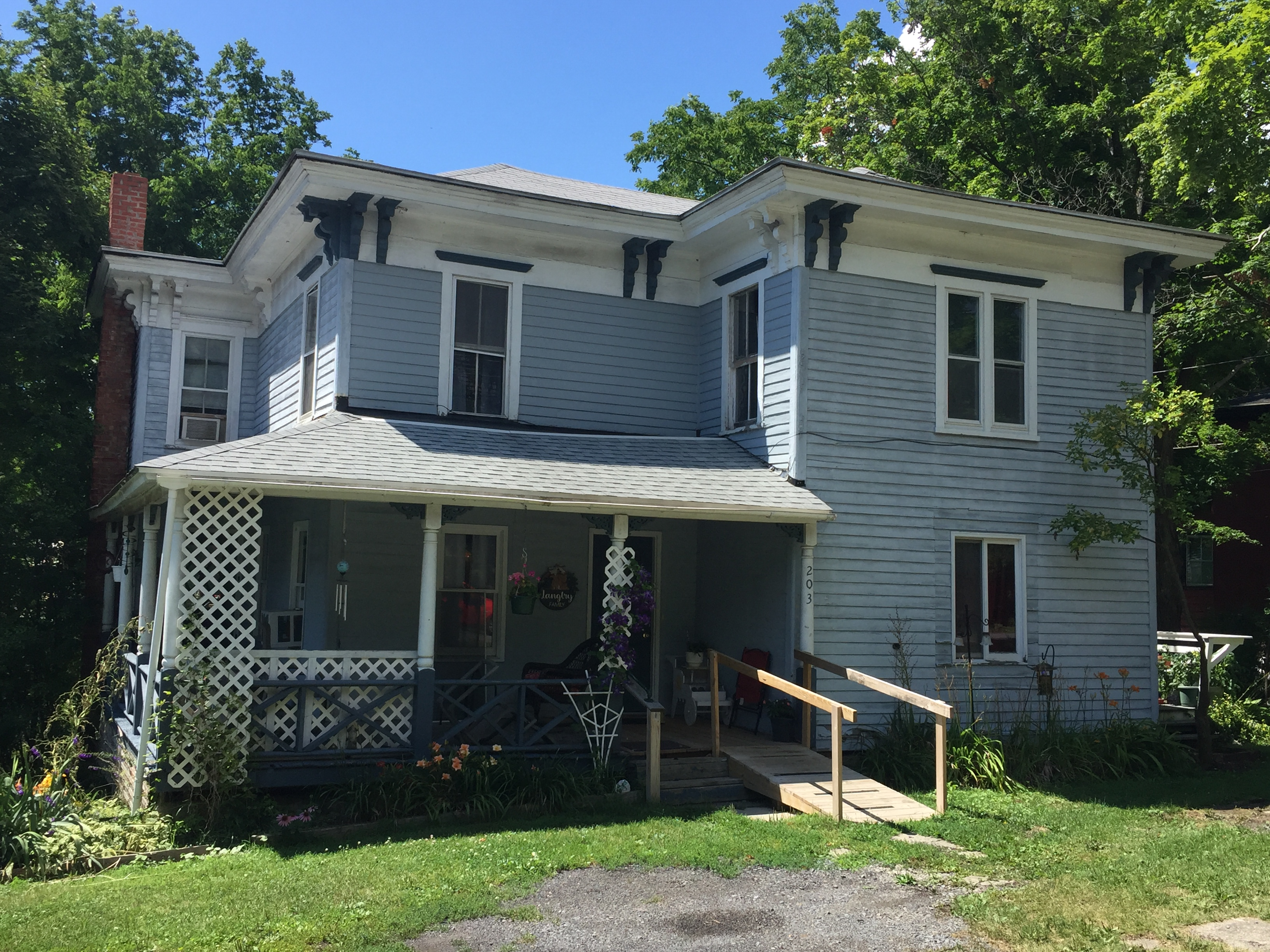

Italianate house at 203 N. Main St. (formerly 37 N. Main St.), built c.1870, with vinyl siding added before NRHP listing. "Elaborate front porch with pierce-work[?] balustrade."

== Even side ==
=== 10 N. Main St. ===
(photo #5 in NRHP doc)

=== 12 N. Main St. ===
(photo #7 in NRHP doc, has circular whatsits between paired brackets)

=== 18 N. Main St. ===
The one that is now an Inn, in photo 9

=== 26 N. Main St. ===
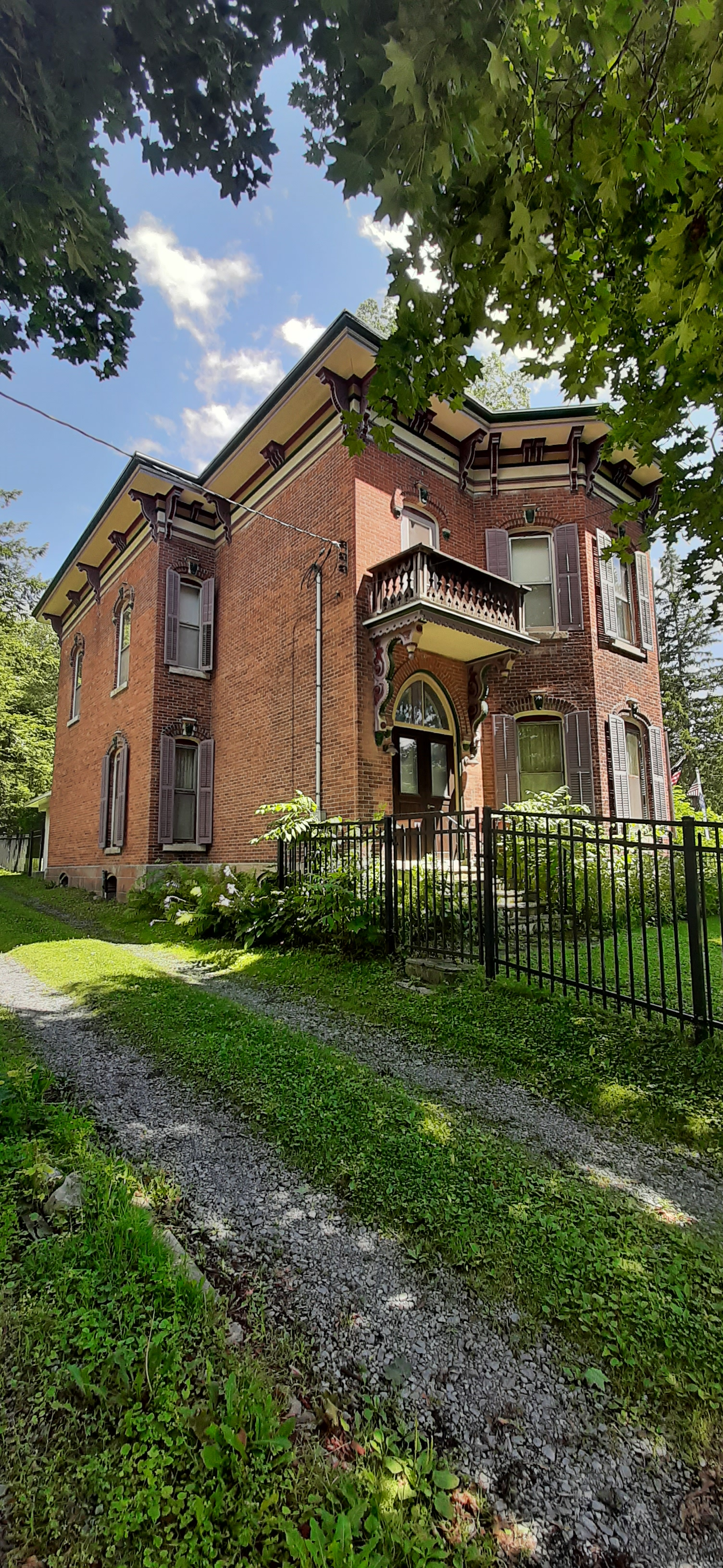

190 N. Main St., formerly 26 N. Main St., [a favorite?]

=== 28 N. Main St. ===
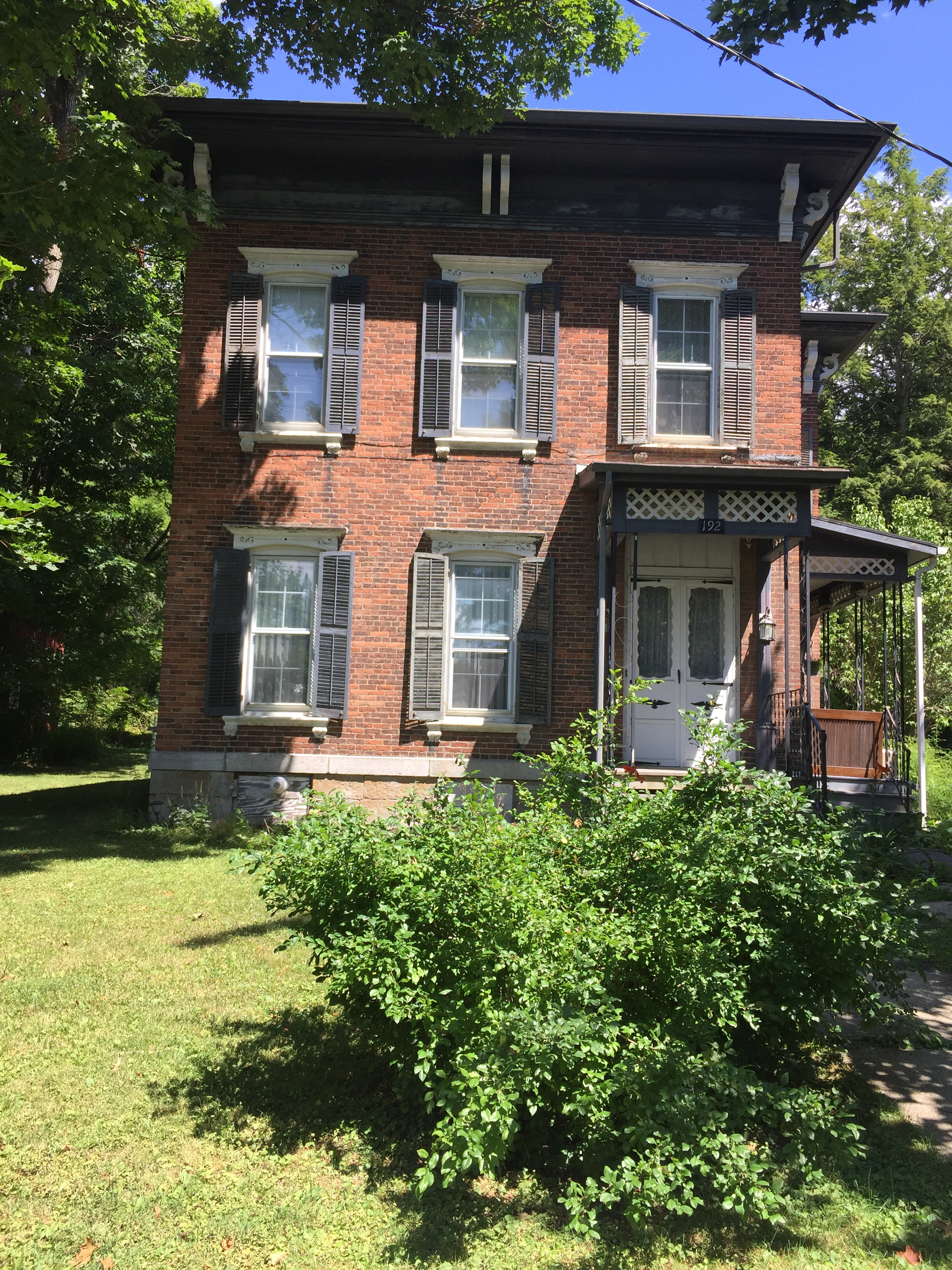

Two-story brick Italianate house built c.1870, with hipped roof, segmental arch windows, and cut stone foundation.

=== 30 N. Main St. ===
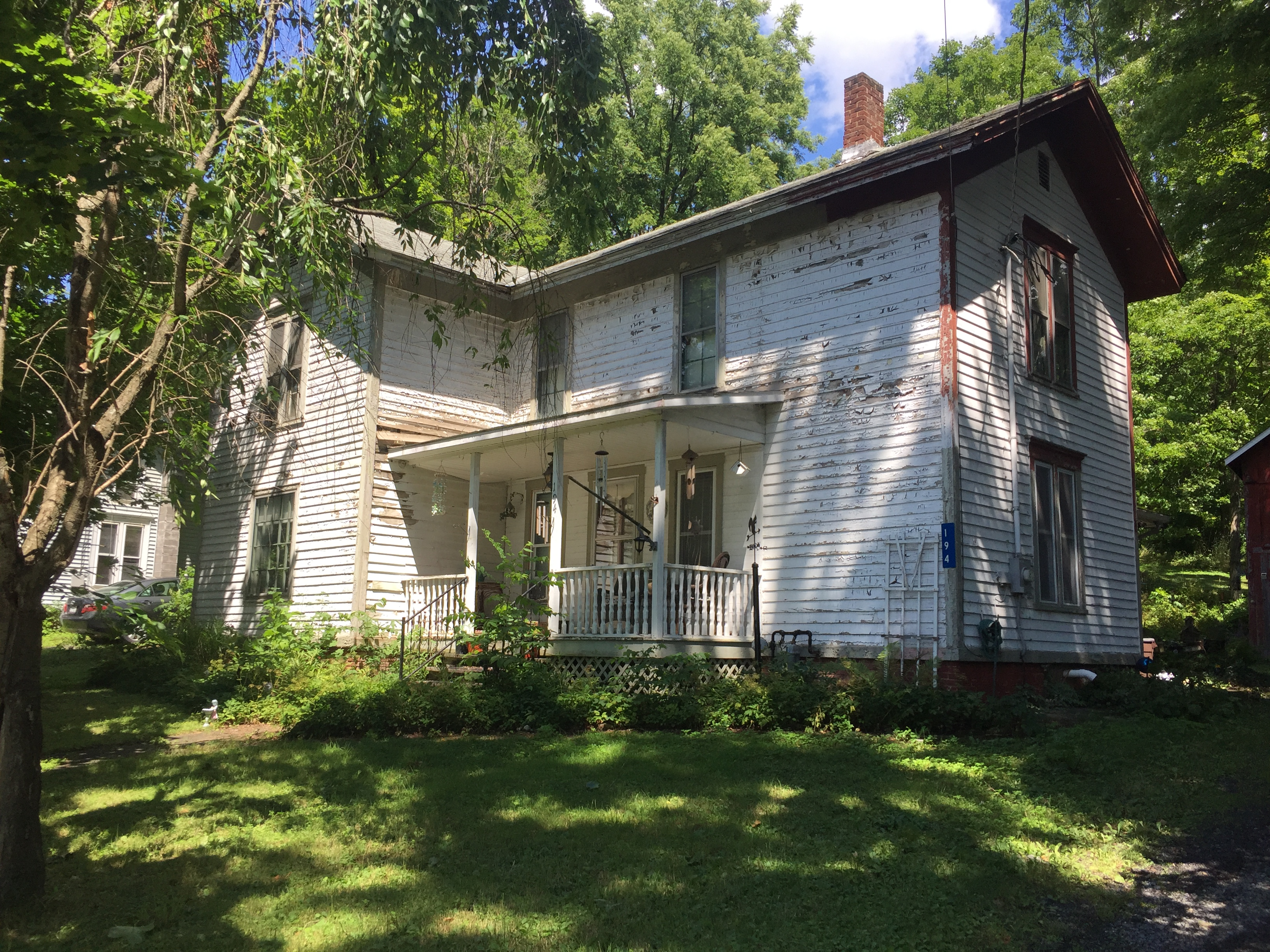

Frame Italianate house with clapboard exterior, built c.1870., at 194 N. Main St., formerly 30 N. Main St.

=== 32 N. Main St. ===
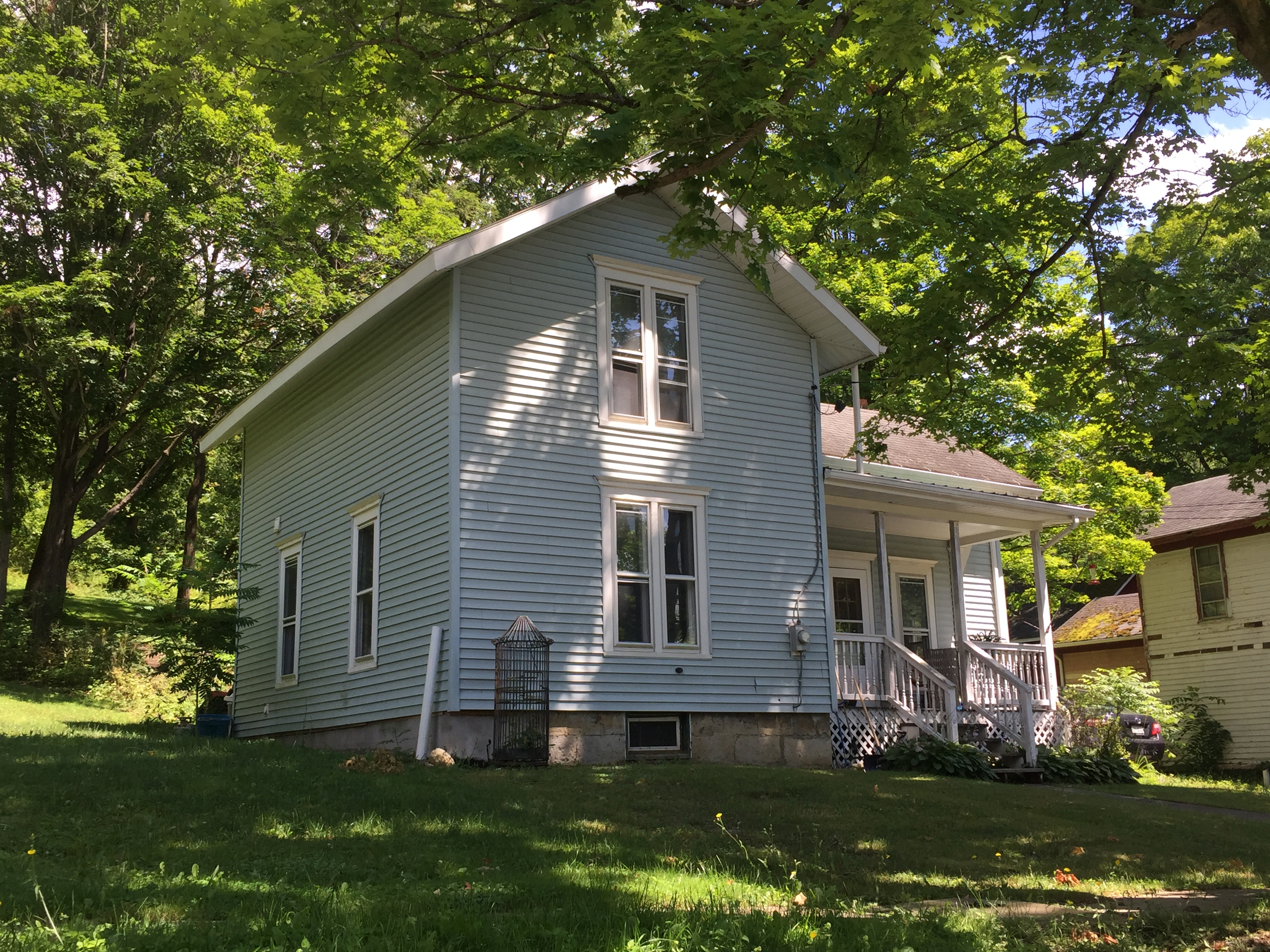

House at 196 N. Main St., formerly 32 N. Main St., built c.1870, considered to be a frame Italianate cottage.

=== 34 N. Main St. ===
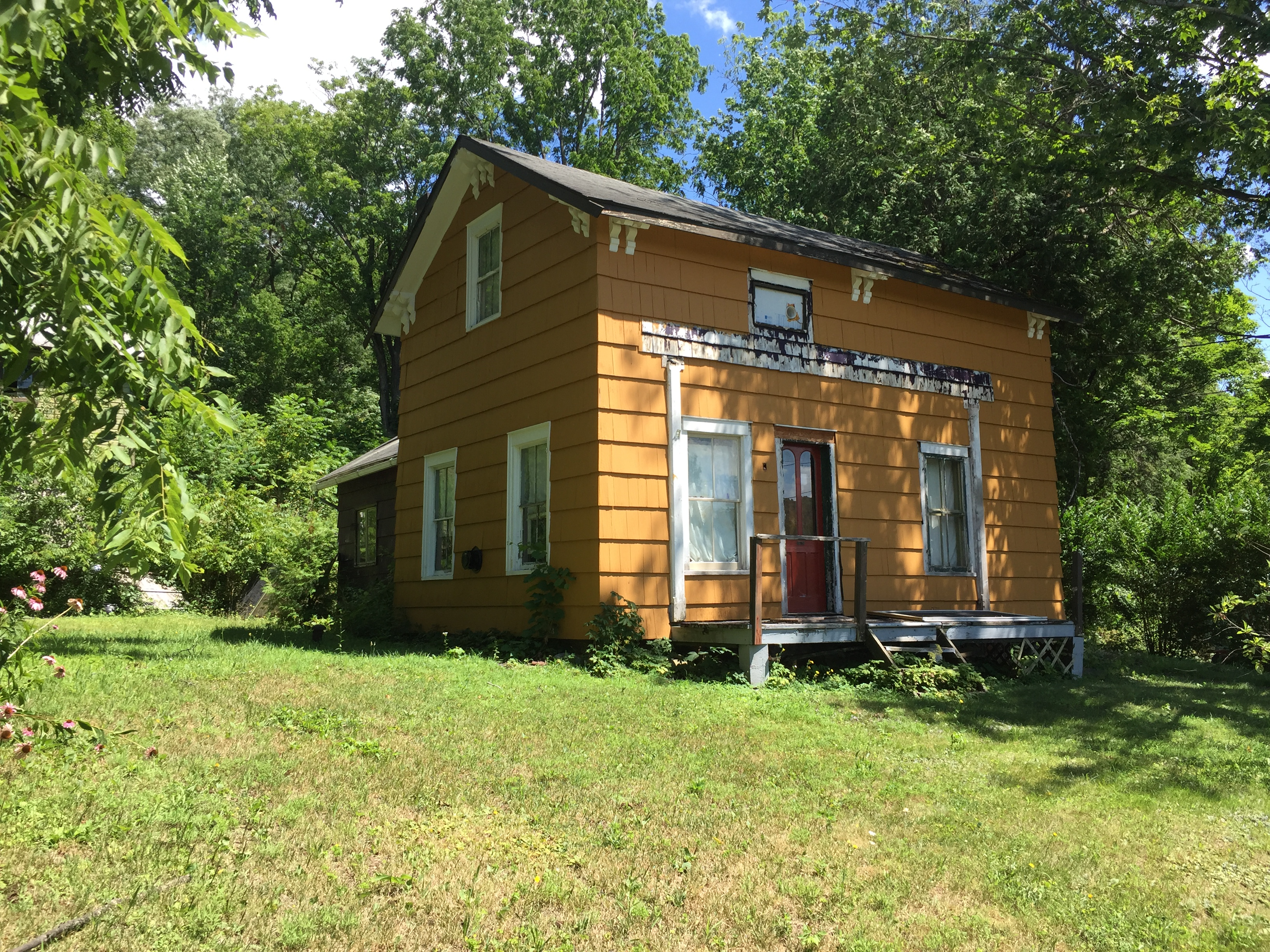

One-and-a-half-story frame cottage with bracketed cornice. Formerly 34 N. Main St., now 198 N. Main St. Has contributing carriage barn behind.

=== 36 N. Main St. ===
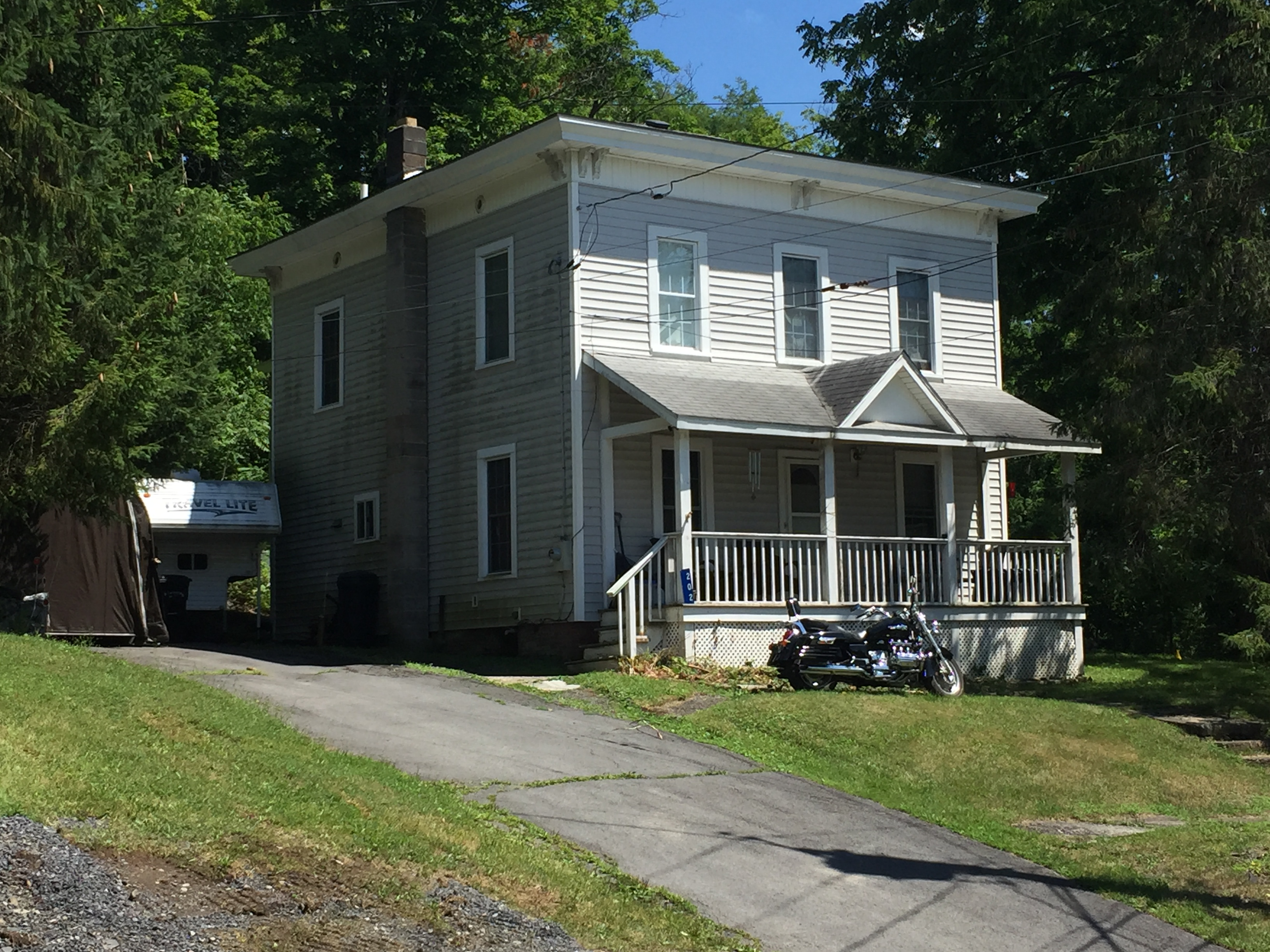

House at 202 N. Main St., formerly 36 N. Main St., is a frame Italianate house with vinyl siding before date of NRHP listing.

The historic district boundaries now includes some newer structures. A small house, possibly a single-wide, at what is now 201 N. Main St., in between what were 35 and 37 N. Main St., is apparently an infill built after the historic district listing.
