= House at 46 South Main Street =

Historic house in New York, United States

- U.S. National Register of Historic Places
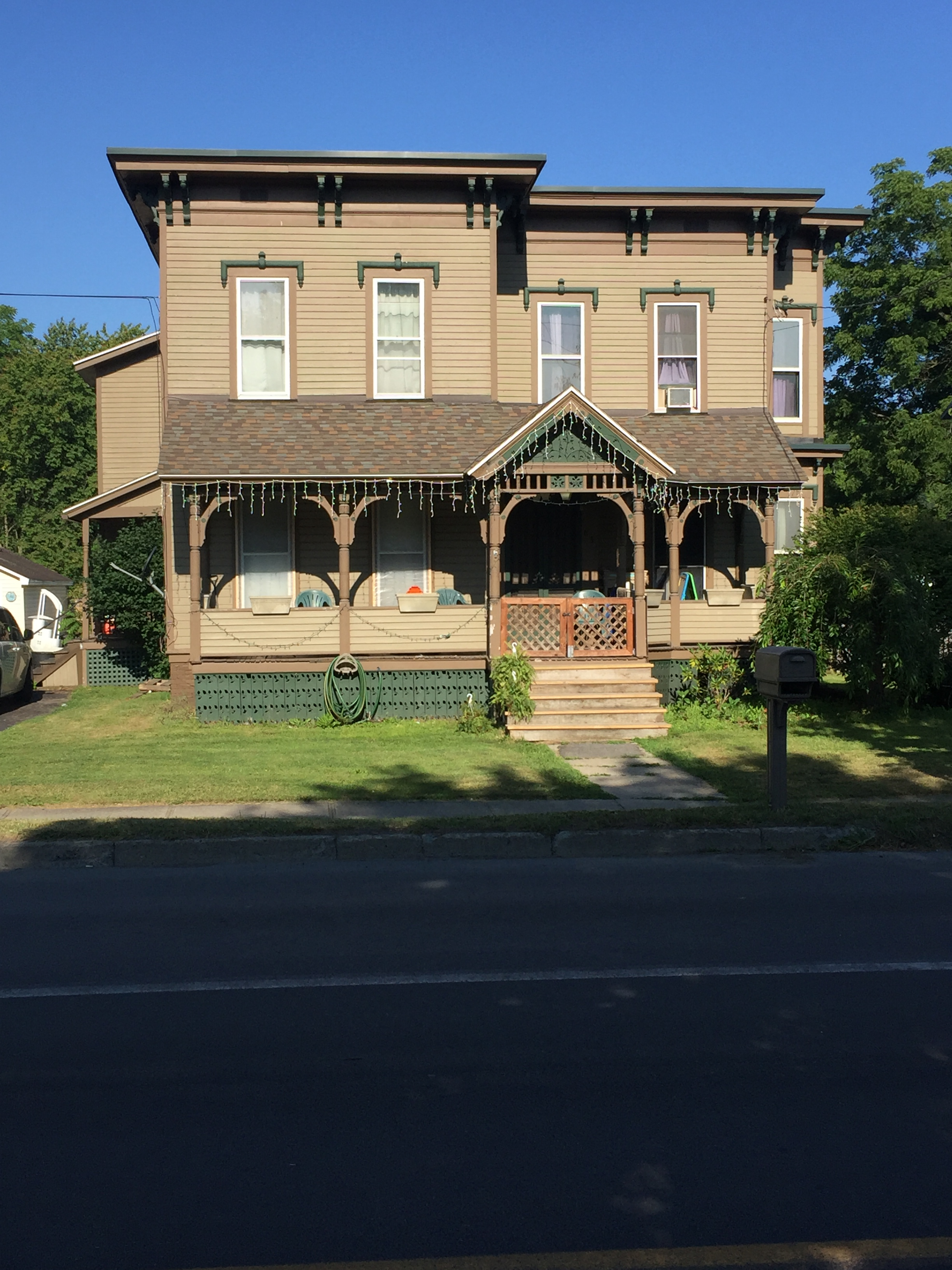

- Location within New York Location within the United States
- Location: 63 S. Main St., Moravia, New York
- Coordinates: 42.70700°N 76.42118°W
- Area: less than one acre
- Architectural style: Italianate
- MPS: Moravia MPS
- NRHP reference No.: 95000065
- Added to NRHP: February 24, 1995

House at 46 South Main Street is a historic home located actually at 63 South Main St. in the village Moravia in Cayuga County, New York. It is listed on the National Register of Historic Places, however, as "House at 46 South Main Street"; the street numbering was changed since).

It is a two-story, frame, Italianate style residence. The house appears to have been built between 1884 and 1887.

It was listed on the National Register in 1995.
