= East Genoa Methodist Episcopal Church =

Historic church in New York, United States

- U.S. National Register of Historic Places
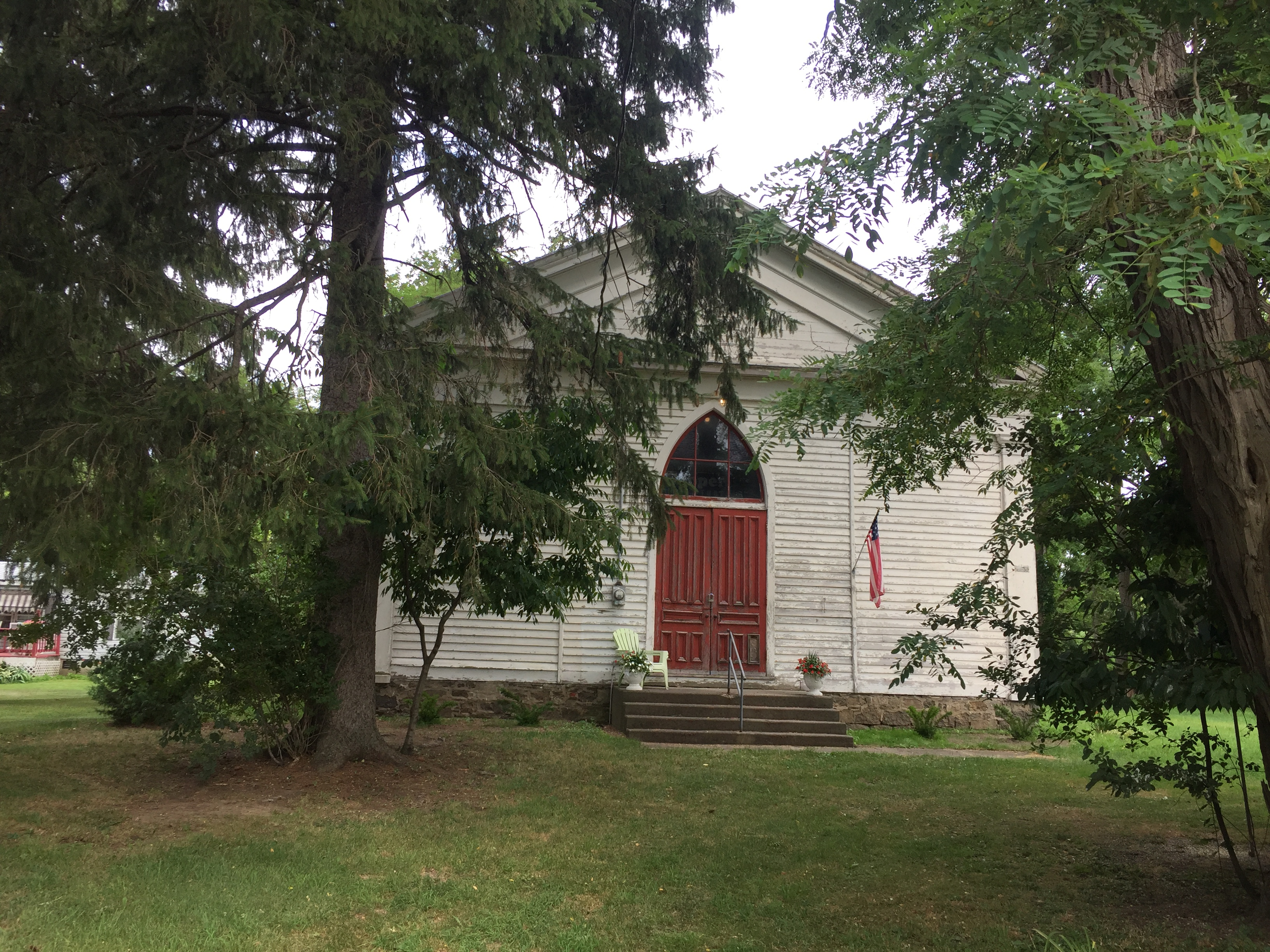

- Location within New York Location within the United States
- Location: 558 E. Genoa Rd., Genoa, New York
- Coordinates: 42°38′44″N 76°30′19″W
- Area: less than one acre
- Built: 1849
- Architect: Snyder, Jeremiah
- Architectural style: Greek Revival, Gothic
- NRHP reference No.: 01001500
- Added to NRHP: January 24, 2002

East Genoa Methodist Episcopal Church is a historic Methodist Episcopal church located at Genoa in Cayuga County, New York. It is a hand hewn timber-frame structure, sheathed in pine clapboard, and built in 1849 in the Greek Revival style by Edward Palmer. Edward Palmer donated the land across from their family farmhouse for the building in 1846 and was contracted $1200.00 to build the church.

High Victorian Gothic modifications were made in the 1880s.

It was listed on the National Register of Historic Places in 2002.
