= Tuthill-Green House =

Historic house in New York, United States

- U.S. National Register of Historic Places
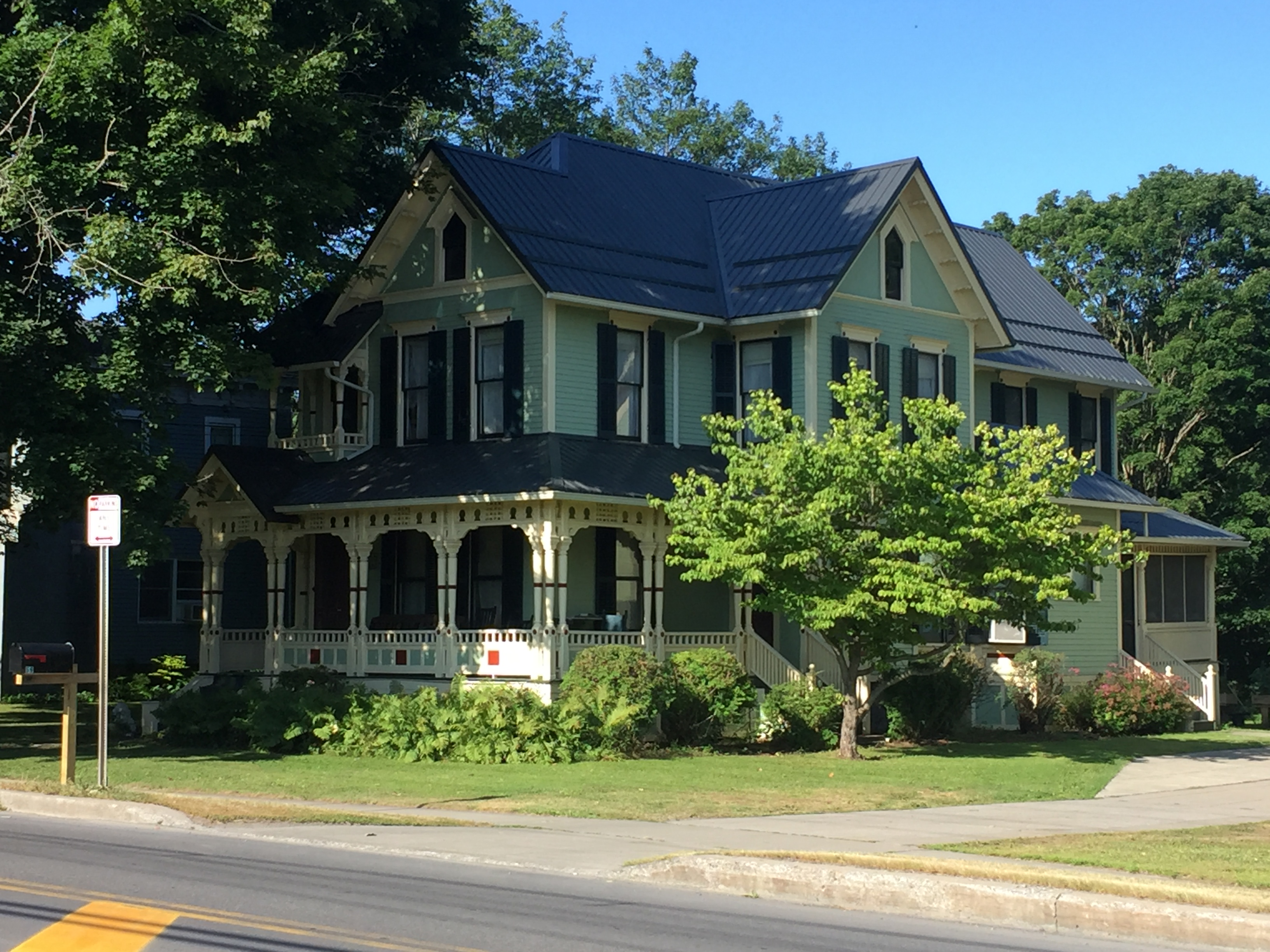
- House in 2022

- Location within New York Location within the United States
- Location: 59 S. Main St., Moravia, New York
- Coordinates: 42.70644°N 76.42116°W
- Area: less than one acre
- Built: 1887
- Architect: James M. Curtis
- Architectural style: Queen Anne
- MPS: Moravia MPS
- NRHP reference No.: 95000066
- Added to NRHP: February 24, 1995

Tuthill-Green House is a historic home located at 59 S. Main St. in the village of Moravia in Cayuga County, New York, United States. It is a 2 1/2-story, frame, Queen Anne–style residence. The house was built about 1887. Also on the property is a 2 1/2-story, frame carriage house, built about 1885.

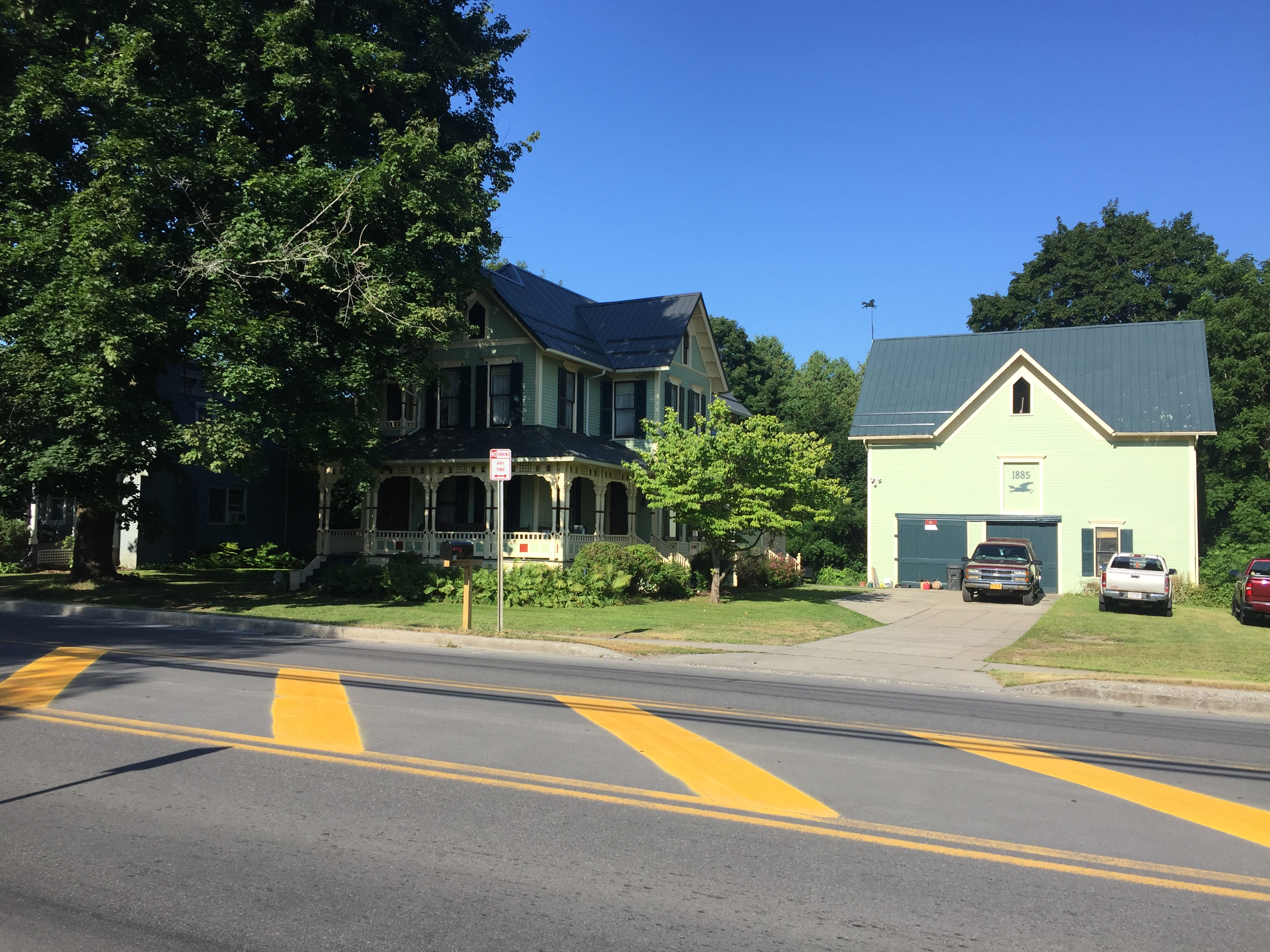
View including carriage house

It was listed on the National Register of Historic Places in 1995, when its address was 52 S. Main St. The street has been renumbered and the house is located at what is now 59 S. Main St.
