= House at 18 Aurora Street =

Historic house in New York, United States

- U.S. National Register of Historic Places
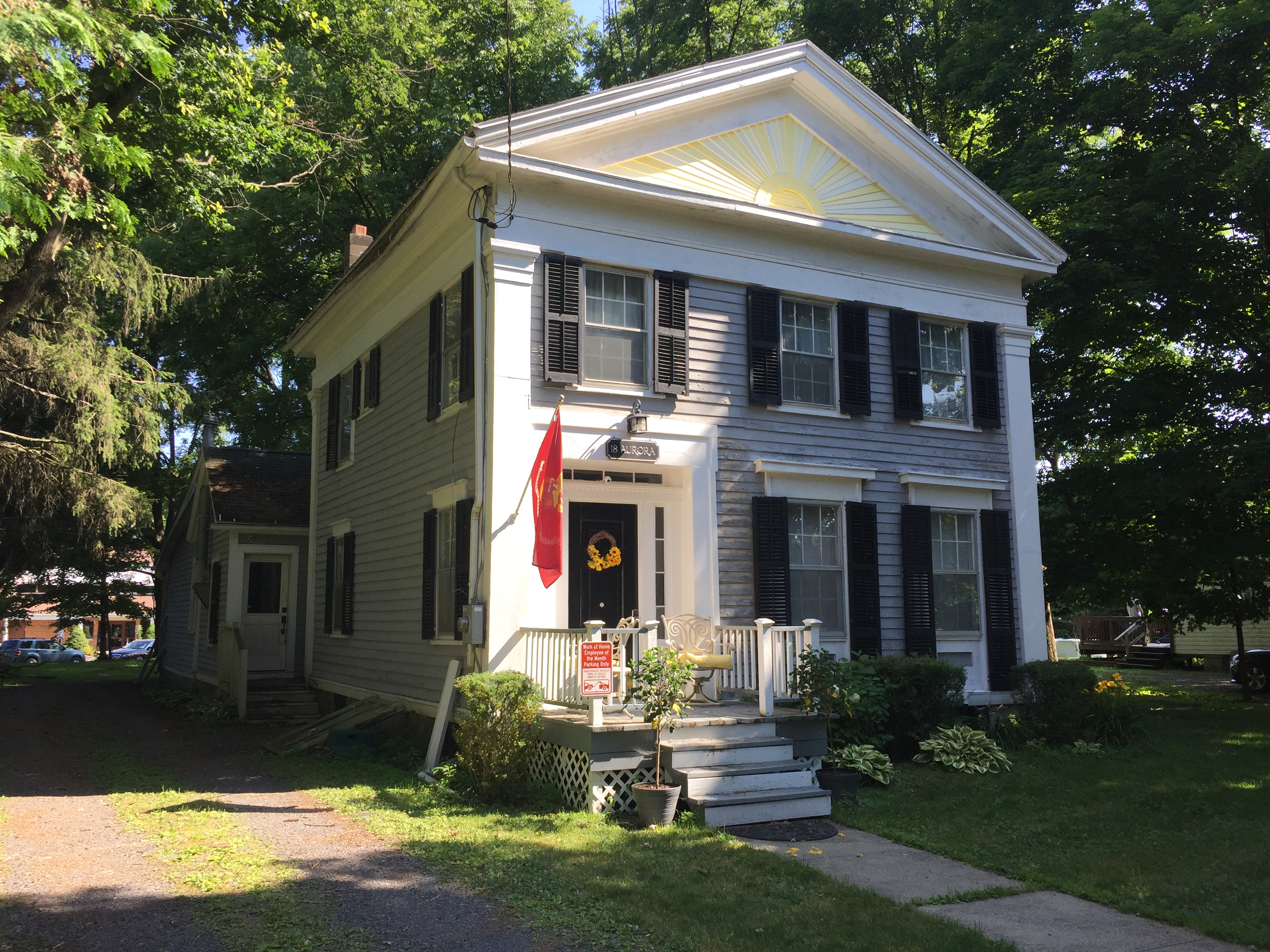
- House in 2022

- Location within New York Location within the United States
- Location: 18 Aurora St., Moravia, New York
- Coordinates: 42°42′39″N 76°25′24″W
- Area: less than one acre
- Built: c. 1850
- Architectural style: Greek Revival
- MPS: Moravia MPS
- NRHP reference No.: 95000058
- Added to NRHP: February 24, 1995

The House at 18 Aurora Street (also known as the Scarry House) in the village of Moravia, in Cayuga County, New York, is listed on the National Register of Historic Places.

== Description and history ==
It is a two-story, frame Greek Revival style dwelling, constructed in about 1850. The structure is dominated by its three-bay wide, side entrance temple front.

Locally it is known as the Scarry House, after the name of a well known family that lived there for many years.

It was listed on the National Register as House at 18 Aurora Street on February 24, 1995.
