= House at 36 South Main Street =

Historic house in New York, United States

- U.S. National Register of Historic Places
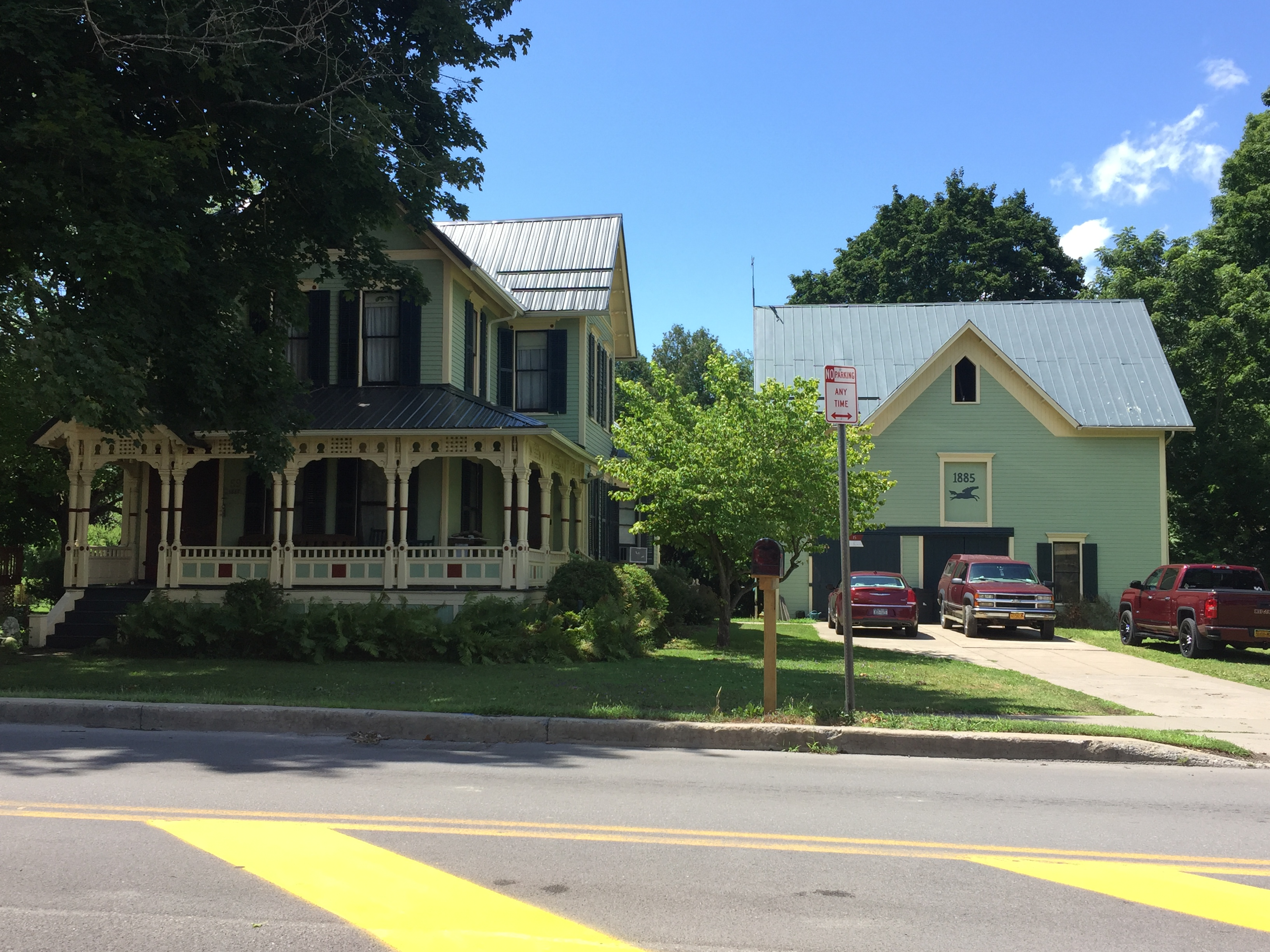

- Location within New York Location within the United States
- Location: 73 S. Main St., Moravia, New York
- Coordinates: 42.70779°N 76.42130°W
- Area: less than one acre
- Architectural style: Queen Anne
- MPS: Moravia MPS
- NRHP reference No.: 95000064
- Added to NRHP: February 24, 1995

The House at 36 South Main Street is a historic home located at what is now numbered 73 South Main Street in the village of Moravia in Cayuga County, New York. It is a 2 1/2-story, frame, Queen Anne–style residence. The house appears to have been built about 1890. The front facade is notable for its 1-story porch that extends the width of the façade.

It was listed on the National Register of Historic Places in 1995 as "House at 36 South Main Street".

Numbering on Main Street in Moravia was changed sometime after the 1995 NRHP listing, and the property is located at what is now 73 South Main Street.
