= West High School (Auburn, New York) =

Former high school and middle school building in Auburn, New York, United States

- U.S. National Register of Historic Places
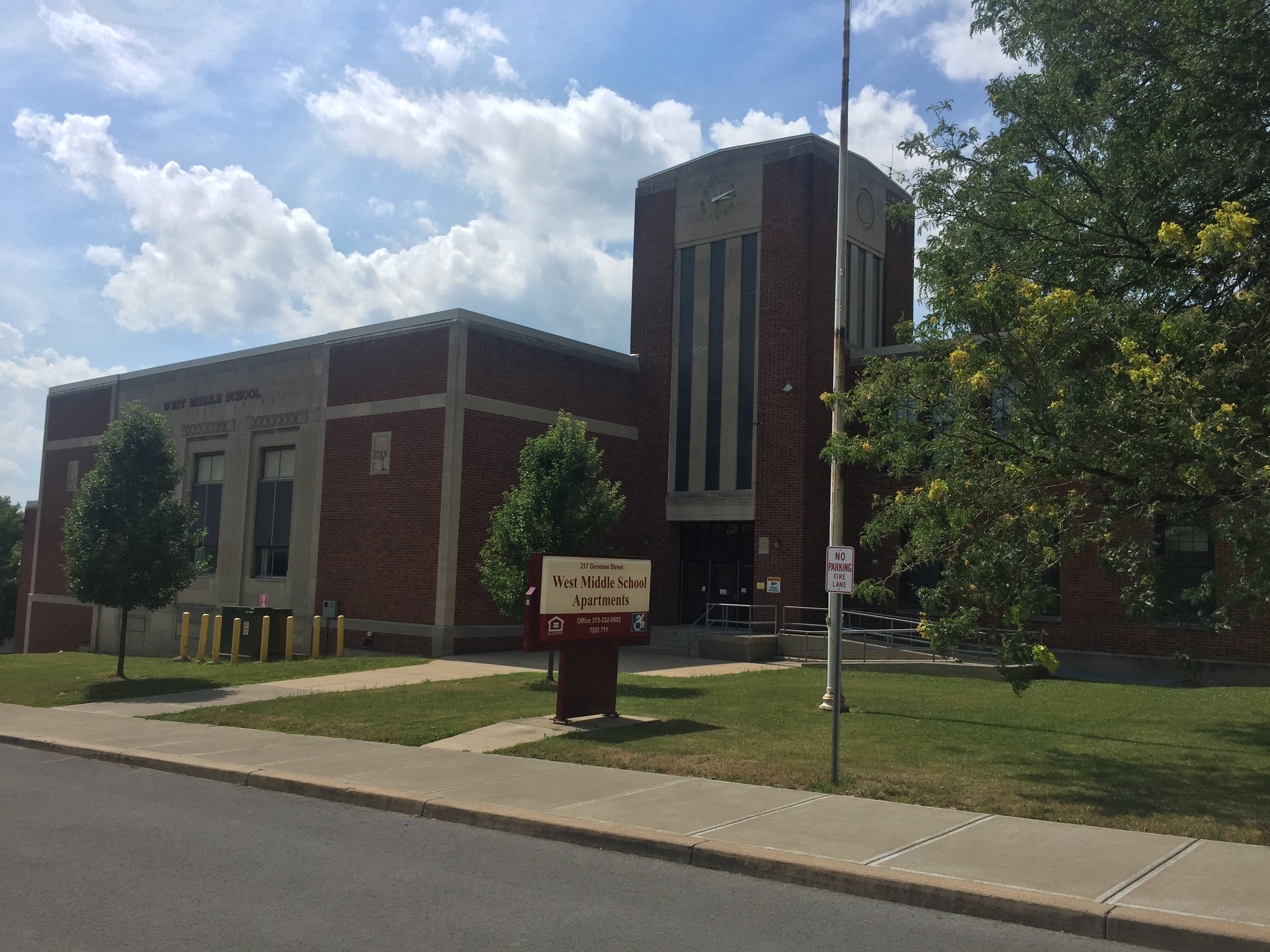
- Building in 2022

- Location within New York Location within the United States
- Location: 217 Genesee St., Auburn, New York
- Coordinates: 42.926212°N 76.578376°W
- Built: 1938
- NRHP reference No.: 100001484
- Added to NRHP: August 18, 2017

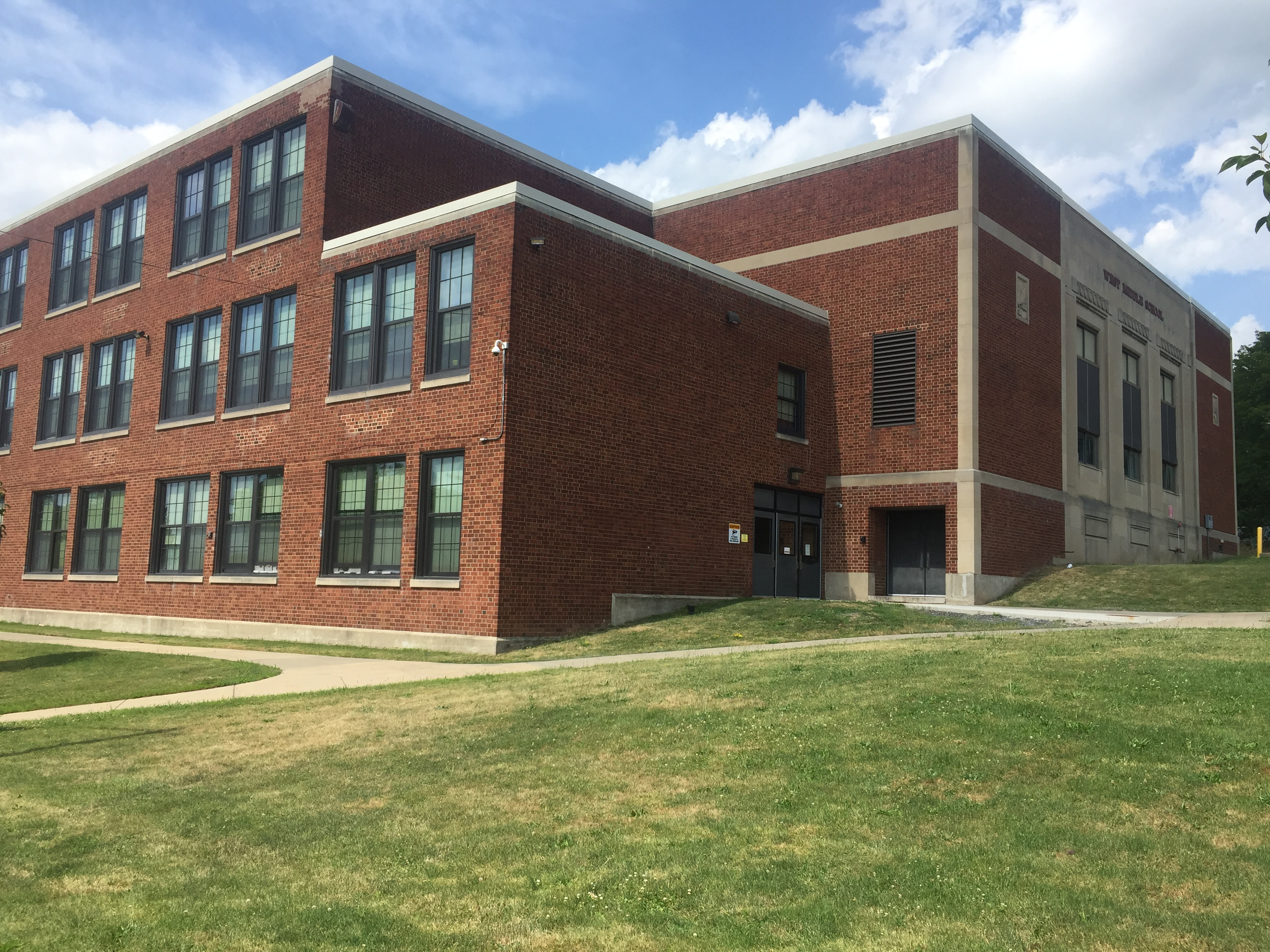
Another perspective on building, in 2022

West High School is a historic school building, once a high school and later a middle school, located at Auburn in Cayuga County, New York. It was listed on the National Register of Historic Places in 2017. It has been renovated and is now an apartment complex known as West Middle School Apartments, with 59 one- and two-bedroom apartment units.

It closed as a middle school in 2012.

It was one of 22 New York State properties recommended for National Register listing in a batch in 2017. According to a news article, "Built in 1938, Auburn's West High School differed from more traditional schools by emphasizing training for students planning to enter the industrial workforce, and the school’s design reflected this by including workshop style classrooms for practical, task oriented training."

The building is embellished by four low-relief sculptures depicting, perhaps, four categories of study: industrial arts, film, arts, and sciences:

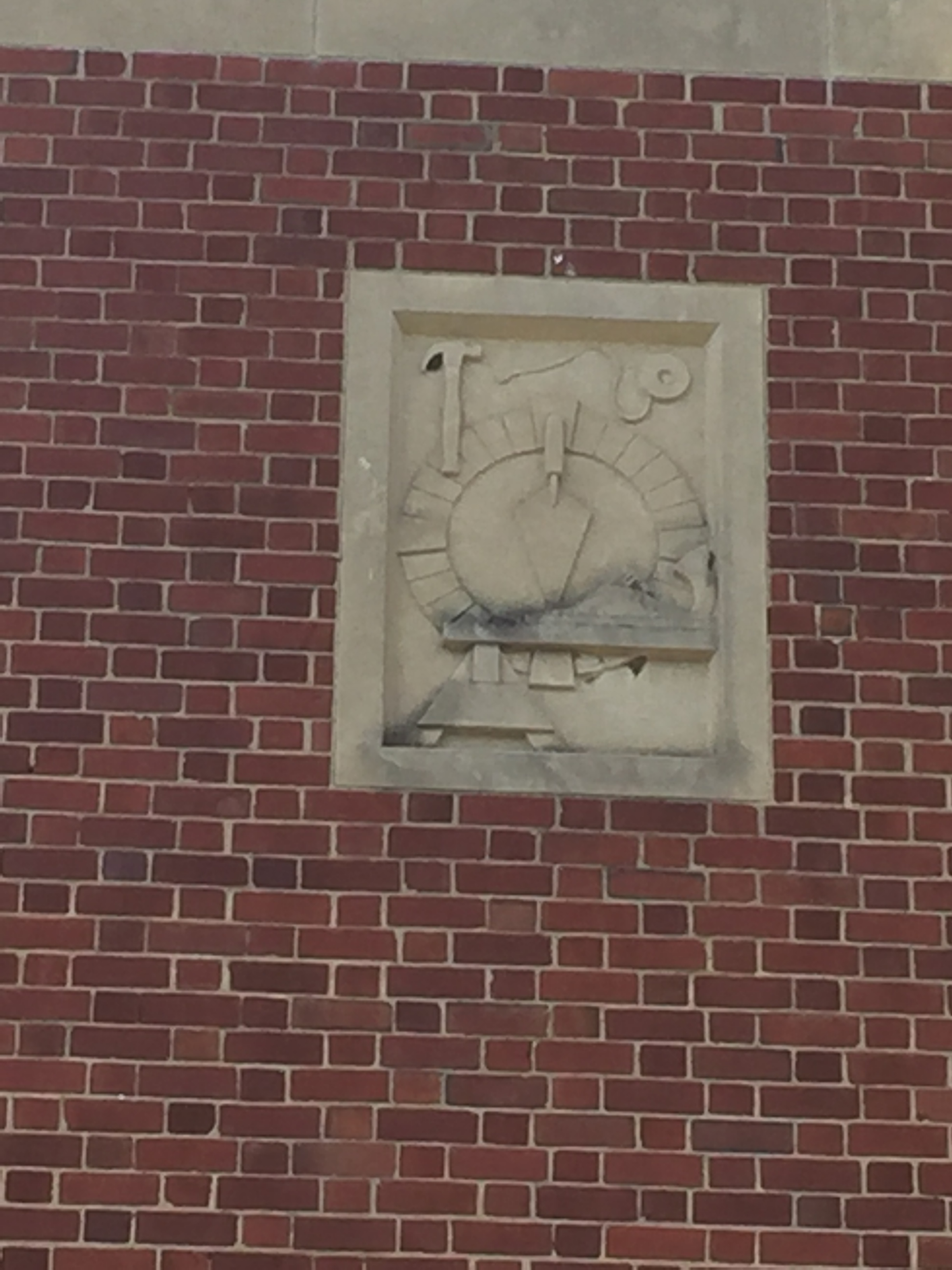
Industrial arts?

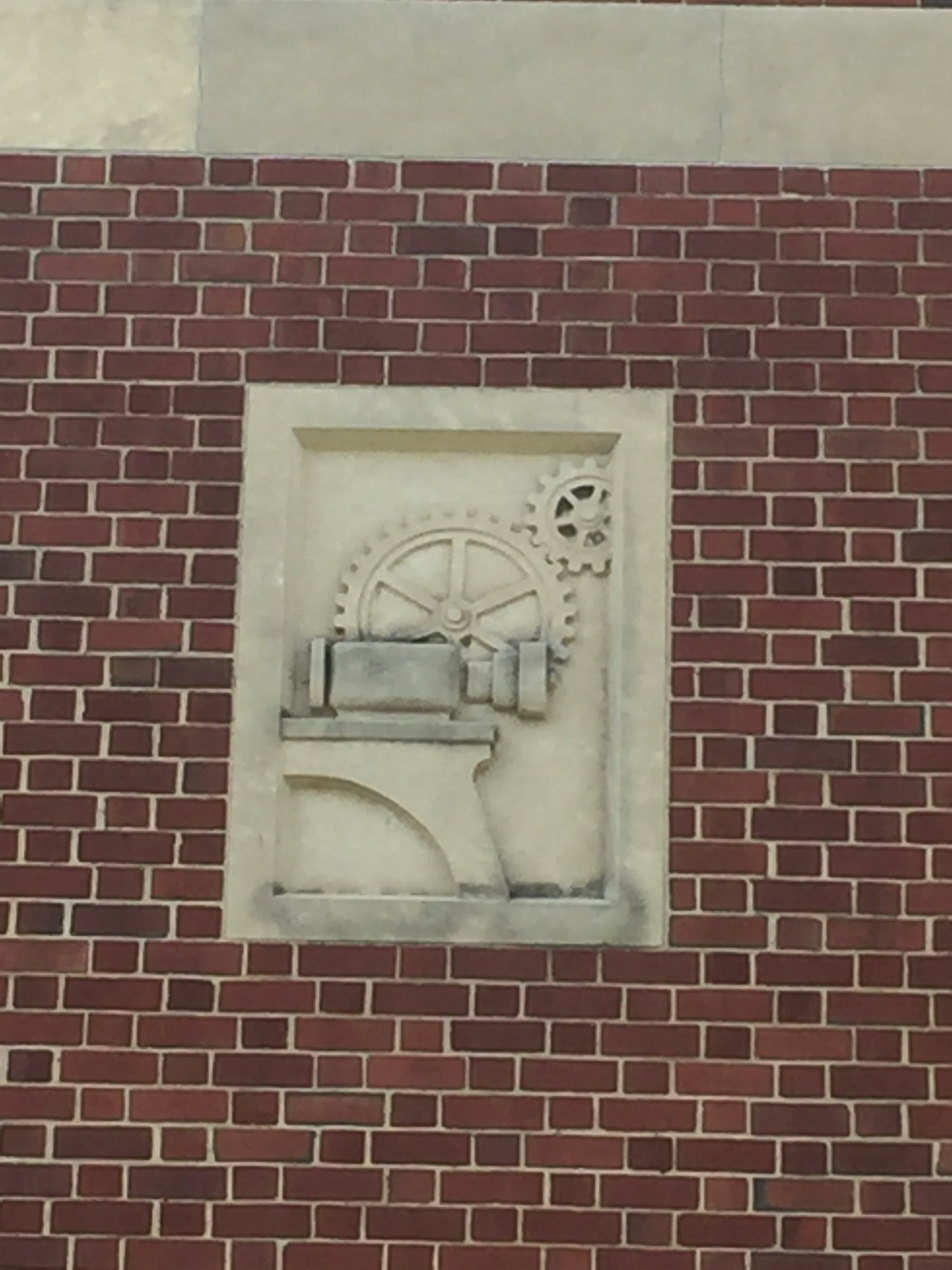
Film?
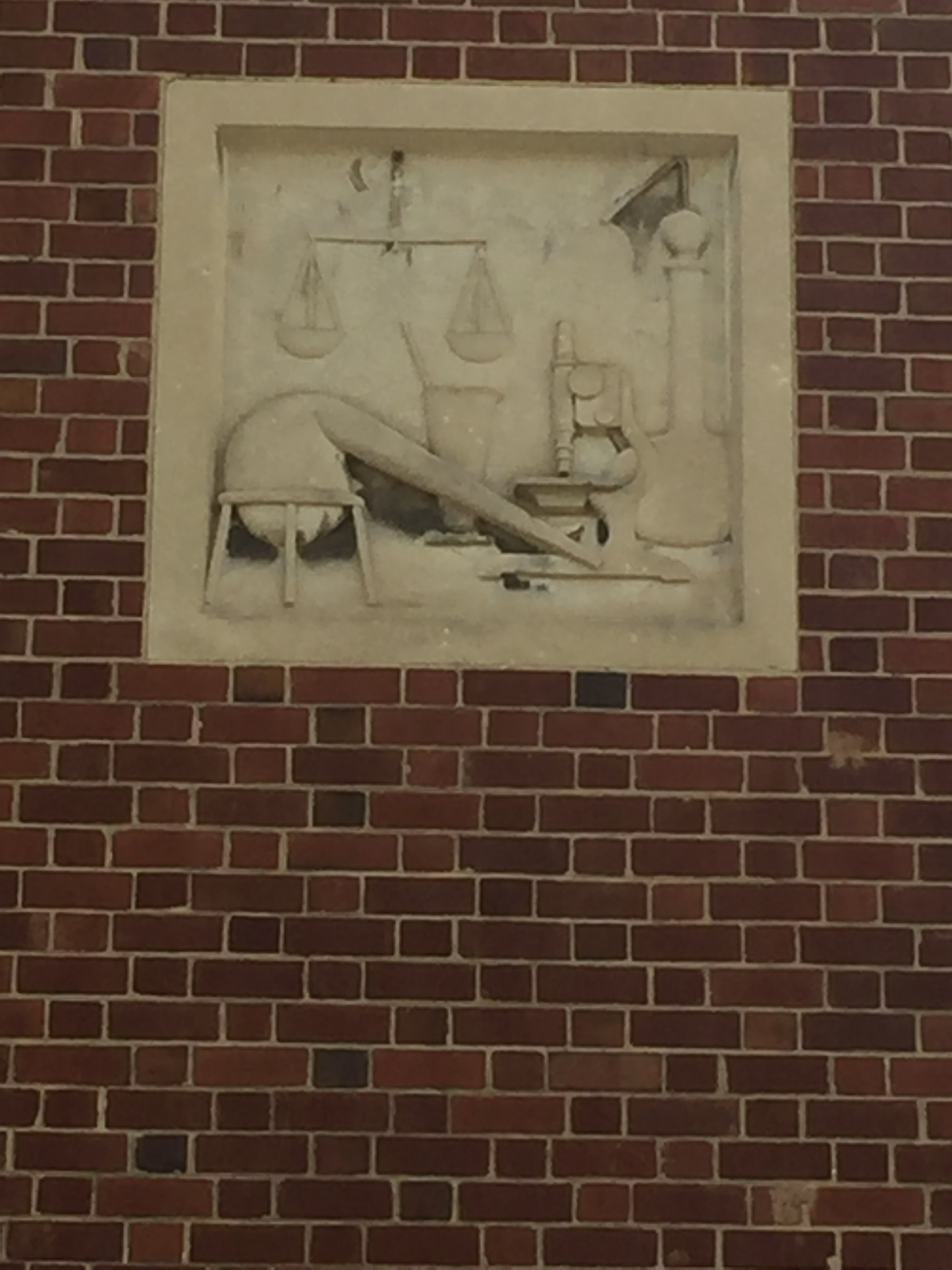
Sciences?

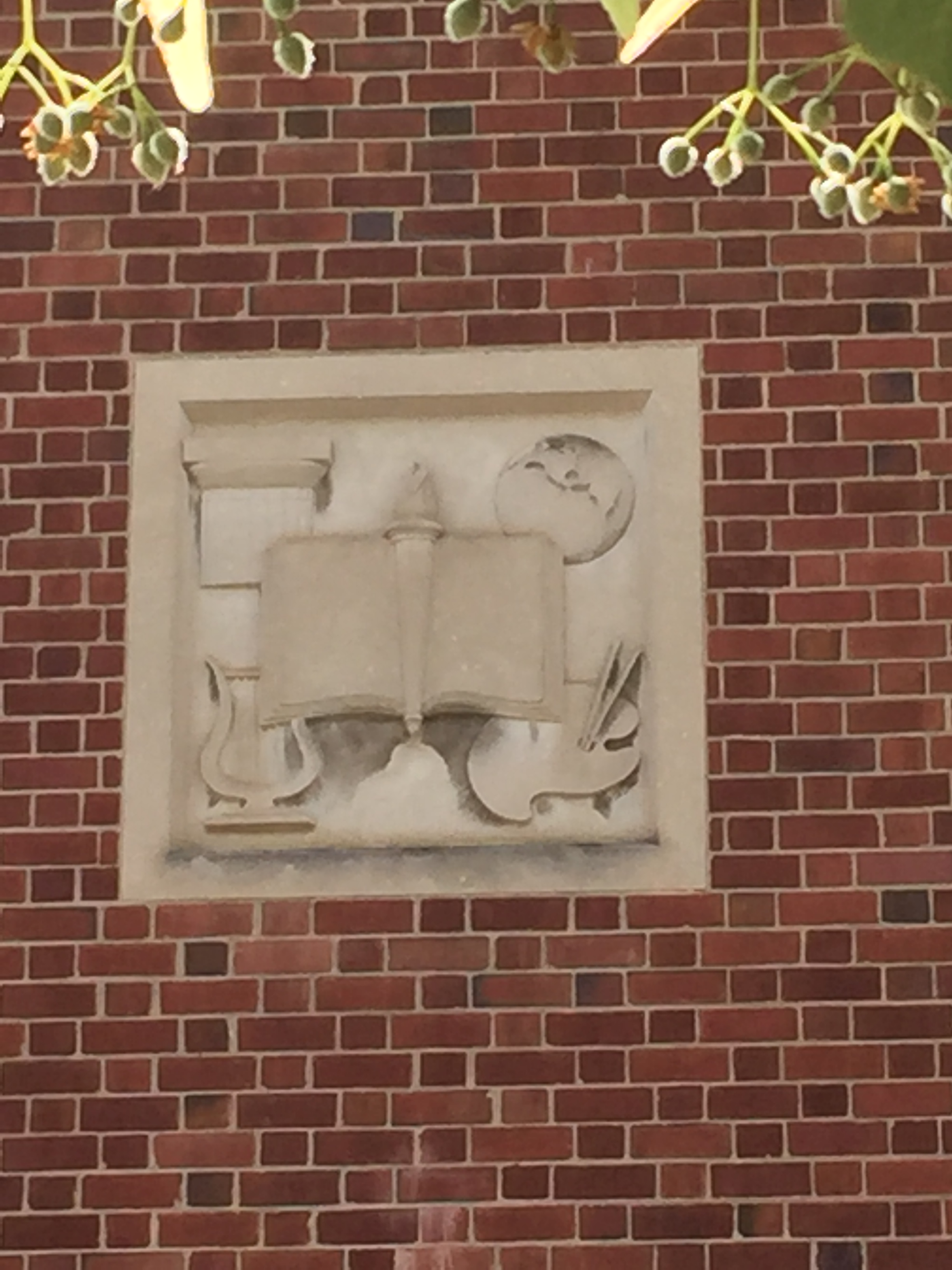
Arts?
