= Ezra A. Huntington House =

- U.S. National Register of Historic Places
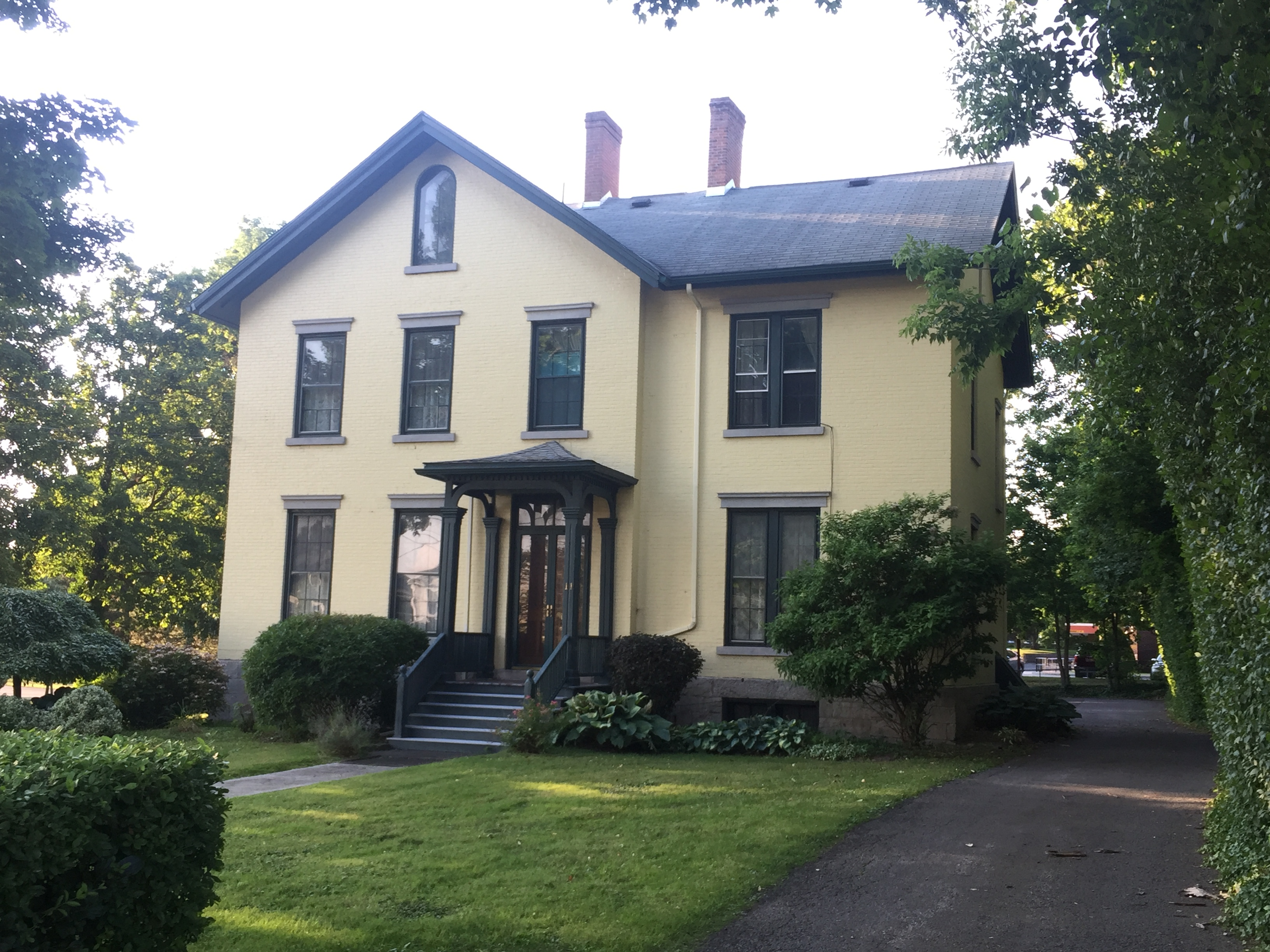

- Location within New York
- Location: 11 Seminary St., Auburn, New York
- Coordinates: 42.9357°N 76.5651°W
- Architectural style: Italianate
- NRHP reference No.: 100004914
- Added to NRHP: January 31, 2020

The Ezra A. Huntington House, at 11 Seminary St. in Auburn, New York, was built in 1861. It served as the house of first president of the Auburn Theological Seminary. It is somewhat Italianate in style.

It was home of Ezra Abel Huntington (1813-1901).

In January 2020, the City of Auburn's Historic Resources Review Board's meeting minutes note that the property had been nominated to the New York State Historic Register and was recommended to be nominated to the U.S. National Register of Historic Places. In fact it was listed on the National Register on January 31, 2020.

Later in 2021, the Preservation Association of Central New York was to award its Stewardship Award to Dr. Stephen and Judy Coleman for their longterm care of the house.
