= Sager House (Moravia, New York) =

Historic house in New York, United States

- U.S. National Register of Historic Places
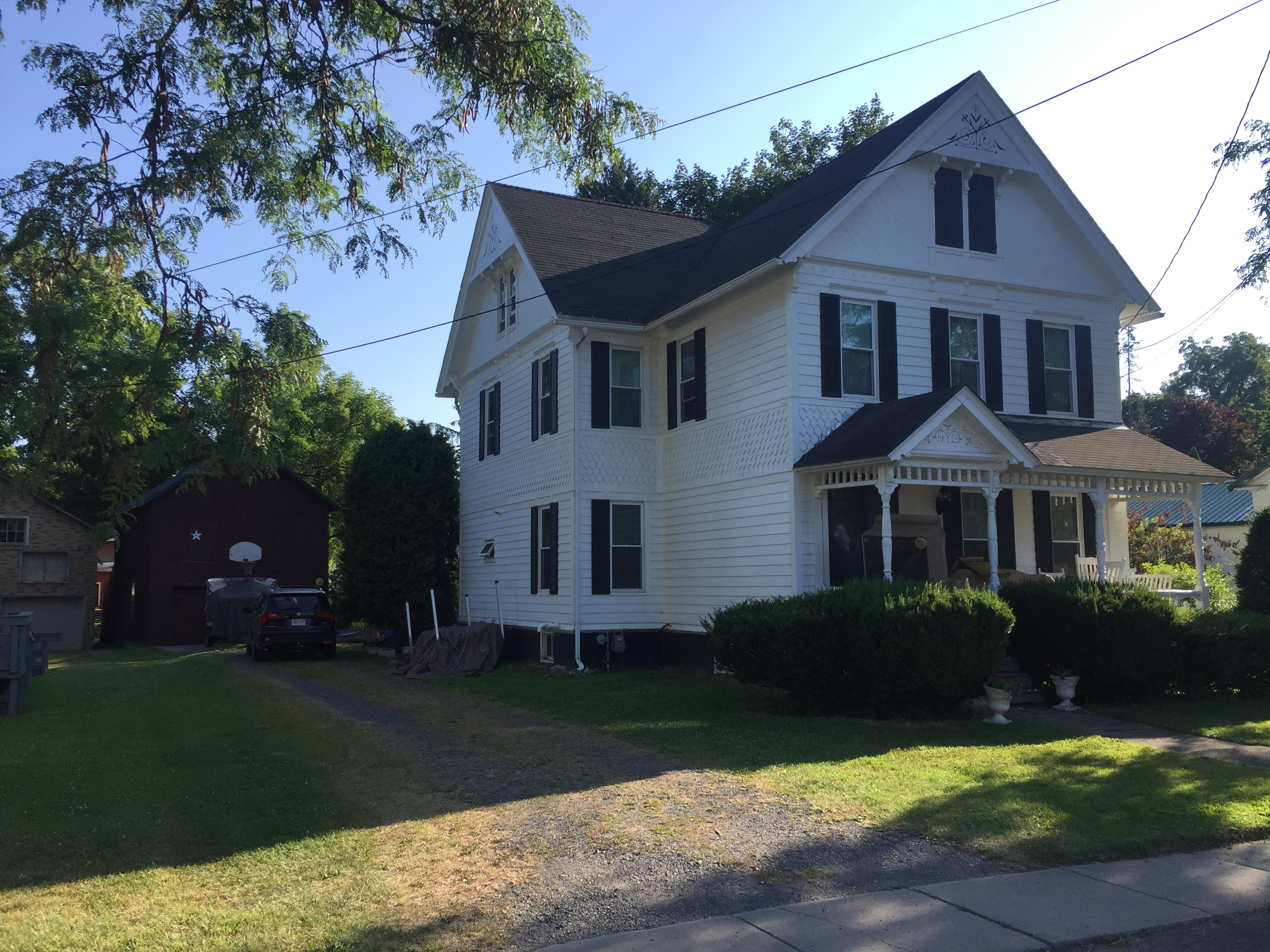
- House, with carriage house behind, in 2022

- Location within New York Location within the United States
- Location: 12 W. Cayuga St., Moravia, New York
- Coordinates: 42°42′50″N 76°25′24″W
- Area: less than one acre
- Built: 1884
- Built by: Patten, James; Harris, James
- Architectural style: Queen Anne
- MPS: Moravia MPS
- NRHP reference No.: 95000061
- Added to NRHP: February 24, 1995

Sager House is a historic home located at 12 West Cayuga Street in the village of Moravia in Cayuga County, New York. It is a 2½-story, frame, Queen Anne–style residence, with a cruciform plan. The house was built in 1884. Also on the property is a 2-story, frame carriage house. It was built by carpenters/construction managers James Patten and James Harris.

It was deemed architecturally significant "as an intact and representative example of Queen Anne style residential architecture in Moravia, associated with the village's post-Civil War prosperity." It was listed on the National Register of Historic Places in 1995.
