= Sherwood Equal Rights Historic District =

Historic district in New York, United States

- U.S. National Register of Historic Places
- U.S. Historic district
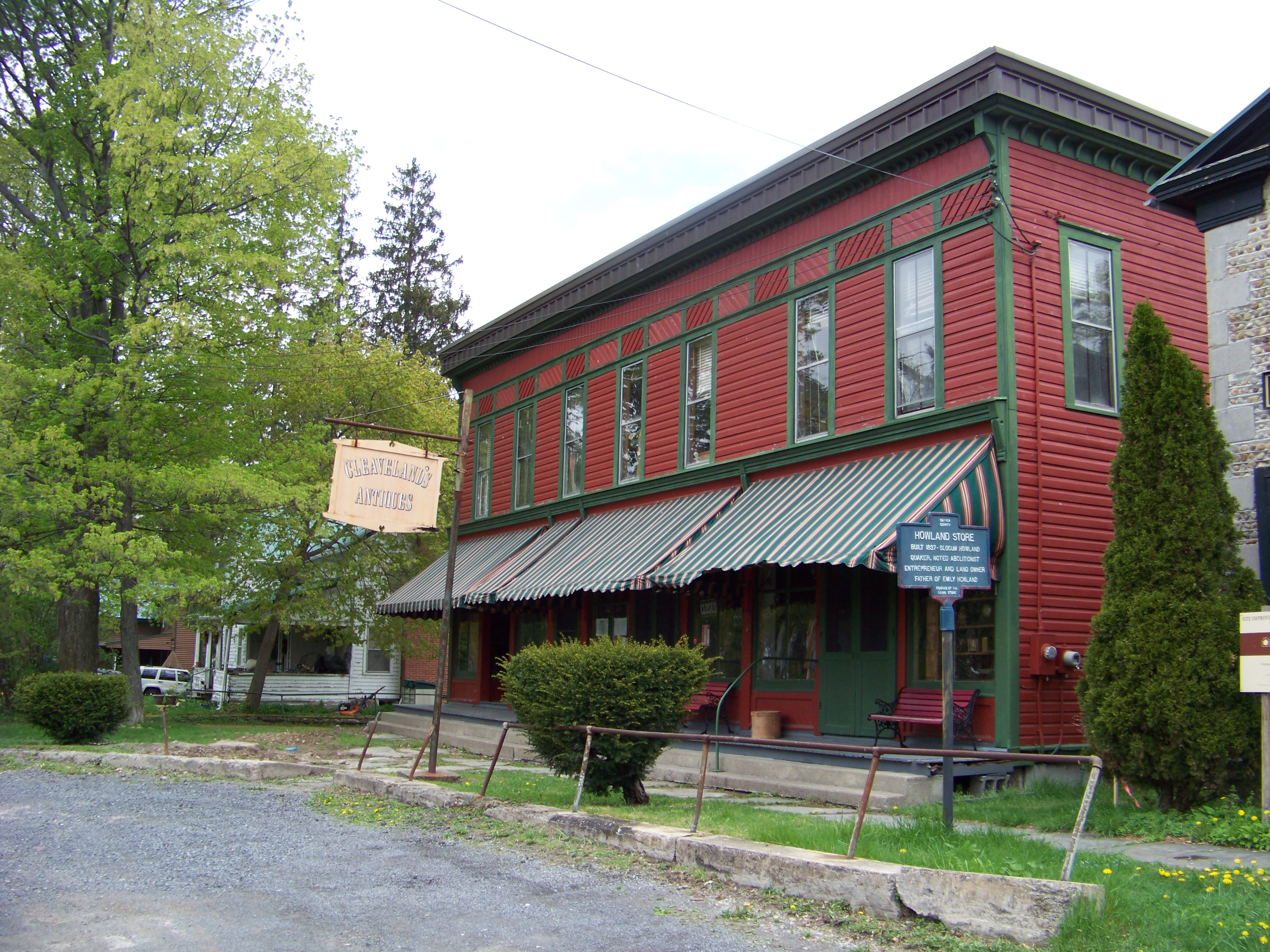

- Location within New York Location within the United States
- Location: Sherwood Rd. & NY 34B, Sherwood, New York
- Coordinates: 42°45′39.69″N 76°37′16.95″W
- Area: 30 acres (12 ha)
- Architectural style: Federal, Greek Revival
- MPS: Freedom Trail, Abolitionism, and African American Life in Central New York MPS
- NRHP reference No.: 08000096
- Added to NRHP: February 29, 2008

Sherwood Equal Rights Historic District is a national historic district located at Sherwood in Cayuga County, New York. The district consists of 29 properties containing 27 contributing primary buildings, one contributing site (cemetery), three contributing carriage houses and one non-contributing building in the historic core of the hamlet of Sherwood. It encompasses the entire hamlet and includes several commercial / civic structures at the intersection of New York State Route 34B and Sherwod Road. The structures commemorate the historical Quaker community's dedication to abolition, women's rights, and education.

== History ==
Sherwood was settled in 1794 on former agricultural lands of the Cayuga people. Access to the area was available via both land and water and was a center for local trade. The community was a mixture of families who were Quakers migrating from surrounding areas and England or freed slaves of African descent and many travelled or had connections to communities outside of Sherwood. The hamlet was shaped by Quaker ideologies which promoted abolition, women's rights and education. Equal rights activities attracted various reformers including: Abby Kelley, Harriet K. Hunt, Mary and Emily Edmondson, Joseph John Gurney, Sojourner Truth, Rev. Anna Howard Shaw, Susan B. Anthony, and Harriet Tubman.

On January 20, 1835 both Quakers and African Americans signed the first antislavery petition from Cayuga County and sent to Congress. Residents of the community also participated in the Underground Railroad with freedom seekers either staying in the area or moving on North to Canada. The activism of the community around equal rights lasted long after the Civil War due to rich agricultural land which promoted stable families in the area. Local institutions included the Women’s Christian Temperance Union, the Sherwood Political Equality Club, the Sherwood Ramabai Circle, and the Sherwood Select School.

While the whole community participated in these movements, it was three generations of the Howland family – Slocum Howland, his daughter Emily Howland, his son and daughter-in-law William and Hannah Howland, and his granddaughter Isabel Howland – who were among the leaders both locally and nationally.

It was listed on the National Register of Historic Places in 2008.

== Architecture ==
The district consists of 29 properties, the majority of Sherwood, 10 are related to African Americans, 5 to the Underground Railroad, 16 to Quakers, and 11 to education. Properties were built between the 1820s and 1910 and are one-to-two stories constructed of heavy timber. Architectural styles include Federal, Greek Revival, Gothic, Italianate, Stick Style, and Victorian.

Located within the district are the separately listed Howland Cobblestone Store, now a museum which includes a large collection of women’s rights memorabilia, and Slocum and Hannah Howland House.

== Gallery ==
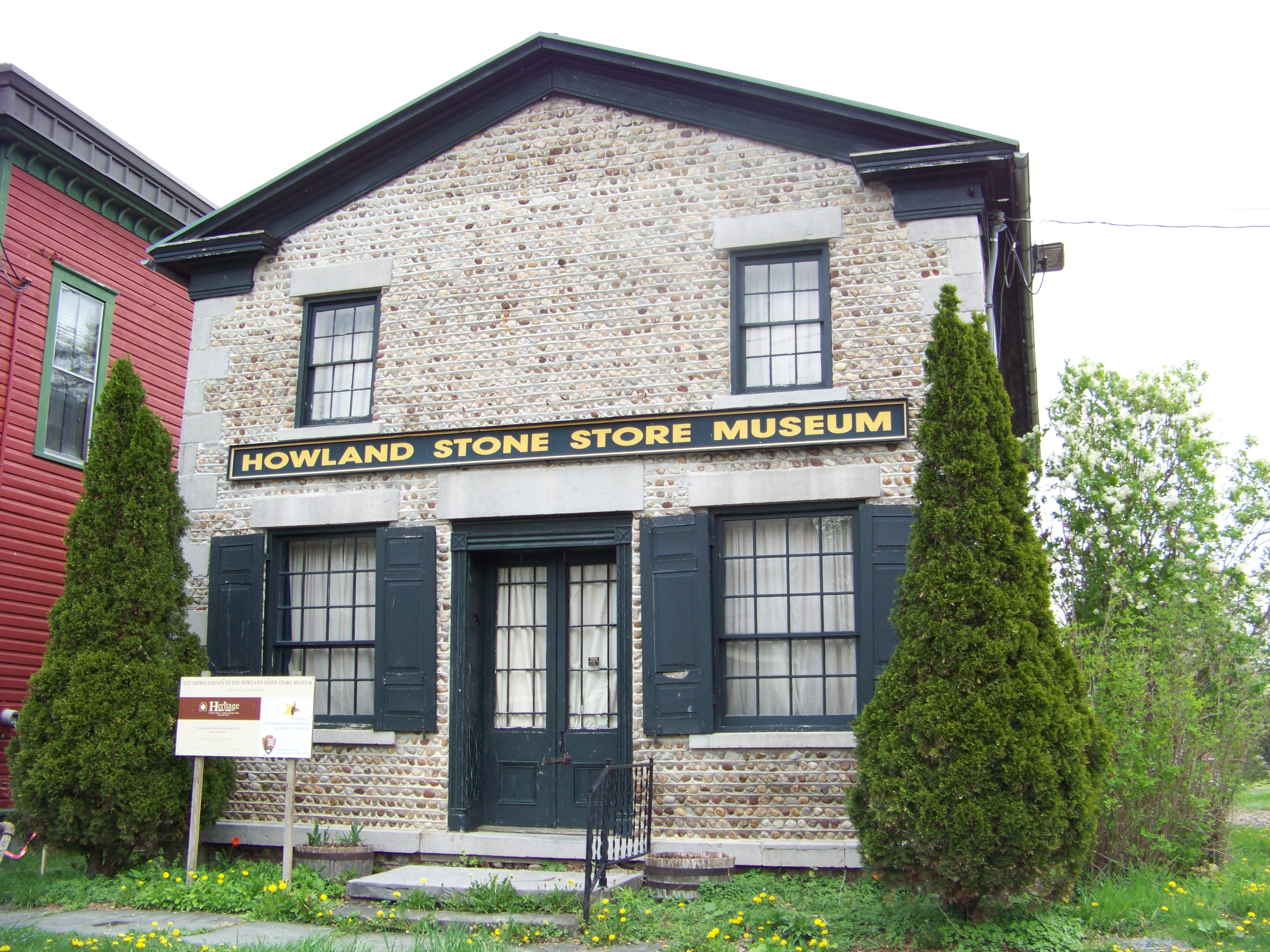
Howland Cobblestone Store

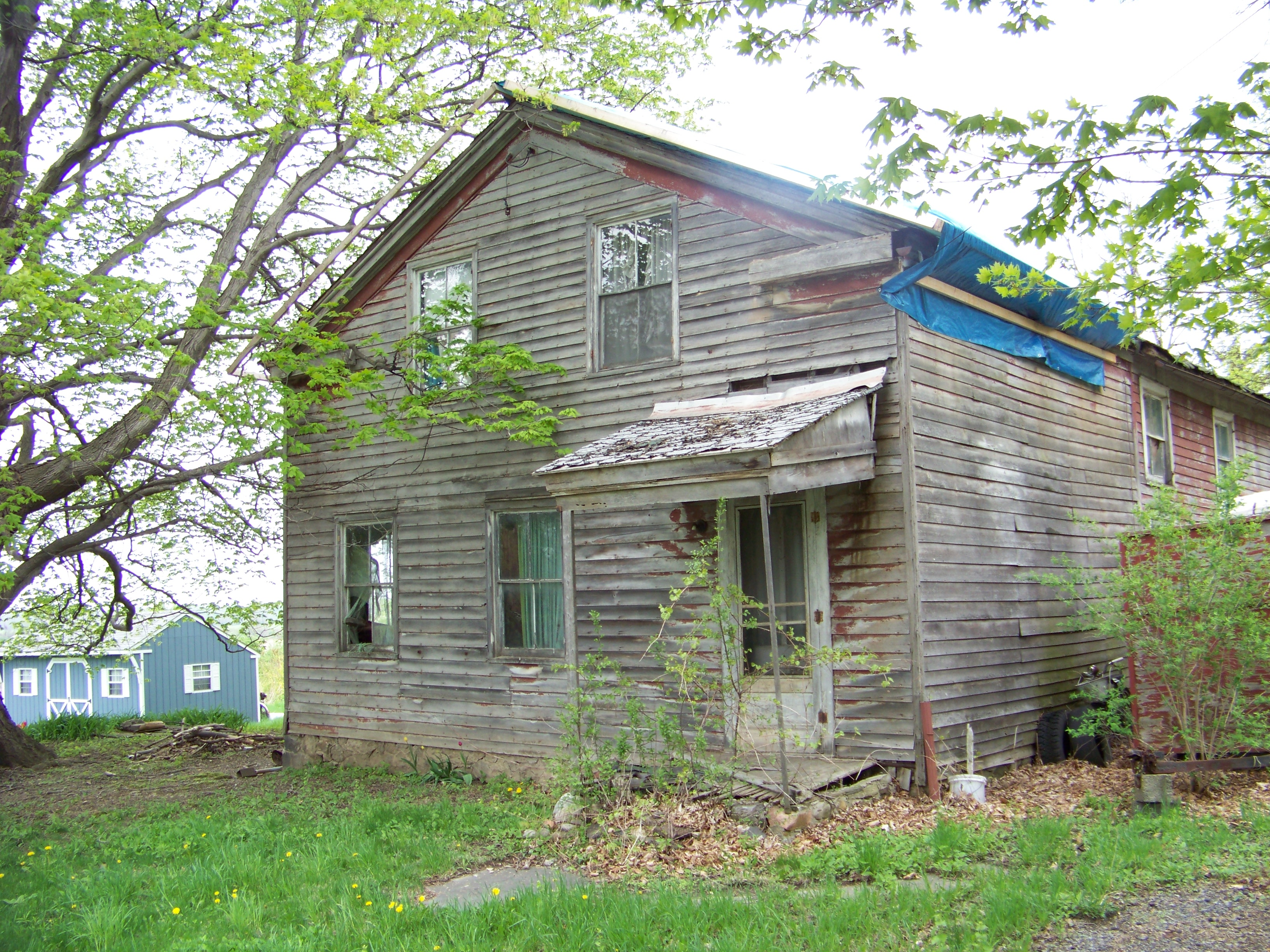
Slocum and Hannah Howland House

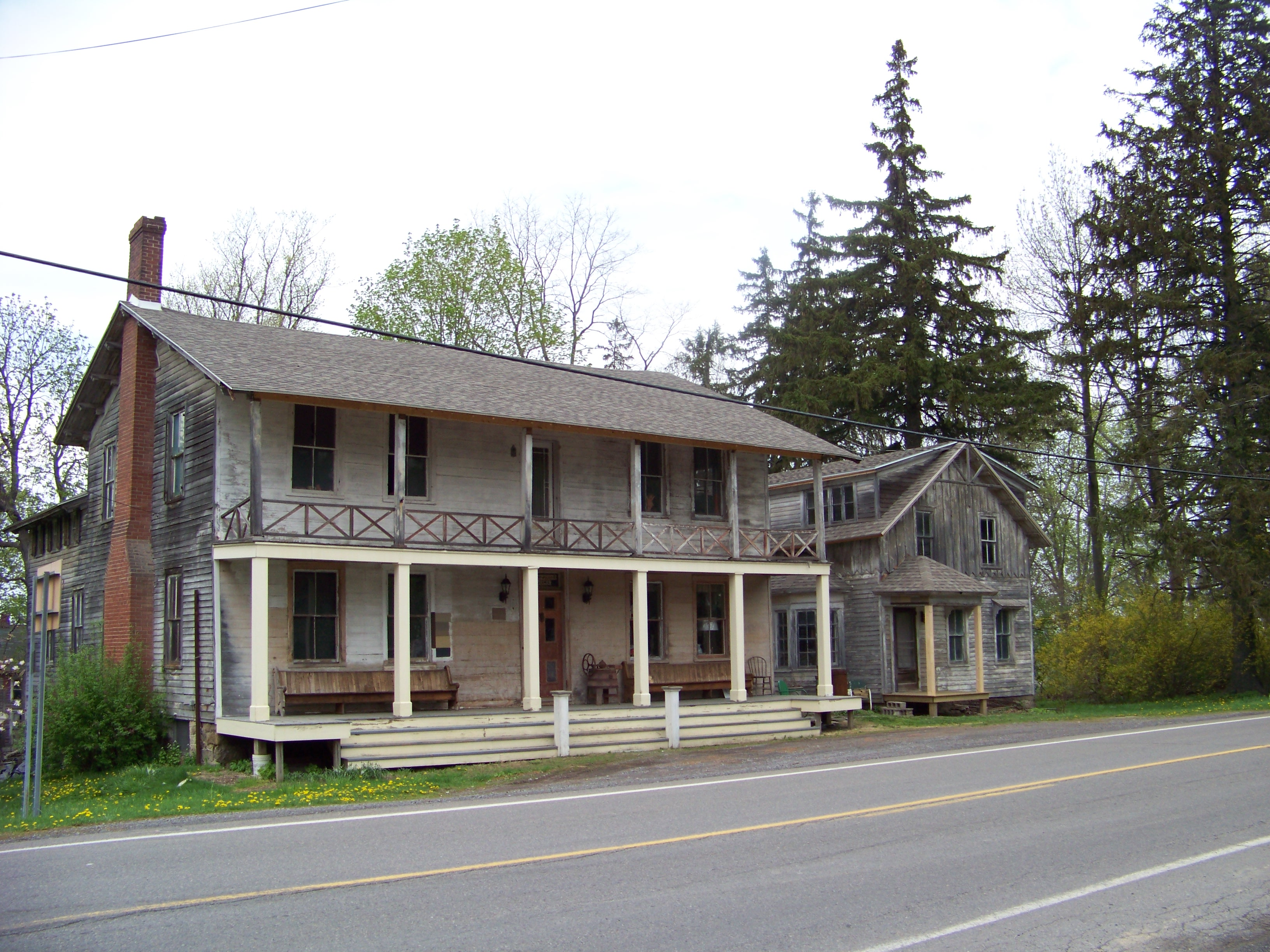
Sherwood House and Annex

== See also ==
- National Register of Historic Places listings in Cayuga County, New York
