= Shane Hurlbut =

American cinematographer (born 1964)

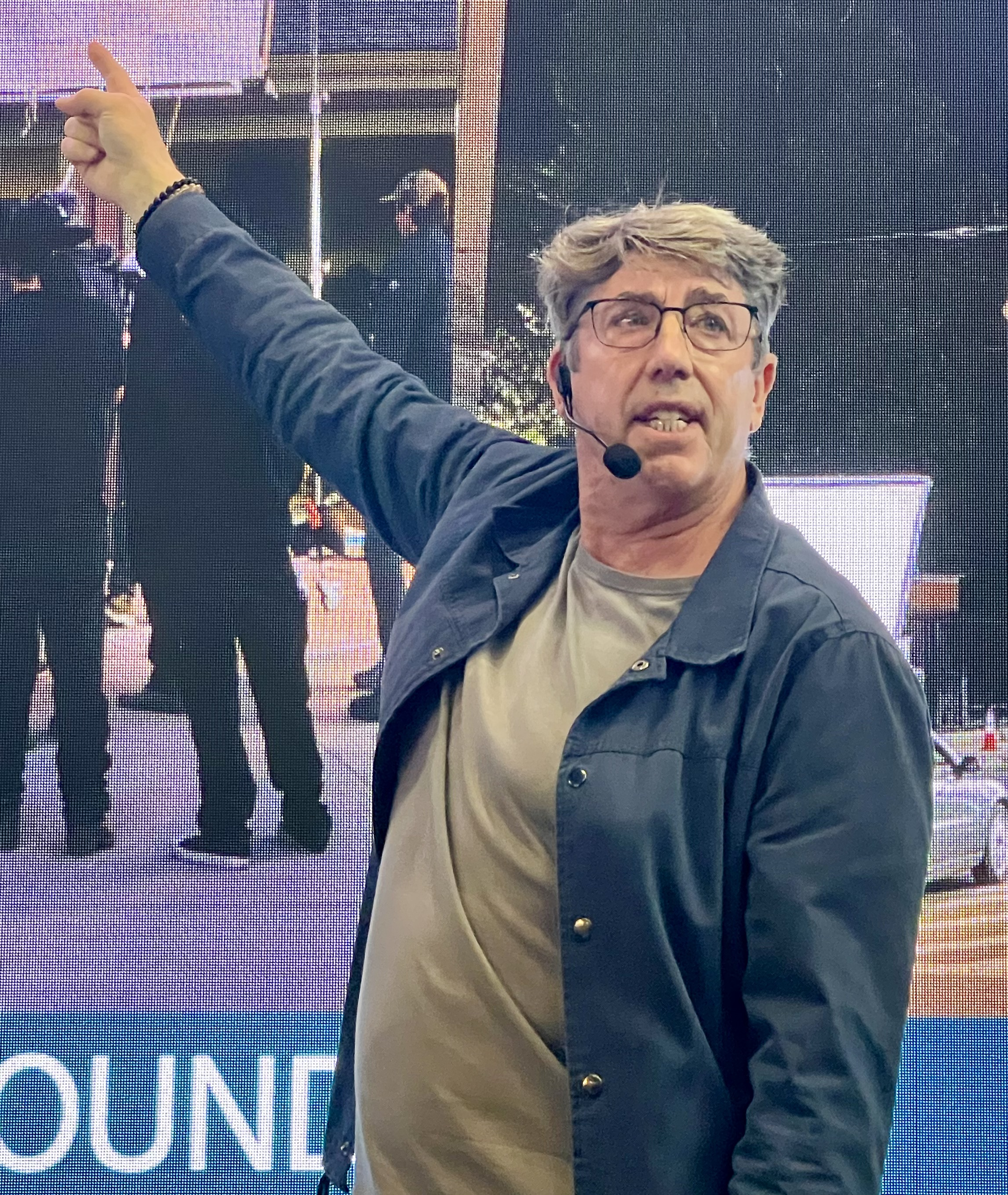
- Hurlbut in 2025
- Born: February 18, 1964 (age 62); Ithaca, New York, United States
- Other name: L. Shane Hurlbut
- Education: Emerson College; Herkimer County Community College; Southern Cayuga High School
- Spouse: Lydia Kunkler
- Children: 2
- Website: www.ShaneHurlbut.com

Shane Hurlbut, ASC (born February 18, 1964) is an American cinematographer.

== Early life ==
Hurlbut was raised in Ithaca, New York. His mother taught sixth grade, and his father worked as a professor's assistant (PA) at Cornell University. He grew up on a farm in Aurora, New York near Cayuga Lake, and graduated from Southern Cayuga High School in 1982. He married Lydia Kunkler, a fellow graduate of Southern Cayuga.

Hurlbut attended Herkimer County Community College, graduating with a degree in radio and television broadcasting in 1984, and he was inducted into the Alumni Hall of Honor by the Herkimer County Community College Alumni Association on April 4, 2008. Hurlbut received a bachelor's degree from Emerson College, where he majored in film and television. He graduated from Emerson College in 1986.

== Career ==
=== 1987–2004 ===
Hurlbut moved to Los Angeles in 1987, where he began work in film as a driver, key grip, and gaffer, before becoming a cinematographer. He was a grip truck driver for the 1988 film Phantasm II. His early career included work on music videos for Gloria Estefan and Smashing Pumpkins, photo shoot work with photographer Herb Ritts for an April 1997 Absolut Vodka spread in Vogue magazine, and work on a Nissan "Enjoy the Ride" commercial. He met director Rob Cohen while working on the Donna Summer/Bruce Roberts music video for the 1996 disaster film Daylight. Hurlbut again worked with Cohen as cinematographer for the 1997 NBC television pilot The Guardian. In 1997 Hurlbut's career focused on light as applied to photography and film, and he owned a lighting business in Pasadena, California. Hurlbut assisted friends from Southern Cayuga in their film careers, including Dan Wade and Tim Carr.

Cohen selected Hurlbut as his cinematographer for the 1998 television movie The Rat Pack, which was Hurlbut's feature film debut. His lighting style for the movie was heavily influenced by the glamour photography of George Hurrell. Hurlbut received a nomination for an award from the American Society of Cinematographers for his cinematography work on the movie, becoming the youngest cinematographer ever to have been nominated for an American Society of Cinematographers award for a debut film. Hurlbut worked again with Cohen on the 2000 film The Skulls, which was his first theatrical feature film.

He received positive comments for his work on the 2002 film Drumline, directed by Charles Stone III. "With 300 students dancing, running, jumping, singing and playing, Stone and cinematographer Shane Hurlbut bring you right inside the brassy band, nudged between the tubas, saxophones and clarinets," wrote Clint O'Connor of The Plain Dealer. Charles Taylor of Salon commented "The movie was shot by Shane Hurlbut and none of the shots call attention to themselves. Instead you're struck by the beauty of watching a row of drummers' hands as they blur with the rhythm their sticks are beating out." Hurlbut worked with director Barry Levinson, as cinematographer for The Adventures of Seinfeld & Superman advertisements for American Express.

In 2004, Hurlbut teamed up with director Charles Stone III again to work on the film Mr. 3000. In a positive review of the film, Harper Barnes of the St. Louis Post-Dispatch highlighted Hurlbut, noting he had previously worked with the film's editor, Bill Pankow, on Drumline. In a review of Mr. 3000 for The Manhattan Mercury, arts critic G.W. Clift specifically highlighted Hurlbut's work on the film, commenting: "Mr. 3000 has several attractions, even unexpected ones like Shane Hurlbut's heart-stopping photography. ... one doesn't mind that it lingers over scenes, in part because the scenes look so very good." In his review Mr. 3000 for the Intelligencer Journal, Jack Roberts also highlighted Hurlbut's work on the film.

=== 2005–present ===
Hurlbut's cinematography work on the 2005 film Into the Blue received positive reception from film critic Roger Ebert. In a review of Into the Blue for the San Francisco Chronicle, Peter Hartlaub noted, "director of photography Shane Hurlbut does some nice work in tight places". Though Associated Press writer David Germain gave a negative review overall of Into the Blue, he wrote positively of Hurlbut's cinematography work, commenting: "Shane Hurlbut's cinematography buoys the movie, but his lovely pictures of the actors swimming among jellyfish and shimmery aquatic vegetation cannot compensate for everything else."

Bob Strauss of the Los Angeles Daily News also wrote positively of Hurlbut's work in his review of Into the Blue, writing: "The undersea photography, much of it shot amid schools of wild sharks, is exquisite..." Strauss also commented positively on Hurlbut's work on the 2005 film The Greatest Game Ever Played, writing he "does a great job of making golf look cinematic". Soren Andersen of The News Tribune wrote of Hurlbut's work on The Greatest Game Ever Played: "Shot by cinematographer Shane Hurlbut, the picture is extraordinarily handsome, with its velvety green fairways and its burnished, candlelit interiors." Joan E. Vadeboncoeur of The Post-Standard was critical of the film's script, but praised Hurlbut's work: "Director Bill Paxton does have a splendid cinematographer, Shane Hurlbut, contributing beauty and atmosphere."

In 2005, Hurlbut became the first cinematographer to utilize the InDI process developed by LaserPacific, while working on the film Something New. In 2006, Hurlbut became a member of the American Society of Cinematographers. Hurlbut's cinematography work on the 2006 romantic comedy was positively received by film critic Michael H. Kleinschrodt of The Times-Picayune, who wrote: "Cinematographer Shane Hurlbut finds interesting angles from which to shoot and photographs a formal cotillion with panache." Kevin Canfield of The Journal News noted that Hurlbut assisted director Sanaa Hamri with "one lovely scene of the lovers bathed in the orangy light of morning and another, shot from overhead, of couples twirling on a dance floor".

Hurlbut worked on the 2006 film Waist Deep with director Vondie Curtis-Hall, and Tom Keogh of The Seattle Times described their work on shots prior to a kidnapping scene in the film as "close to breathtaking". Hurlbut worked as cinematographer on the 2008 film Semi-Pro starring Will Ferrell, and Steven Boone of The Star-Ledger noted: "...Shane Hurlbut's widescreen sports cinematography does conspire with two notorious disco covers of classical music to give us a thrill along with the cheap laughs." Hurlbut collaborated with director McG as director of photography on the 2006 film We Are Marshall. Hurlbut and McG decided to use vintage lenses and film stock from the time period to evoke a feeling of the 1970s.

Charles Stone III, director of the original "Whassup?" commercial campaign for Anheuser-Busch Budweiser beer, remembered Hurlbut from their work together on Drumline, and contacted him in 2008 to make a video in support of Barack Obama's 2008 campaign for President. The video, "Wassup 2008" was posted to YouTube in October 2008 and received over 1.8 million views.

Additionally, Shane and his wife Lydia Hurlbut started the Hurlbut Academy, an online educational platform and mentoring community dedicated to helping filmmakers become better artists. The Hurlbut Academy will rebrand to the Filmmakers Academy in 2022.

In the fourth quarter of 2021, Shane and Lydia announced the Filmmakers Academy. Along with Cinematography, new courses include "Unscripted Camera Operating: The Playbook" (taught by Sherri Kauk), "Commercial Directing" (taught by Jordan Brady), "How to be a camera assistant" (taught by Derek Edwards), "How to be a DIT" (taught by Derek Johnson), and "How to be a MOVI Tech" (taught by Chris Herr). The Hurlbut Academy will cease operations at 00:00 January 31, 2022 to allow Shane and Lydia to fully focus on the Filmmakers Academy.

== Christian Bale incident ==
In 2008, Hurlbut again worked with director McG, as director of photography on the film Terminator Salvation. During shooting for the film in July 2008, Hurlbut was the victim of a profane tirade from actor Christian Bale, who scolded Hurlbut for walking into a scene involving Bale and actress Bryce Dallas Howard. Hurlbut responded calmly and apologized several times to Bale, and continued shooting for seven hours after the incident. On February 6, 2009, Bale told KROQ-FM radio that he and Hurlbut talked after the incident and "resolved this completely." Bale acknowledged the two worked together for several hours after the incident, and "at least a month after that", and noted "I've seen a rough cut of the movie and he has done a wonderful job. It looks fantastic."

== Filmography ==
=== Film ===
Year	Title	Director
2000	The Skulls	Rob Cohen
2001	Crazy/Beautiful	John Stockwell
2002	Drumline	Charles Stone III
2003	11:14	Greg Marcks
2004	Mr. 3000	Charles Stone III
2005	Into the Blue	John Stockwell
2005	The Greatest Game Ever Played	Bill Paxton
2006	Something New	Sanaa Hamri
2006	Waist Deep	Vondie Curtis-Hall
2006	We Are Marshall	McG
2008	Semi-Pro	Kent Alterman
2008	Swing Vote	Joshua Michael Stern
2009	Terminator Salvation	McG
2012	Act of Valor	Mike McCoy; Scott Waugh
2012	Deadfall	Stefan Ruzowitzky
2014	Need for Speed	Scott Waugh
2015	Fathers and Daughters	Gabriele Muccino
2017	The Adventurers	Stephen Fung
2017	The Babysitter	McG
2018	There's No Place Like Home	Gabriele Muccino
2019	Rim of the World	McG
2020	Holidate	John Whitesell
2020	Safety	Reginald Hudlin
2021	Love Hard	Hernán Jiménez
2022	Tall Girl 2	Emily Ting
2024	Música	Rudy Mancuso
2026	Way of the Warrior Kid	McG
2026	Clashing Through the Snow	Carlson Young

=== Television ===
TV movies

Year	Title	Director	Notes
1997	The Guardian	Rob Cohen	
1998	The Rat Pack	Rob Cohen	Nominated- ASC Award for Outstanding Achievement in Cinematography

TV series

Year	Title	Director	Notes
2015	Into the Badlands	David Dobkin; Guy Ferland	6 episodes
2021	Resident Alien	David Dobkin	Episode "Pilot"
2024	The Perfect Couple	Susanne Bier	Miniseries
