= Jethro Wood =

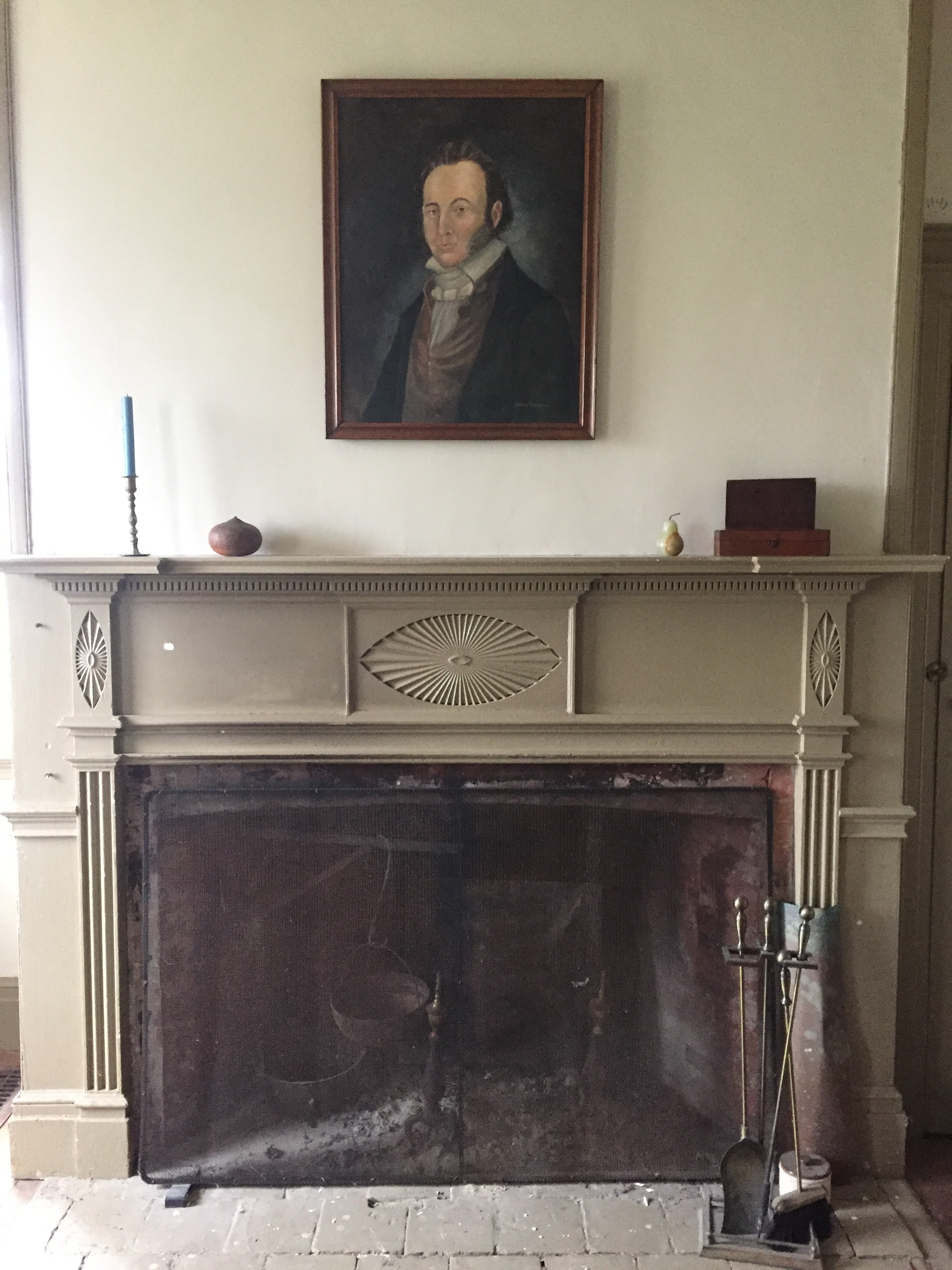

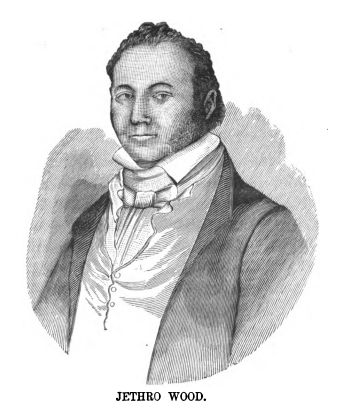

Jethro Wood (March 16, 1774 – 1834) was the inventor of a cast-iron moldboard plow with replaceable parts, the first commercially successful iron moldboard plow. His invention accelerated the development of American agriculture in the antebellum period. By simplifying and strengthening the plow design and adding interchangeable parts, Wood's plow broadened accessibility and eased replacements of plows in 19th century America. Wood was also responsible for notable changes in early American patent laws following patent infringements on his plow design.

== Early life ==
Jethro Wood was born on March 16, 1774 in Dartmouth, Massachusetts. His parents were John Wood and Dinah Hussey. His family was Quaker, both of his parents being a part of the Society of Friends, and Wood remained Quaker throughout his life, but was not particularly doctrinaire. He was born as the only son alongside five or six sisters. His family was from relative wealth, his father being an early settler to the area and having established himself as one of the community's leaders, he was afforded a generous education accompanied with a library and workshop with which to feed his passion.

According to one account of Wood's childhood:

Once, while still very young, he had shaped a small plow out of metal, not dissimilar to the model which was later to form the basis for modern agriculture. But not satisfied with the mere making of it, and wishing to see it in operation, he fashioned a harness of corresponding size and fastened the family cat to his plow. The protests of the cat attracted the immediate attention of paternal authority, and the future inventor was soundly thrashed for his precocity.

It was in his youth when Wood would first begin his correspondence with Thomas Jefferson regarding their innovations, designs, and progress in new plows. Upon his father's death, Wood inherited a small fortune with which he would pursue his inventions and patents.

== Adulthood ==
Wood spent his adult life in Cayuga County, New York, near Scipio. On January 1, 1793, Wood married Sylvia Howland of White Creek, New York; they had six children together. Following the lead of his parents, Wood would join the Society of Friends, becoming a consistent member.

=== Moldboard plow ===
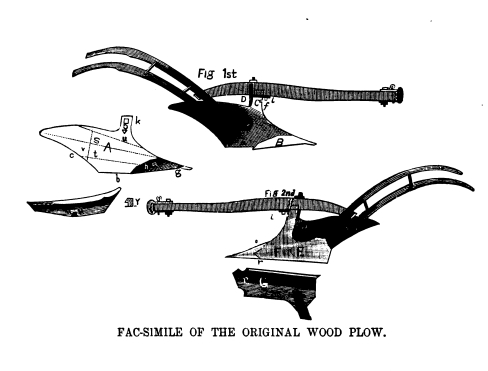
"Facsimile of the original Wood plow", from an 1882 biography.

Wood received a patent on an initial version of a cast-iron moldboard plow in 1814, which improved upon previous designs by utilizing interchangeable parts that allowed for convenient repairs and connected the parts without the use of screws or bolts. It was designed as three separate parts, share, moldboard, and landside that could be replaced individually. In 1815, Wood contacted Moses Brown, an Early American Industrialist, to assist in promoting the plow in Rhode Island. He then sent the plow on to Thomas Jefferson in 1816, who praised the design. Later on, in 1819, he patented a second plow which more closely matched his ambitions for the project. The 1819 patent was the 19th patent issued for a plow in the United States.

Other than Wood, inventors like Thomas Jefferson and John Deere each invented cast-iron plows which moved the agricultural standard away from wooden plows, improving durability. The first of these, however, was patented by Charles Newbold of New Jersey in 1793. During the development of the plow, he corresponded with Thomas Jefferson, who had been working on an improvement to the plow along slightly different lines.

A test of the 1819 model showed that it could plow a stony field without breaking. In an attempt to attract further attention, Wood endeavored to send his new plow to the then Czar of Russia, who upon receiving it, sent back a diamond ring, which mistakenly went into the possession of Dr. Samuel Mitchell, a friend of Wood’s who had been asked to write the letter accompanying the plow in French as Wood was not as well versed in the language. It was highly successful in the eastern United States, but less effective against the clay soils and sod of the Midwest.

After the invention of the plow, much of Wood's time and money were consumed by pursuing patent infringement suits against small manufacturers around the country who had copied his design. Wood spent a considerable portion of his later life dedicated to hunting down these copies. One of those suits, Ex parte Wood, reached the Supreme Court after a district court ruled in favor of Jethro Wood and asked Charles Wood and Gilbert Brundage to repeal their patent. After an appeal, the Supreme Court ruled that district court judges may repeal a patent in the event that the patent holder could not provide sufficient reason for the patent to exist and that Congress may grant patents for a limited time and guarantees citizens a jury trial in cases where the amount in dispute exceeds $20.

Wood died in poverty on September 28, 1834. He had spent his entire "large fortune" on perfecting his invention and litigating the patent, and had earned less than $550 in total from his invention.

Wood's patent was renewed in 1833 by act of Congress, and his children continued to fight against infringements and campaign for changes to the patent law for some years.

== Legacy ==
Jethro Wood's plow design was later supplanted by the further improvements of John Deere, who furnished the plow with polished plowshares that enabled it to break up prairie sod.

After his death, Wood’s son, Benjamin Wood continued his battles against copy patents, working with Clay, Webster, and John Adams and securing a reform to the US patent laws. Not long after Benjamin’s death, two of Jethro Wood’s daughters took up the cause in pursuing recompense after their brother's death for the copied patent, continuing communications with the John Adams and the Adams Family.

The Jethro Wood House, Wood's residence in Poplar Ridge, New York, was built in 1805 and declared a National Historic Landmark in 1964. Current owners: Thomas Hoppel and his partner have extensively renovated and upgraded and it is currently a private residence.

== Works cited ==
- Wilson, James Grant; Fiske, John, eds. (1918). "Wood, Jethro". Appleton's cyclopædia of American biography. Vol. 8. pp. 174–176.
- Gilbert, Frank (1882). Jethro Wood, Inventor of the Modern Plow. Chicago: Rhodes & McClure.
