= Augustus Howland House =

Historic house in New York, United States

- U.S. National Register of Historic Places
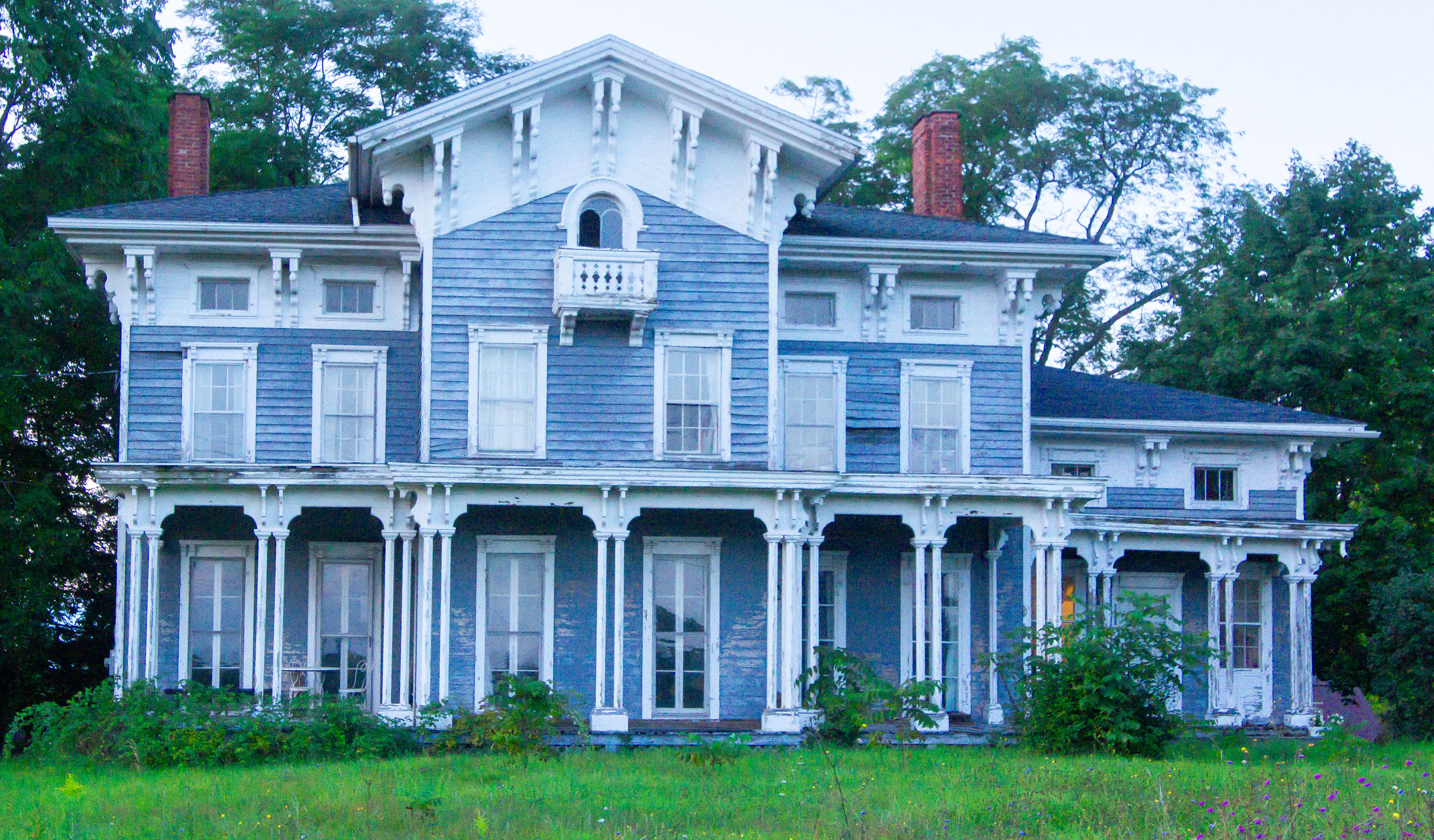

- Location within New York Location within the United States
- Location: 1395 Sherwood Road, Sherwood, New York
- Coordinates: 42°45′37.08″N 76°38′50.99″W
- Area: 191.2 acres (0.774 km^{2})
- Built: c.1850
- Architectural style: Italianate
- NRHP reference No.: 08000448
- Added to NRHP: May 20, 2008; 18 years ago

Augustus Howland House is a historic home located at 1395 Sherwood Road in Sherwood in Cayuga County, New York. It is a "distinctive high-style Italianate" dwelling built about 1850. It is a 2 1/2-story, six bays wide and three bays deep, heavy timber frame dwelling, topped by a low pitched hipped roof. It is sheathed in clapboard and features a two bay wide front pavilion. Included in the listing are four contributing barns (on the south side of Sherwood Road), a laundry building, and two hitching posts.

The Howlands were Quakers, and Augustus Howland donated land for the nearby North Street Friends Meetinghouse.

It was listed on the National Register of Historic Places in 2008.
