= Southern Cayuga High School =

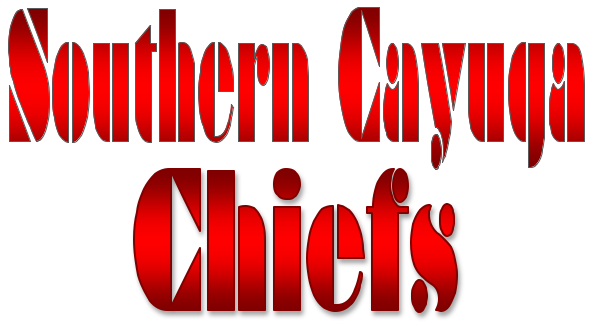

Location
- 2384 Route 43B; Aurora, New York 13026; United States; 42°44′3″N 76°36′56″W

Information
- Type: Public
- School district: Southern Cayuga Central School District
- NCES School ID: 362757003749
- Principal: Luke Carnicelli
- Teaching staff: 31.50 (on an FTE basis)
- Grades: 7-12
- Enrollment: 297 (2021-2022)
- Student to teacher ratio: 9.43
- Campus: Rural: Distant
- Colors: Red and White
- Mascot: Falcons
- Yearbook: Chieftain
- Website: www.southerncayuga.org/648

Southern Cayuga High School is a secondary school (grades 7–12) in Poplar Ridge, Cayuga County, New York.

SCHS is operated by Southern Cayuga Central School District.

In 2003 it had some 585 students and 45 teachers. The student body was 98% white, and 24% were eligible for free lunch, higher than the state average of 15%. Its New York State School Report Card reports that it exceeded all three required standards (graduation in English and Mathematics, and dropout rate) in 2001.

The school's student-produced newspaper is called The Source, and is associated with a one-semester journalism class.

Southern Cayuga is one of eleven places in the United States that will receive a sapling from the tree outside of Anne Frank's house.

As of 2012, the school has moved to one campus, and Emily Howland Elementary is going to be auctioned off.

== Selected former principals ==
Previous assignment and reason for departure denoted in parentheses

- Ms. Mimi Trudeau ?-2002
- Mr. James De Rusha–2002-2003
- Mr. Dennis Farnsworth–2003-2005
- Mrs. Karen Simon–2005-2006(Principal - Southern Cayuga Middle School, named Assistant Principal of North Street Elementary School)
