= Best Sports Movie ESPY Award =

Annual award (2002–2011)

- Awarded for: best sports film
- Location: Los Angeles (2011)
- Presented by: ESPN
- First award: 2002
- Final award: 2011
- Currently held by: The Fighter (USA)
- Website: www.espn.co.uk/espys/

The Best Sports Movie ESPY Award was an annual award honoring the achievements of an individual from the world of sports film making. It was first awarded as part of the ESPY Awards in 2002, and was discontinued nine years later. The Best Sports Movie ESPY Award trophy, designed by sculptor Lawrence Nowlan, was bestowed annually to the sports film adjudged to be the best in a given calendar year. From 2004 onward, the winner was chosen by online voting through choices selected by the ESPN Select Nominating Committee. Before that, determination of the winners was made by an panel of experts. Through the 2001 iteration of the ESPY Awards, ceremonies were conducted in February of each year to honor achievements over the previous calendar year; awards presented thereafter are conferred in July and reflect performance from the June previous. (Note: Because of the rescheduling of the ESPY Awards ceremony, the award presented in 2002 was given in consideration of performance betwixt February 2001 and June 2002.)

The inaugural winner of the Best Sports Movie ESPY Award in 2002 was the baseball themed film The Rookie released the same year. It is based on the true story of Jim Morris' minor but notable Major League Baseball career. Films that predominantly feature American football have received the award more than any other sport, with three wins and six further nominations, followed by baseball and basketball with two victories apiece, and were nominated twice. John Lee Hancock is the director who holds more victories than any one else, one for The Rookie, and a second for The Blind Side (2010). The two sports with the most nominations that did not win the award are golf and horse racing, with three each. The final winner of the Best Sports Movie ESPY Award in 2011 was the Boxing film The Fighter, which centers on the lives of former professional boxers Micky Ward and Dicky Eklund, and the issues they are confronted with in both their personal and professional lives.

== Winners ==
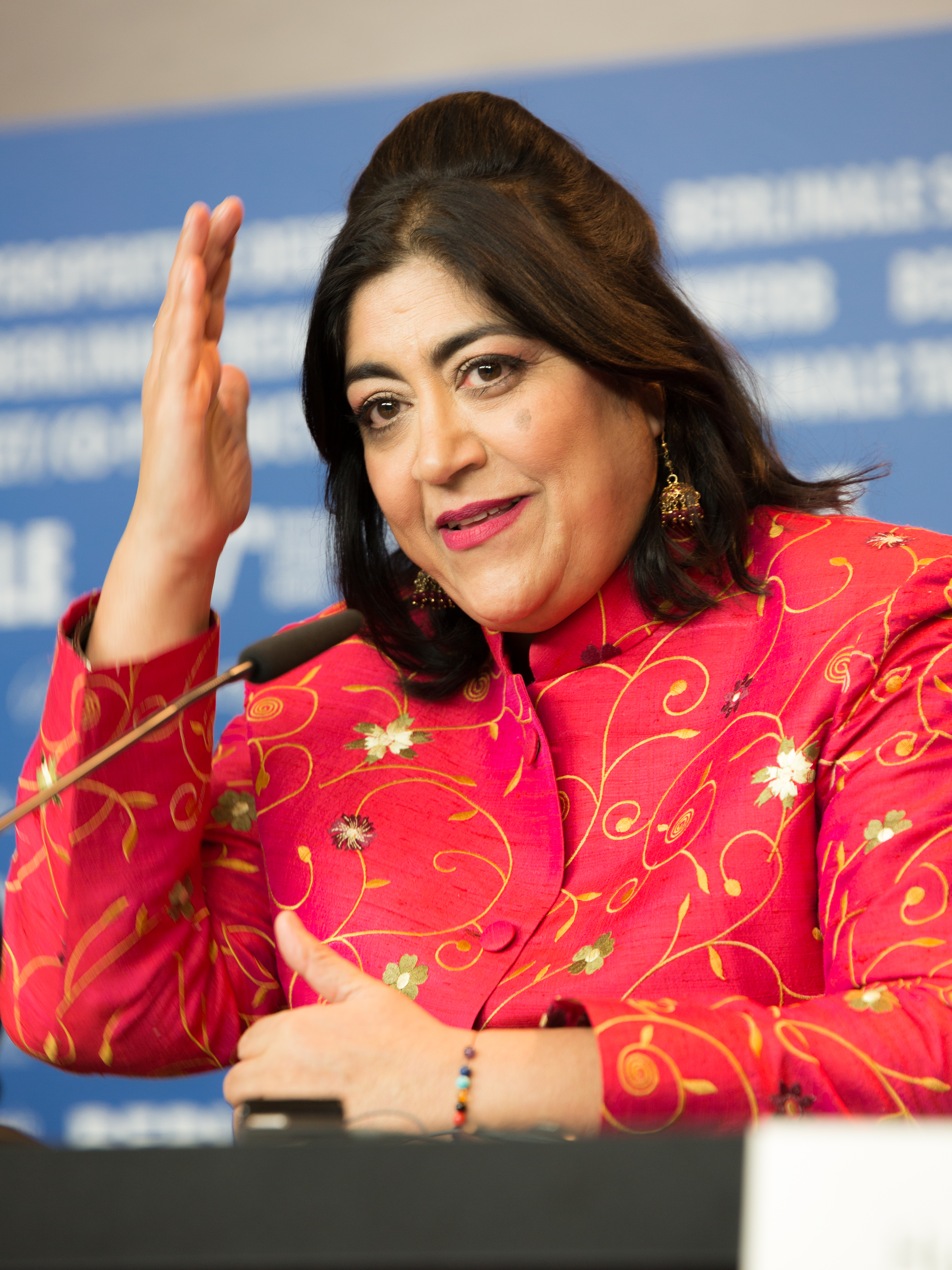
Gurinder Chadha's film Bend It Like Beckham was the only soccer film to win the award in 2003.

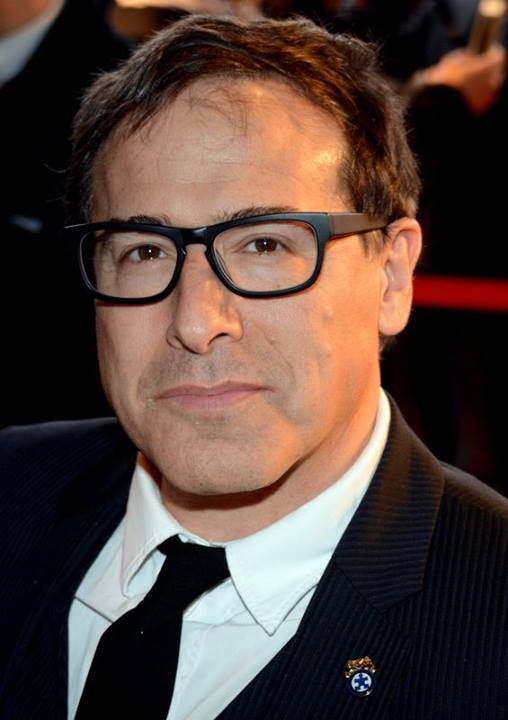
In 2011, The Fighter, directed by David O. Russell, was the final film to be voted the winner of the award.

Best Sports Movie ESPY Award winners and nominees
Year	Film	Director	Sport featured	Nominees	Refs
2002	The Rookie	John Lee Hancock	Baseball	61* – Baseball; Ali – Boxing; Joe and Max – Boxing; Monday Night Mayhem – American football	
2003	Bend It Like Beckham	Gurinder Chadha	Association football (soccer)	A Gentleman's Game – Golf; Like Mike – Basketball; Poolhall Junkies – Pool; The Junction Boys – College football	
2004	Miracle	Gavin O'Connor	Ice hockey	Bobby Jones: Stroke of Genius – Golf; DodgeBall: A True Underdog Story – Dodgeball; Radio – American football Seabiscuit – Horse racing	
2005	Friday Night Lights	Peter Berg	American football	Cinderella Man – Boxing; Coach Carter – Basketball; Million Dollar Baby – Boxing	
2006	Glory Road	James Gartner	Basketball	Dreamer – Horse racing Four Minutes – Track and field The Greatest Game Ever Played – Golf	
2007	Talladega Nights: The Ballad of Ricky Bobby	Adam McKay	Stock car racing	Invincible American football Pride – Swimming; We Are Marshall – American football	
2008	Semi-Pro	Kent Alterman	Basketball	The Game Plan – American football Leatherheads – American football Resurrecting the Champ – Boxing	
2009	The Express: The Ernie Davis Story	Gary Fleder	American football	Sugar – Baseball; The Wrestler – Pro Wrestling	
2010	The Blind Side	John Lee Hancock	American football	Big Fan – American Football; The Damned United – Soccer; Invictus – Rugby union The Karate Kid – Martial arts	
2011	The Fighter	David O. Russell	Boxing	Secretariat – Horse racing Soul Surfer – Surfing; Win Win – Wrestling	

== See also ==
- List of film awards
