= Job and Deborah Otis House =

Historic house in New York, United States

- U.S. National Register of Historic Places
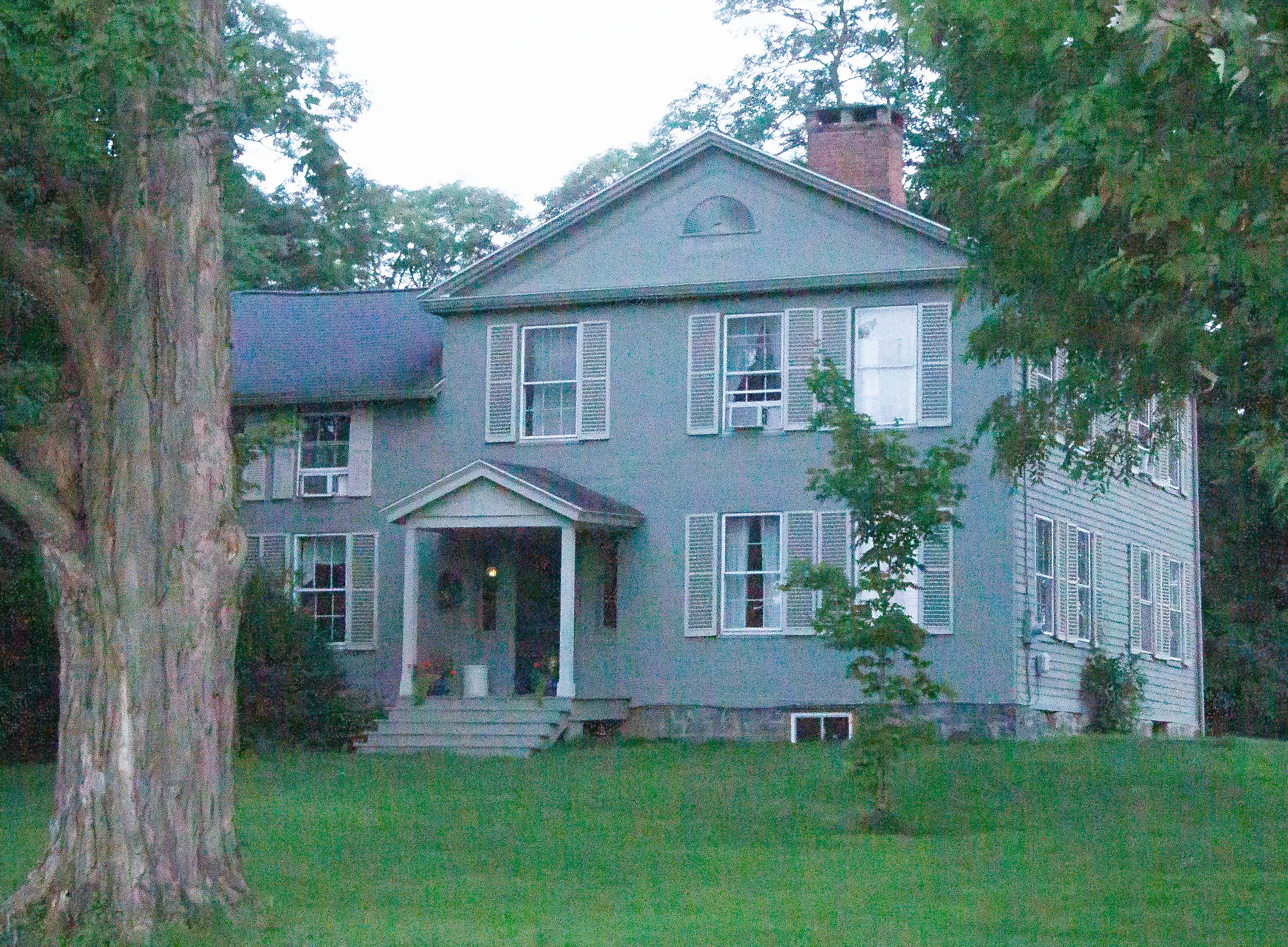

- Location within New York Location within the United States
- Nearest city: Sherwood, New York
- Coordinates: 42.76081°N 76.61515°W
- Area: 4.5 acres (1.8 ha)
- Built: 1815
- Architectural style: Federal
- MPS: Freedom Trail, Abolitionism, and African American Life in Central New York MPS
- NRHP reference No.: 08000468
- Added to NRHP: May 29, 2008

Job and Deborah Otis House, also known as East Otis Farm, is a historic home located at Sherwood in Cayuga County, New York. It is a Federal-style dwelling built in 1796. It consists of a 2-story, three-bay, side-hall main block with a 1 1/2-story side ell. Also on the property is a mid- to late-19th-century carriage house, now converted into a two car garage. During the 1840s the dwelling was home to Job and Deborah Otis, who were Orthodox Quakers and leaders of the Otisites. Their granddaughter was the painter Amy Otis.

It was listed on the National Register of Historic Places in 2008.
