= Ex parte Wood =

- Supreme Court of the United States

Argued March 11, 1824 Decided March 17, 1824
- Full case name: Ex parte Wood and Brundage
- Citations: 22 U.S. 603 (more) 9 Wheat. 603; 6 L. Ed. 171; 1824 U.S. LEXIS 401

Case history
- Subsequent: None

Holding
- A patent cannot be invalidated based on summary proceedings.

Court membership
- Chief Justice John Marshall Associate Justices Bushrod Washington · William Johnson; Thomas Todd · Gabriel Duvall; Joseph Story · Smith Thompson

Case opinion
- Majority: Story, joined by unanimous

Laws applied
- Patent Act of 1793)

Ex parte Wood, 22 U.S. (9 Wheat.) 603 (1824), was a United States Supreme Court case in which the Court held that a patent could not be repealed based on summary proceedings without the opportunity for a jury trial. The case exemplifies a tradition in early 19th century United States patent caselaw in which patents were regarded specifically as an absolute property right to exclusive use of the invention, rather than requiring a balancing between public and private interests.

== Background ==
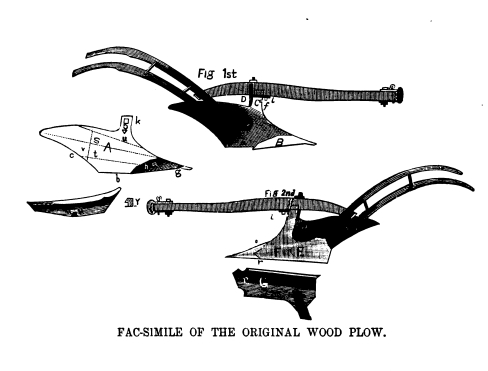
Jethro Wood's moldboard plow.

In 1819, Jethro Wood patented a cast-iron moldboard plow with replaceable parts, which revolutionized American agriculture and laid the foundation for the later John Deere plow. His patent issued on September 1, 1819. But despite his invention's success, and although he was born to a wealthy Quaker family, he would die impoverished in 1834, having exhausted his funds on patent infringement suits.

Among those suits was the action at issue here, in which Wood brought suit against Charles Wood and Gilbert Brundage in the Southern District of New York to invalidate their later patent on a similar plow, which had been issued on November 9, 1820. (Because of the Patent Office fire of 1836, the actual patents at issue here are not extant.) The Patent Act of 1793 allowed a suit for invalidity to be brought within three years of the contested patent being issued.

The district court issued a rule nisi, ordering Charles Wood and Gilbert Brundage to appear and show cause why their patent should not be invalidated. They did so, but their arguments were not satisfactory to the court, which ordered the patent repealed immediately by a rule absolute. They moved for a scire facias proceeding, to have a jury trial on the validity of their patent, but the judge denied their motion.

Charles Wood and Gilbert Brundage then petitioned the Supreme Court for a writ of mandamus to require the district court to issue a scire facias and try the question by jury.

== Opinion of the Court ==
The principal language at issue was section 10 of the Patent Act of 1793:

That upon oath or affirmation being made, before the judge of the district court, where the patentee, his executors, administrators or assigns reside, that any patent, which shall be issued in pursuance of this act, was obtained surreptitiously, or upon false suggestion, and motion made to the said court, within three years after issuing the said patent, but not afterwards, it shall and may be lawful for the judge of the said district court, if the matter alleged shall appear to him to be sufficient, to grant a rule, that the patentee, or his executor, administrator or assign show cause, why process should not issue against him to repeal such patent. And if sufficient cause shall not be shown to the contrary, the rule shall be made absolute, and thereupon the said judge shall order process to be issued against such patentee, or his executors, administrators or assigns, with costs of suit. And in case no sufficient cause shall be shown to the contrary, or if it shall appear that the patentee was not the true inventor or discoverer, judgment shall be rendered by such court for the repeal of such patent; and if the party, at whose complaint, the process issued, shall have judgment given against him, he shall pay all such costs, as the defendant shall be put to, in defending the suit, to be taxed by the court, and recovered in due course of law.

The issue before the Supreme Court was whether the "process" that the statute described being issued after the summary proceedings was simply a process to repeal the patent, or a process for a jury trial (or bench trial if the issue was a question of law rather than fact). Justice Story held that the process had to be for a jury trial. In so doing, he relied heavily on the importance of the patent as a property right, requiring due process of law before it can be taken away, and on the importance of jury trials in the Anglo-American system. He reasoned that even if it might be constitutional for Congress to allow patents to be revoked by summary proceedings, that could not be assumed to be the case unless it was spelled out in the statute.

Wrote Justice Story:

The securing to inventors of an exclusive right to their inventions, was deemed of so much importance, as a means of promoting the progress of science and the useful arts, that the constitution has expressly delegated to Congress the power to secure such rights to them for a limited period. The inventor has, during this period, a property in his inventions; a property which is often of very great value, and of which the law intended to give him the absolute enjoyment and possession. In suits at common law, where the value in controversy exceeds 20 dollars, the constitution has secured to the citizens a trial by jury. [....] It is not lightly to be presumed, therefore, that Congress, in a class of cases placed peculiarly within its patronage and protection, involving some of the dearest and most valuable rights which society acknowledges, and the constitution itself means to favour, would institute a new and summary process, which should finally adjudge upon those rights, without a trial by jury, without a right of appeal, and without any of those guards with which, in equity suits, it has fenced round the general administration of justice.

Even if the statute was ambiguous, therefore, that ambiguity could not support eliminating the jury trial right on questions of patent validity. However, on close reading of the statute Justice Story found it was not ambiguous, because the phrase regarding the "process" was followed by another about a subsequent judgment: "in case no sufficient cause shall be shown to the contrary, or if it shall appear that the patentee was not the true inventor or discoverer, judgment shall be rendered by such Court for the repeal of the patent." Thus, Justice Story reasoned, Congress could not have intended the initial show-cause proceedings to allow for the summary invalidation of the patent; this invalidation could take place only after a proper trial.

The Supreme Court therefore granted Wood and Brundage's petition, and ordered the trial court to issue a scire facias for a trial on whether their patent was valid.

== Subsequent developments ==
The specific statutory interpretation performed by Justice Story became obsolete when the Patent Act of 1836 took effect, Ex parte Wood has never been cited in a Supreme Court opinion. It has however resurfaced in recent debates over the jury trial right in patent cases. In the 1995 case of In re Lockwood, the Federal Circuit used it to distinguish invalidity proceedings from inequitable conduct proceedings, arguing that the proceedings under section 10 of the Patent Act of 1793 were more similar to proceedings of the inequitable conduct kind, and therefore the jury-trial right did not extend to modern invalidity proceedings.

In 2005, the case was cited in Judge Pauline Newman's dissent in the Federal Circuit case of In re Tech. Licensing Corp., where the court eliminated the right to a jury trial when the validity of patent claims is at issue. She also cited it in 2006 in her dissent on a similar issue in Agfa Corp. v. Creo Products Inc.
