= Long Point State Park – Finger Lakes =

State park in Cayuga County, New York

Long Point State Park
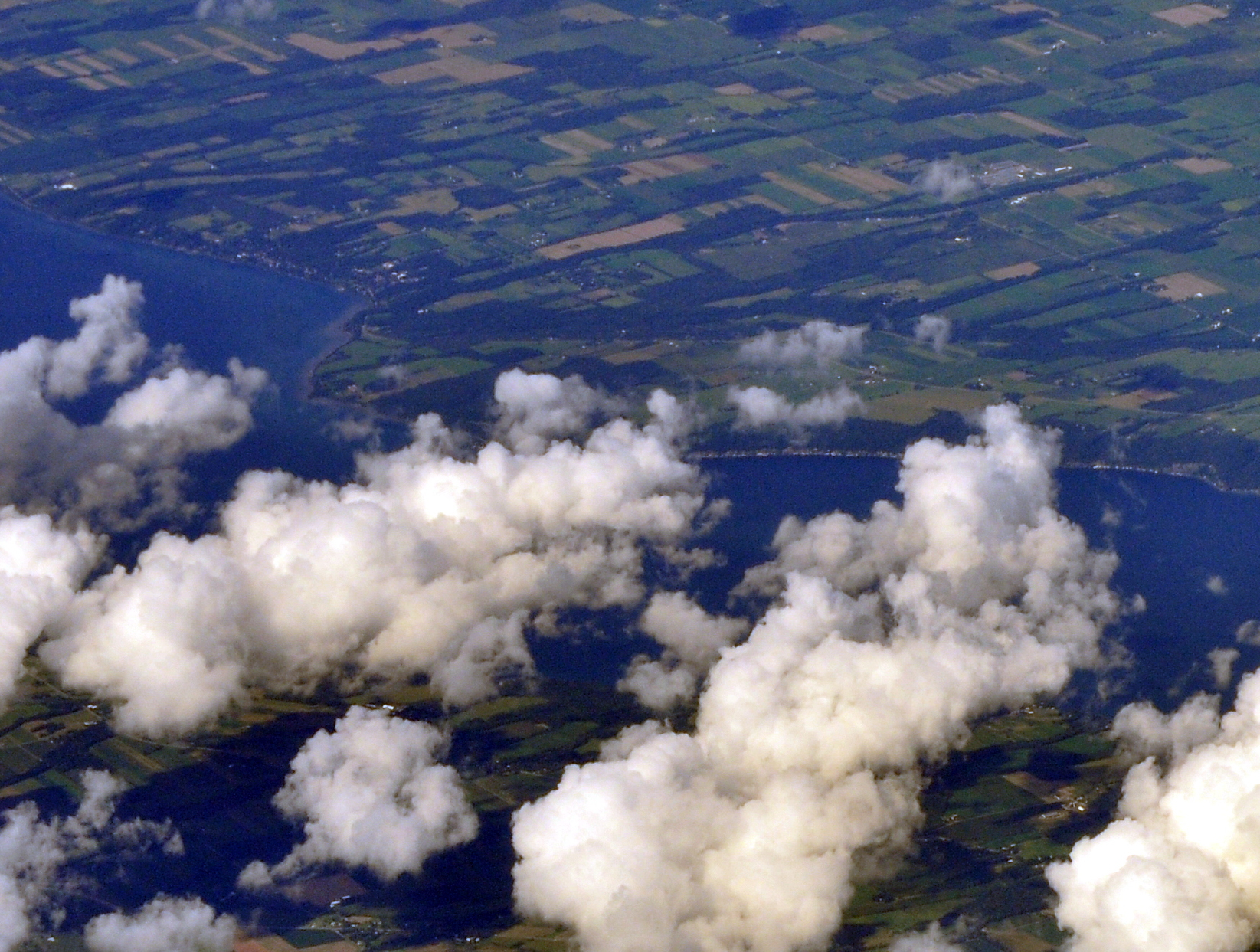
- Aerial view of Long Point State Park and environs from the southwest, 2013. The eponymous point of the park can be seen on the far shore of the lake left of center, just above the clouds.

- Location within New York
- Type: State park
- Location: 2063 Lake Road; Aurora, New York
- Coordinates: 42°42′52″N 76°42′30″W
- Area: 297 acres (1.20 km^{2})
- Operator: New York State Office of Parks, Recreation and Historic Preservation
- Visitors: 32,798 (in 2014)
- Open: All year
- Website: Long Point State Park State Park

Long Point State Park (in the Finger Lakes) is a 297-acre (1.20 km^{2}) state park located on the east shore of Cayuga Lake. The park is in the Town of Ledyard in Cayuga County, New York.

== Park description ==
The park offers a playground, picnic tables, hunting, fishing, hiking and a boat launch. A cottage is available for rent along the lake's shore. There is a $7 fee to park a car or launch a boat.

=== Long Point State Park trail system ===
In the Fall of 2013, community volunteers, with the approval of the New York State Office of Parks, Recreation and Historic Preservation, developed a new trail system on the east side of New York Route 90, which divides the formerly undeveloped inland section of the park from the waterfront section. The new trail system features secluded picnic tables and hilltop views of Cayuga Lake. A section of the trail system runs along the top of a small gorge.

== See also ==
- List of New York state parks
