= Jethro Wood House =

Historic house in New York, United States

- U.S. National Register of Historic Places
- U.S. National Historic Landmark
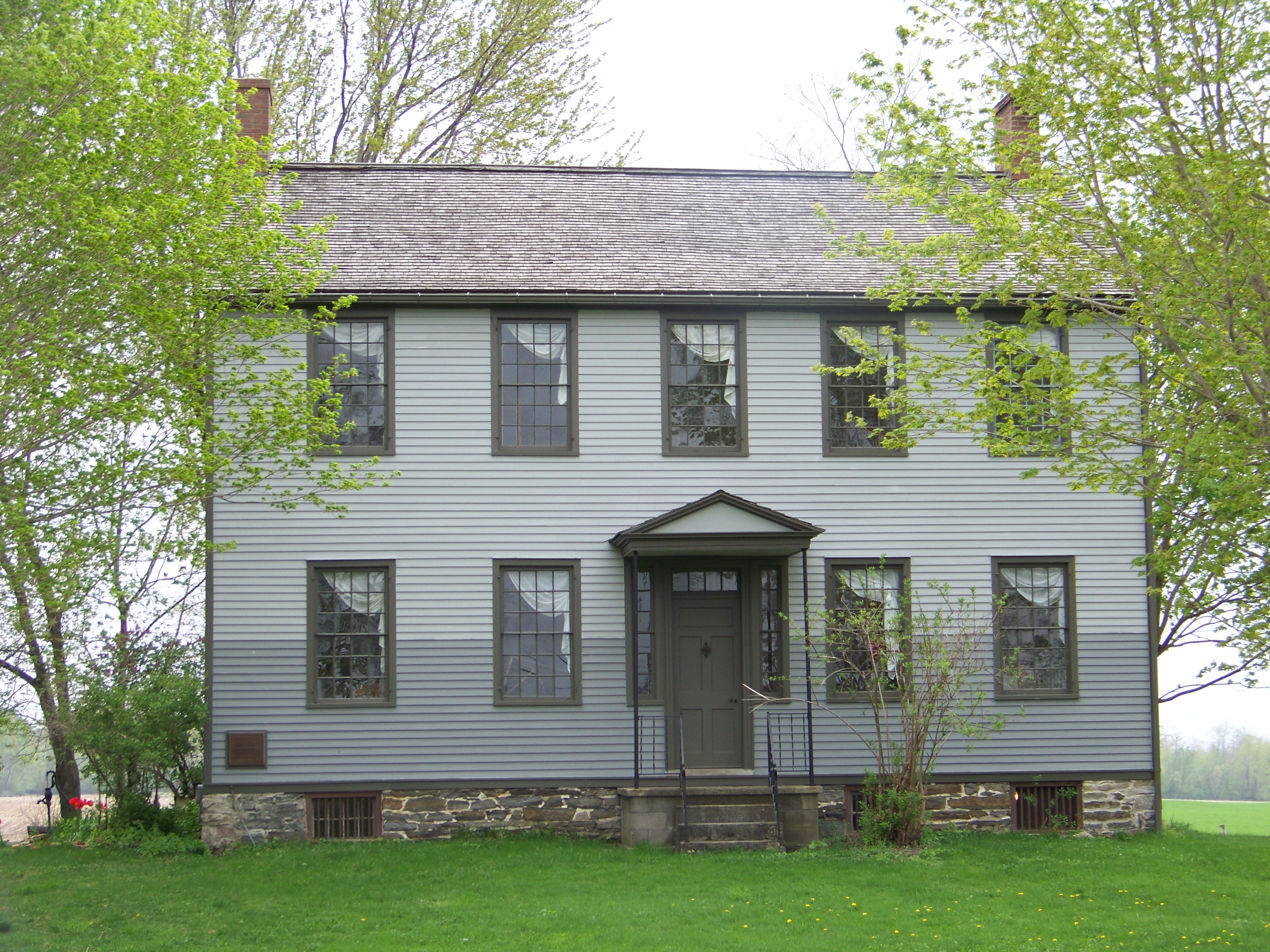

- Location within New York Location within the United States
- Location: Poplar Ridge Road, Ledyard, New York
- Coordinates: 42°44′15.21″N 76°37′57.33″W
- Area: less than two acres
- Built: Before 1800
- NRHP reference No.: 66000505

Significant dates
- Added to NRHP: October 15, 1966
- Designated NHL: July 19, 1964

The Jethro Wood House is a historic house on Poplar Ridge Road, in a rural area west of the hamlet of Poplar Ridge in the town of Ledyard, New York. Built by 1800, it was the home of inventor Jethro Wood (1774–1834), whose 1819 invention of an iron moldboard plow revolutionized American agriculture. The house was declared a National Historic Landmark in 1964.

It is a private residence, and is not normally open to the public.

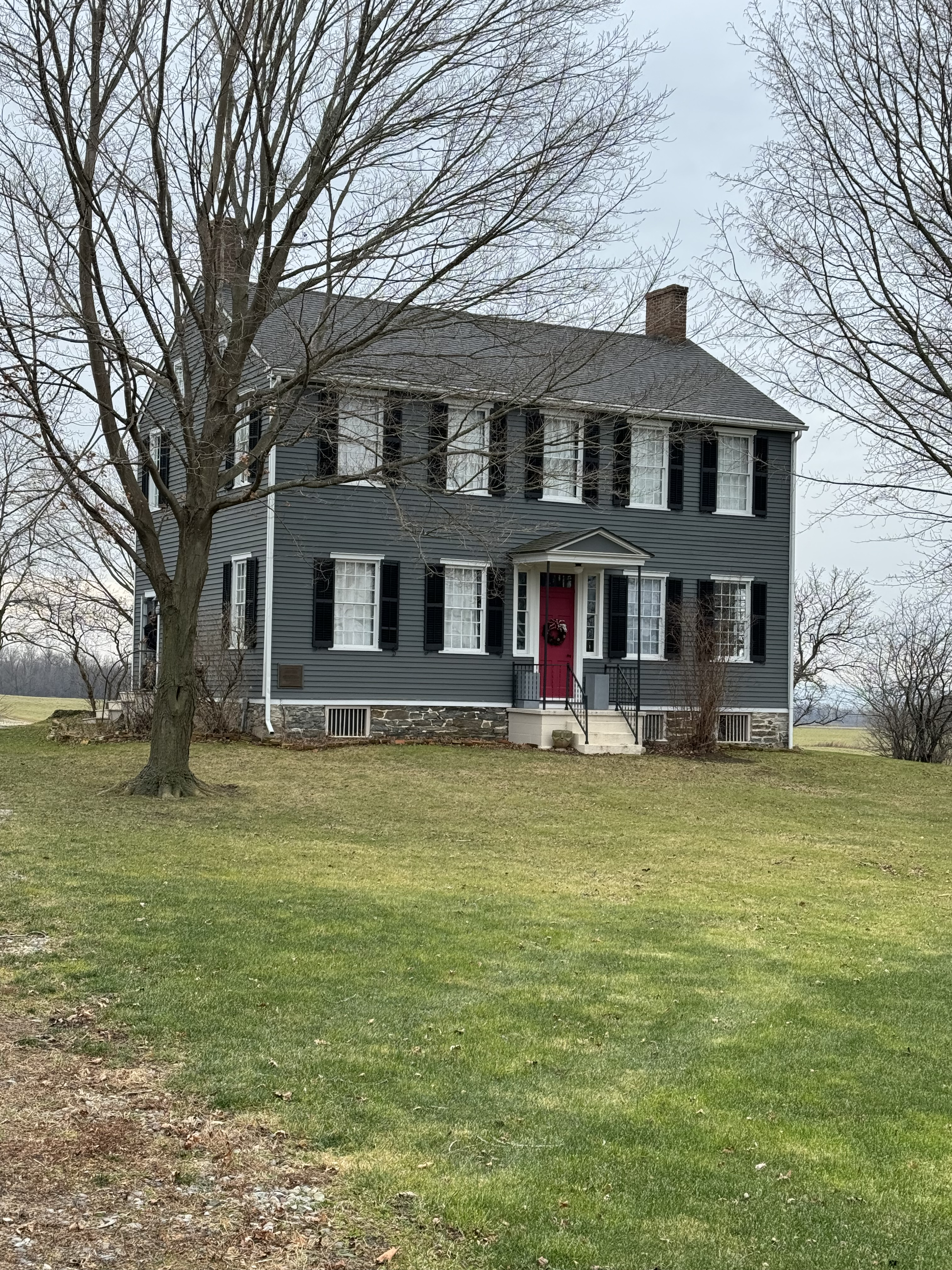

== Description and history ==
The Jethro Wood House is located on the south side of Poplar Ridge Road, west of the village center of Poplar Ridge in Ledyard, New York. It is a large 2 1/2-story wood-frame structure, with a gabled roof and clapboarded exterior. It has a five-bay front facade, with sash windows arranged symmetrically around the main entrance. The entrance is sheltered by a gable-roof portico supported by metal fixtures, and is framed by sidelight and transom windows.

The house was purchased about 1800 by Jethro Wood, who grew up in Washington County, New York and engaged in farming when he moved here. In 1814 he was granted the first patent for a cast-iron plow with replaceable parts, improving on extant single-piece plows. This first effort was not a commercial success, but in 1819 he was awarded a second patent which was. His improvements made it possible for farmers to more rapidly prepare land for planting, enabling them to work more land.

Jethro Wood was also the area's first postmaster. His wife, Sylvia Howland, was the aunt of Emily Howland, an active abolitionist, philanthropist, and educator. He spent his earnings fighting patent infringements. When he died in 1834, his children tried in vain to carry on his efforts at obtaining a renewed patent.

Thomas Hoppel, the current owner, extensively renovated the house in 2020, both inside and out, and a porch was added to resemble a previous addition in the back of the house. Many of the original features of the house remain in place including two fireplace mantels, the original doors and the front staircase. The large original key to the front door still operates the lock. The door is painted red which was a symbol that the house was a welcoming place along the underground railroad. There is no evidence that the house was part of the Underground Railroad, but the railroad was very active in places close by, including the hamlet of Sherwood. A new large barn was erected in 2021 which is historically accurate to the barns in the area. There is an oil portrait of Jethro Wood and many artifacts, including an original cast iron plow.

== Gallery ==
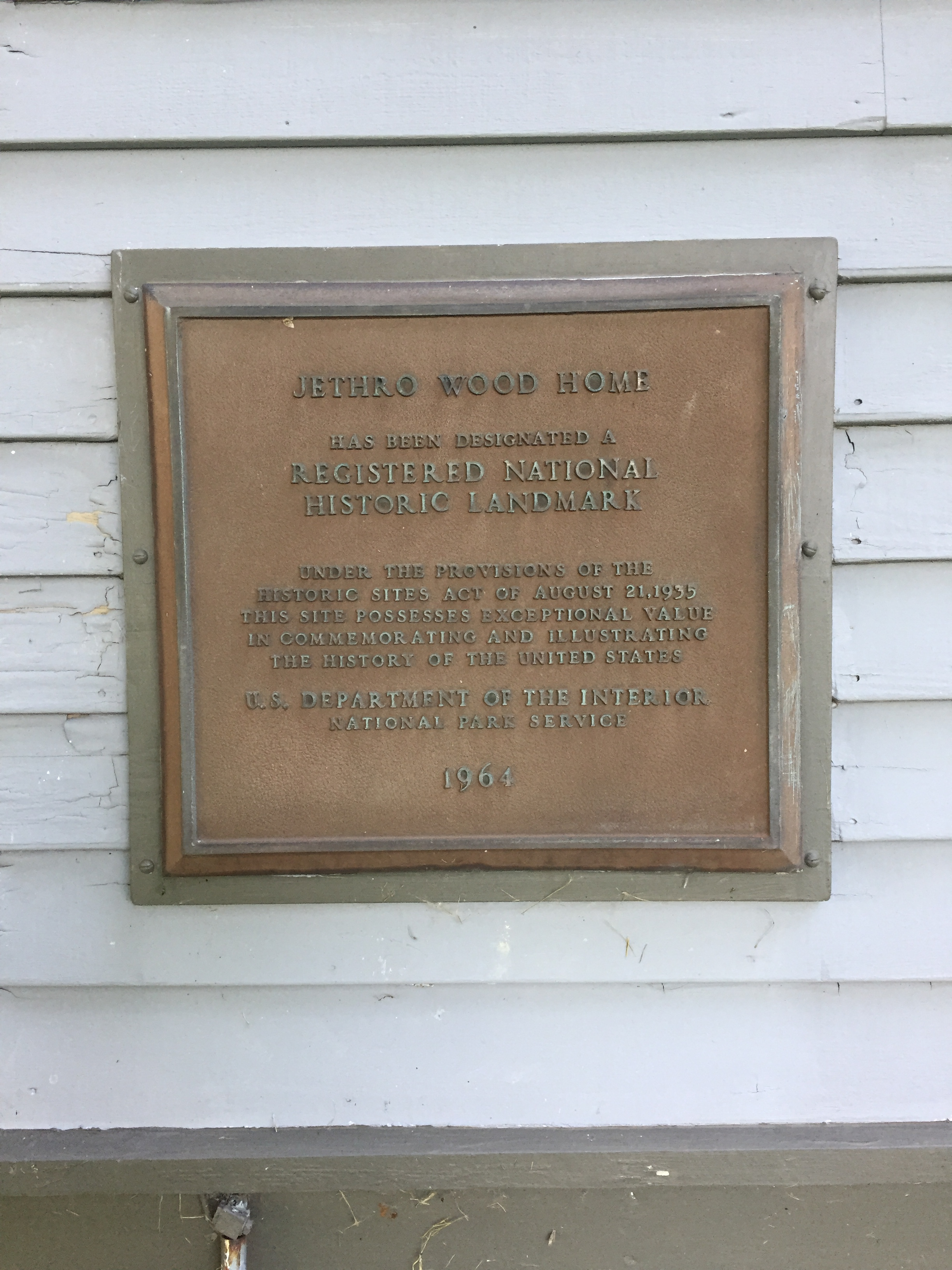
Jethro Wood House, National Historic Landmark plaque

== See also ==
- List of National Historic Landmarks in New York
- National Register of Historic Places listings in Cayuga County, New York
