= Molly Luce =

American painter (1896-1986)

- Born: December 18, 1896; Pittsburgh, Pennsylvania, U.S.
- Died: April 16, 1986 (aged 89); Little Compton, Rhode Island, U.S.
- Education: Wheaton College; Art Student League of New York
- Known for: Painting

Molly Luce (December 18, 1896 – April 16, 1986) was an American painter.

== Biography ==
Born Marian Clark Luce in Pittsburgh, Luce grew up in Bethlehem, Pennsylvania, and in Plainfield and Glen Ridge, New Jersey, summering in Kingsville, Ohio. with her grandparents. She claimed that the first painting to affect her was The Horse Fair by Rosa Bonheur. She studied art at Wheaton College under Amy Otis, earning an associate degree in 1916. Further study followed at the Art Students League of New York under F. Luis Mora, George Bellows, and Kenneth Hayes Miller.

At the completion of her schooling in 1922–23, Luce traveled Europe, visiting France, Switzerland and Italy. Upon her return in 1924 she exhibited at the Whitney Studio Club; she would show work there and at its successor organization, the Whitney Museum of American Art, in the annual and biennial exhibitions up to 1950. She was one of the painters included in the Whitney Traveling Exhibition of 1925–26 as well. Luce lived in Minneapolis in 1925; the following year she married conservator and art historian Alan Burroughs of the Fogg Art Museum and moved to Cambridge, Massachusetts. In 1929 they moved to the suburb of Belmont, and in 1942 they purchased the house Threeways in Little Compton, Rhode Island, where both she and her husband died. In 1966 twenty of her paintings were exhibited in a one-woman show celebrating the 50th anniversary of the graduation of Wheaton's class of 1916.

Luce was described by critic Henry McBride as "the American Breughel", and her early style is reminiscent of that of Charles Burchfield; later paintings take a Precisionist approach. The Whitney Museum of American Art owns examples of her work, as does the Metropolitan Museum of Art, which reproduced Winter in the Suburbs as a Christmas card. Her painting Pennsylvania Coal Country of 1927, owned by the Carnegie Museum of Art, was included in the inaugural exhibition of the National Museum of Women in the Arts, American Women Artists 1830–1930, in 1987.

Luce's papers are held by Syracuse University. An oral history interview, recorded in 1981, is currently held by the Archives of American Art.
