= Howland Cobblestone Store =

Historic commercial building in New York, United States

- U.S. National Register of Historic Places
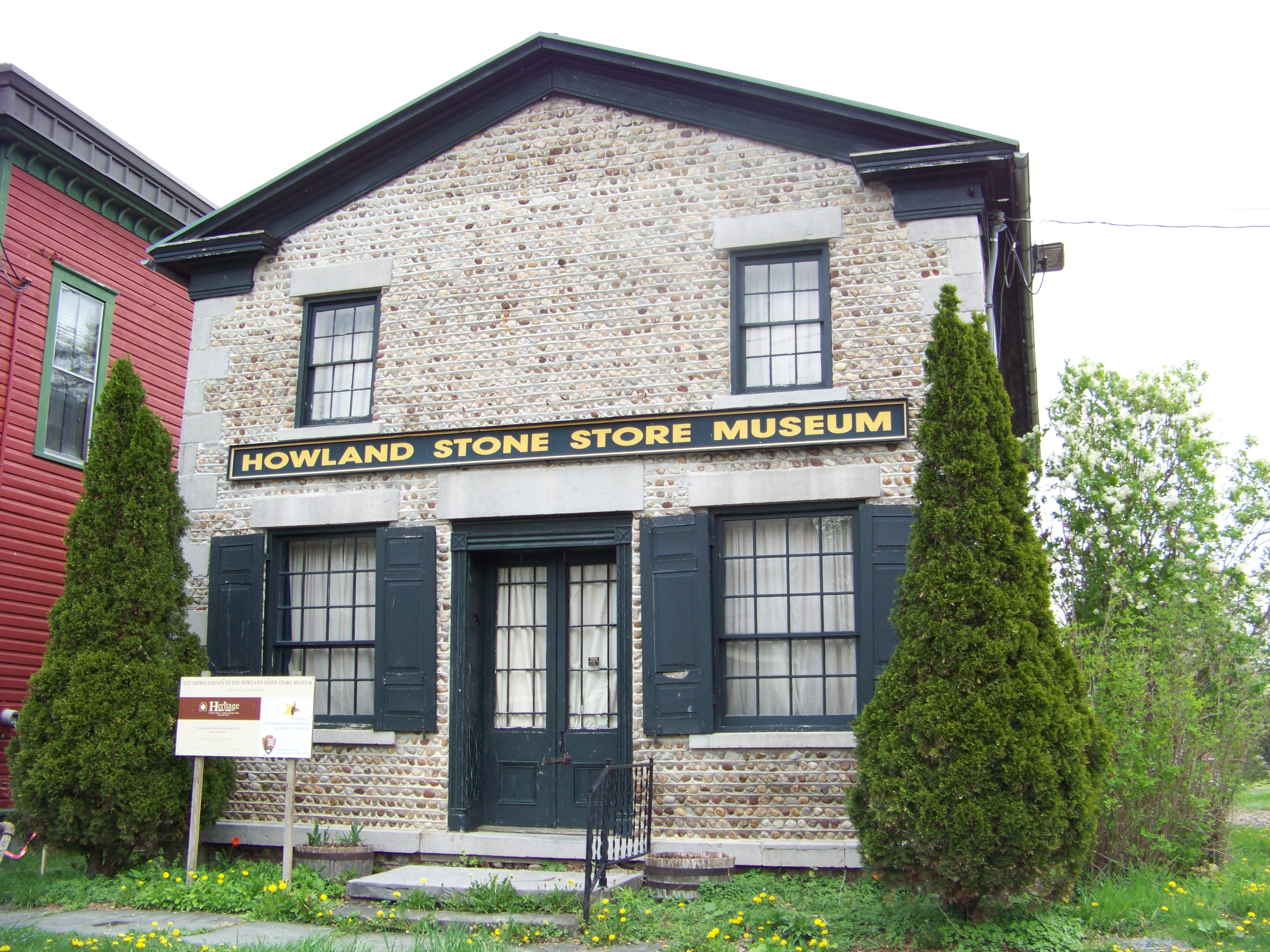

- Location within New York Location within the United States
- Location: 2956 State Route 34B, Sherwood, New York
- Coordinates: 42°45′40″N 76°37′17″W
- Built: 1837
- Architectural style: Federal
- MPS: Cobblestone Architecture of New York State MPS
- NRHP reference No.: 94000171
- Added to NRHP: March 17, 1994

The Howland Cobblestone Store, also known as the Howland Stone Store Museum, is an early 19th-century store significant for its unusual cobblestone architecture. It was added to the National Register of Historic Places in 1994. At the time of its nomination, the owners were in the process of restoring its original appearance by removing the stucco that had covered the cobblestones since the 1850s. That process has since been completed.

The store was originally owned by Slocum Howland, a Quaker, abolitionist, prohibitionist and suffragist. Among the items sold in his store was the cast iron plow, invented locally by his brother-in-law Jethro Wood.

Cobblestone architecture was highly developed in New York State. A survey identified 660 cobblestone structures in 21 New York counties. There may be approximately 300 elsewhere in the United States, concentrated in Vermont, Ohio, Michigan, and Illinois, all areas of similar Northern Tier culture. Many people from Vermont and New York moved west into the upper Midwest states.

== See also ==
- Jethro Wood House
