= Ledyard, New York =

- Town
- Location within Cayuga County and the state of New York

- Location within New York Location within the United States
- Coordinates: 42°45′22″N 76°40′7″W
- Country: United States
- State: New York
- County: Cayuga

Government
  - Type: Town Council
  - Town Supervisor: Mark B. Jordan (R)
  - Town Council: Members' List: • James C. Frisch (R); • John P. Binns (R); • Paul G. Hilliard (R); • William E. Heary (R)

Area
  - Total: 48.58 sq mi (125.82 km^{2})
  - Land: 36.11 sq mi (93.53 km^{2})
  - Water: 12.47 sq mi (32.29 km^{2})
- Elevation: 720 ft (220 m)

Population (2020)
  - Total: 1,654 ▼
  - Estimate (2021): 1,646
  - Density: 51.6/sq mi (19.94/km^{2})
- Time zone: UTC-5 (Eastern (EST))
  - Summer (DST): UTC-4 (EDT)
- ZIP Codes: 13026 (Aurora); 13081 (King Ferry); 13160 (Union Springs)
- Area code: 315
- FIPS code: 36-011-41740
- GNIS feature ID: 0979136
- Website: www.townofledyard.com

Ledyard is a town in Cayuga County, New York, United States. The population was 1,654 at the 2020 census. The town was named in honor of Revolutionary War General Benjamin Ledyard, an early settler of the town. Ledyard is on the western edge of the county and is southwest of Auburn. Ledyard’s principal population center is the Village of Aurora.

Wells College was founded as a college for women in 1868 in the Village of Aurora. It announced its permanent closure in 2024.

== History ==
The south part of Ledyard was in the New York Military Tract, and the northern part was originally a reservation designated for the Cayuga tribe. The first settlers arrived around 1789. It was then part of the town of Scipio, one of the original towns of the Military Tract. The town of Ledyard was established in 1823 as part of a division of towns from the original town of Scipio.

The North Street Friends Meetinghouse was listed on the National Register of Historic Places in 2005.

== Notable person ==
Henry Wells, founder of Wells Fargo and American Express, was from Aurora.

== Geography ==
According to the United States Census Bureau, the town has a total area of 48.5 square miles (125.6 km^{2}), of which 36.1 square miles (93.5 km^{2}) is land and 12.5 square miles (32.3 km^{2}), or 25.67%, is water.

The town is on the eastern shore of Cayuga Lake, in the Finger Lakes region.

The western town line is the border of Seneca County.

New York State Route 34B and New York State Route 90 are north-south highways in Ledyard.

== Demographics ==
Historical population
Census	Pop.	Note	%±
1830	2,427		—
1840	2,143		−11.7%
1850	2,043		−4.7%
1860	2,219		8.6%
1870	2,221		0.1%
1880	2,199		−1.0%
1890	2,185		−0.6%
1900	1,909		−12.6%
1910	1,719		−10.0%
1920	1,475		−14.2%
1930	1,236		−16.2%
1940	1,322		7.0%
1950	1,577		19.3%
1960	1,646		4.4%
1970	1,886		14.6%
1980	1,869		−0.9%
1990	1,737		−7.1%
2000	1,832		5.5%
2010	1,886		2.9%
2020	1,654		−12.3%
2021 (est.)	1,646		−0.5%
U.S. Decennial Census

As of the census of 2000, there were 1,832 people, 608 households, and 423 families residing in the town. The population density was 50.4 inhabitants per square mile (19.5/km^{2}). There were 886 housing units at an average density of 24.4 per square mile (9.4/km^{2}). The racial makeup of the town was 95.96% White, 0.71% African American, 0.38% Native American, 1.31% Asian, 0.55% from other races, and 1.09% from two or more races. Hispanic or Latino of any race were 1.15% of the population.

There were 608 households, out of which 30.8% had children under the age of 18 living with them, 59.0% were married couples living together, 8.1% had a female householder with no husband present, and 30.4% were non-families. 24.2% of all households were made up of individuals, and 10.5% had someone living alone who was 65 years of age or older. The average household size was 2.52 and the average family size was 3.03.

In the town, the population was spread out, with 20.4% under the age of 18, 21.3% from 18 to 24, 22.2% from 25 to 44, 23.0% from 45 to 64, and 13.0% who were 65 years of age or older. The median age was 35 years. For every 100 females, there were 71.4 males. For every 100 females age 18 and over, there were 65.2 males.

The median income for a household in the town was $42,857, and the median income for a family was $51,842. Males had a median income of $31,719 versus $24,750 for females. The per capita income for the town was $18,231. About 1.9% of families and 3.4% of the population were below the poverty line, including 1.6% of those under age 18 and 2.4% of those age 65 or over.

== Communities and locations in Ledyard ==
- Aurora – The village of Aurora is on NY-90 and the shore of Cayuga Lake.
- Barbers Corners – A location in the northeast of Ledyard.
- Black Rock – A hamlet west of Ledyard.
- Chapel Corners – A location southeast of Aurora.
- Cooneys Corners – A location in the northern part of Ledyard.
- Ellis Point – A projection into Cayuga Lake by Levanna.
- Ledyard – The hamlet of Ledyard is on the town line in the southwest of the town on NY-34B.
- Levanna – A hamlet on NY-90 by the shore of Cayuga Lake, north of Aurora.
- Long Point State Park is south of Aurora village.
- Prospect Corners – A location southeast of Aurora.
- Stony Point – A projection into Cayuga Lake north of the state park.
- Turney Corners – A location southeast of Aurora.
- Willets – A hamlet on the shore of Cayuga Lake, south of the state park.

== Education ==
Most of Ledyard is in the Southern Cayuga Central School District while a piece is in the Union Springs Central School District.

Wells College was in the town.
