= Amy Otis =

American painter (1863–1950)

Mary Amy Otis (1863–1950) was an American miniaturist.

Otis was a native of Sherwood, New York, and was born to a family of Quakers. Her parents had migrated to the area at different times from Massachusetts, and had seven other children, six surviving; among them was Susan, who later became a noted physician in Cayuga County. Her grandfather was Job Otis, who with his wife Deborah was a leader of the Otisites, and whose house may still be seen today in Sherwood. Amy studied at Cornell University and the Philadelphia School of Design for Women, and was a graduate of the Pennsylvania Academy of the Fine Arts. She also studied at the Académie Colarossi in Paris. For some years she was active as a portraitist in Philadelphia, where she also taught art at Miss Capen's School for Girls from 1911 to 1914. In that year she began work a professor at Wheaton College in Massachusetts, ultimately becoming the head of the art department. Otis retired from Wheaton in 1932. She designed the seal for the school's Alumnae Association while she was there. After leaving Wheaton she taught for a time at Wells College, where she was at one point acting head of the Department of Art.

During her career Otis exhibited work throughout the United States. She was a member of the Philadelphia Water Color Club, the Pennsylvania Society of Miniature Painters, and The Plastic Club, and was a sister of Kappa Kappa Gamma. Among her pupils at Wheaton was the future Precisionist Molly Luce.

Otis was the aunt of painter Elizabeth Otis Dunn and illustrator Samuel Davis Otis, and was a descendant of Mayflower passenger John Howland; numerous other ancestors were prominent in the history of Scituate, Massachusetts. A lecture series at Wheaton was established in her honor by the Class of 1931 after her death. A miniature watercolor-on-ivory portrait of Dorothy Gifford, titled A College Girl, is currently owned by the Philadelphia Museum of Art.
