= Slocum and Hannah Howland House =

Historic house in New York, United States

- U.S. National Register of Historic Places
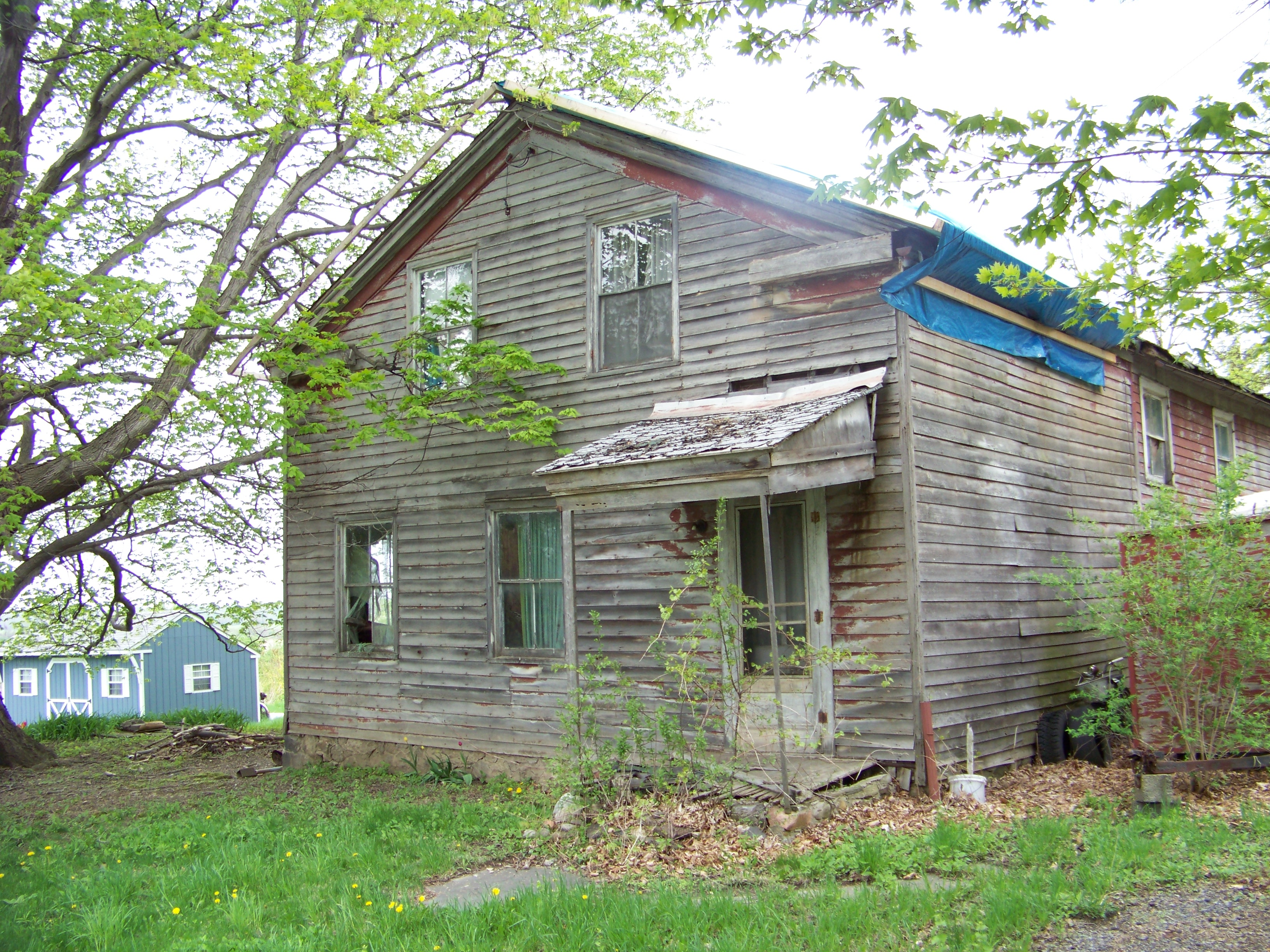

- Location within New York Location within the United States
- Location: 1781 Sherwood Rd., Sherwood, New York
- Coordinates: 42°45′47″N 76°37′21″W
- Built: 1830
- MPS: Freedom Trail, Abolitionism, and African American Life in Central New York MPS
- NRHP reference No.: 06000263
- Added to NRHP: April 12, 2006

The Slocum and Hannah Howland House is located at 1781 Sherwood Road in the hamlet of Sherwood in Cayuga County, New York. It was one of the most active Underground Railroad stations in New York.

== History ==
Slocum Howland (1791–1881) was a Quaker, a notable abolitionist, a businessman, and owner of the Howland Cobblestone Store, also in Sherwood, New York. Slocum was married to Hannah Tallcott (1796–1867) and had three children together: William Howland, a member of the 106th New York State Legislature; Emily Howland, a suffragette known for her work as a philanthropist and educator; and Benjamin.

As a station on the underground railroad, Howland helped at least four African American families settle in the area and help many more escape to Canada. He worked closely with William Lloyd Garrison and the American Anti-Slavery Society and established schools for African Americans.

The house was added to the National Register of Historic Places in 2006. In 2016, the home collapsed due to neglect.

== See also ==
- National Register of Historic Places listings in Cayuga County, New York
