= Semi-Pro =

2008 American sports comedy film

- Theatrical release poster
- Directed by: Kent Alterman
- Written by: Scot Armstrong
- Produced by: Jimmy Miller
- Starring: Will Ferrell; Woody Harrelson; André Benjamin; Maura Tierney; Will Arnett; David Koechner
- Cinematography: Shane Hurlbut
- Edited by: Debra Neil-Fisher; Peter Teschner
- Music by: Theodore Shapiro
- Production companies: Mosaic Media Group; The Donners' Company
- Distributed by: New Line Cinema
- Release dates: February 19, 2008 (Westwood premiere); February 29, 2008 (United States)
- Running time: 92 minutes
- Country: United States
- Language: English
- Budget: $55 million
- Box office: $43.9 million

Semi-Pro is a 2008 American sports comedy film. The film was directed by Kent Alterman in his directorial debut, written by Scot Armstrong, and produced by Jimmy Miller. It stars Will Ferrell, Woody Harrelson, André 3000 (credited as André Benjamin), and Maura Tierney, set during the final season of the American Basketball Association and telling the story of a fictional ABA team desperate to survive the league's merger with the NBA. The film was shot in Los Angeles near Dodger Stadium (in the gym of the Los Angeles City Fire Department Training Center), in Detroit, and in Flint, Michigan. Released in theaters on February 29, 2008, and released on DVD and Blu-ray Disc on June 3, 2008, it was the last film from New Line Cinema before they were absorbed by Warner Bros. Pictures. The film received generally negative reviews, with critics criticizing the script, though Ferrell's performance received praise.

== Plot ==
In 1976, Jackie Moon is a singer who used the profits from his one-hit wonder, "Love Me Sexy", to buy a basketball team in the American Basketball Association (ABA), the Flint Tropics, becoming the owner, head coach, starting power forward, and pre-game announcer. At a team owner's meeting, Alan Ault, the ABA Commissioner, announces a plan to merge the league with the National Basketball Association (NBA), but only four teams will move to the more established league while the rest of the teams would dissolve. The Tropics, the worst team in the league, are in danger of dissolving. Jackie, thinking fast, argues that the teams with the four best records should be merged. Some of the owners agree and vote in favor of Moon's recommendation.

Jackie trades the team's washing machine to the Kentucky Colonels for Ed Monix, a backup point guard who won an NBA Championship with the Boston Celtics, but was mostly benched during the playoffs. Meanwhile, Jackie owes Dukes, an unemployed hippie $10,000 after Dukes scored a shot from the halfway line, and the large check Jackie provided was fake. The Commissioner reveals that in addition to finishing in the top four, the Tropics will also need at least 2,000 fans at every remaining home game. Jackie begins to stage extremely desperate halftime show stunts in order to boost attendance, including wrestling a live bear and free corn dogs for the audience should the Tropics score over 125 points. Monix becomes fed up with Moon's antics which has caused them to lose a series of games and when Clarence calls Monix out as someone who was benched during the playoffs, Monix throws his championship ring at Clarence, saying he will never play in the NBA. After a brush with the law and reconnecting with his ex-girlfriend, Lynn, Clarence urges Monix to coach the Tropics. Monix agrees to the position much to Moon's dismay. Monix trains the team rigorously with a play he calls the "Puke", as the players are to run it until they literally throw up. When Moon reveals that he had never puked, even as a baby, Monix strikes him in the jejunum, causing Moon to puke.

From Monix's training as well as the increased intensity of Clarence, the Tropics go on a winning run, moving from last to fifth. Jackie gets a visit from Ault, who revealed that regardless of their score of victories and rise in the ranks, the NBA does not think that Flint has a large enough media market and will not allow the Tropics into the league even if they beat the first place San Antonio Spurs in the last game of the season. After breaking the news to his team, Jackie admits that he stole "Love Me Sexy" from a napkin his mother wrote on three weeks before she died. Realizing that all his assets are basically stolen, Jackie trades Withers to the Spurs so that he can realize his dream of playing in the NBA. Monix reassembles and inspires the team to leave everything on the court, while they may not be able to continue the franchise after this season, they have come very far and still have a lot to prove.

Going into the Spurs game, which Jackie declares the "MegaBowl", the Tropics are in fifth place and with a win they would make it into fourth, even though they will not be allowed into the NBA. The Tropics fall behind quickly, and Jackie is knocked unconscious when fouled hard at the end of the first half. Withers decides he has seen enough and rejoins the Tropics in their locker room, destroying his chance at the NBA with the Spurs. An unconscious Jackie imagines that he is in Heaven with his mother. He apologizes for stealing her song and she gives him a weapon in order to win.

Starting the second half, the Tropics reveal their new weapon: the alley-oop. With the return of Withers, the alley-oop is very effective, but the referee initially calls the play a foul. After some persuasion by Jackie and Monix, the referee is convinced that it is a legitimate play and the score should count. With seconds left, they are only behind by two points, 117–115, when the Spurs execute a defense against the Alley-Oop. Monix calls a time-out and tells them to run the "Puke", executing multiple razzle-dazzle passes ending with the ball in Jackie's hands under the net, but he gets fouled hard again with two seconds left, giving him two free throws. Shooting granny style, Jackie sinks the first basket. The second bounces off the rim but Monix tips in the rebound right at the buzzer for two points to win, sparking a wild celebration in the arena and the streets of Flint.

The Spurs' coach offers Withers his position back, giving him another shot at the NBA. Ault offers Jackie a position on the staff of the NBA as a marketing director due to his success with the Tropics, but is interrupted when Ault is mauled by a bear. At the end of the film, Dukes received a portion of the money Jackie owed him with a promise to get the rest once the buyout was completed.

== Cast ==
- Will Ferrell as Jackie Moon – The owner/player/coach of the failing Flint Tropics, famous for the aging disco hit "Love Me Sexy".
- Woody Harrelson as Ed Monix – The aging point guard, and former NBA Champion, although he was benched for most of the playoff games for the Boston Celtics.
- André Benjamin as Clarence Withers aka Sugar Dunkerton/Downtown Funkystuff Malone/Coffee Black – He dreams to play in the NBA, although all he ever does is gossip about going.
- Maura Tierney as Lynn – Ed Monix's ex-girlfriend.
- Andy Daly as Dick Pepperfield – Play-By-Play Announcer for the Tropics.
- Will Arnett as Lou Redwood – Color Commentator for the Tropics and former player. While calling the game, he smokes cigarettes and drinks Scotch.
- Andy Richter as Bobby Dee – General Manager for the Tropics.
- David Koechner as Alan Ault – the ABA Commissioner who holds Jackie in low-esteem.
- Rob Corddry as Kyle – Lynn's boyfriend who is a die-hard fan of Monix.
- Matt Walsh as Father Pat the Ref – Although a priest, he is the referee for almost all ABA games, not just the Tropics home contests.
- Jackie Earle Haley as Dukes – An unemployed hippie and number-one fan who makes a full-court shot to win $10,000 the Tropics don't have.
- DeRay Davis as Bee Bee Ellis – Guard/Forward and also the sixth man for the Tropics.
- Josh Braaten as Twiggy Munson – Small Forward for the Tropics.
- Jay Phillips as Scootsie Doubleday – Point Guard for the Tropics.
- Peter Cornell as Vakidis – Soviet/Lithuanian center for the Tropics. He does not understand English.

=== Cameos ===
- Patti LaBelle as Mrs. Moon – Jackie's late mother who appeared in Jackie's dream to invent the alley-oop.
- Tim Meadows as Cornelius Banks – A friend of Jackie's who thinks he plays for the Tropics.
- Jason Sudeikis as Nacho Fan – One of the few Tropics' season ticket holders.
- Pat Kilbane as Petrelli – Monix's rival in the ABA drafted to the Spurs and a dirty player.
- Kristen Wiig as Bear Handler
- Ellia English as Ms. Quincy – Clarence's mother, who proudly attends every Tropic game to support her son as well as the team.
- Ed Helms as Turtleneck – a reporter that Jackie calls on by his clothing
- Brian Huskey as White Pants – a reporter that Jackie calls on by his clothing
- Lo Mutac (Note: Credited as Charlyne Yi) as Wheelchair Jody
- Paul Rust as Wheelchair Boy
- Steve Bannos as Cop at Jail

In addition, former American Basketball Association players, Artis Gilmore and George Gervin, appear in uncredited roles as customers in a restaurant, while the already extensive list of Saturday Night Live cast members includes Jerry Minor, in the uncredited role of DJ at the nightclub.

=== Dewie the Bear ===
The bear featured in Semi-Pro was a 5-year-old, 7 1/2-foot-tall (2.3 m), 700-pound (320 kg) male grizzly bear named Rocky, who appeared in a scene where Will Ferrell's character wrestles the animal to promote his basketball team. Stuntman and trainer Randy Miller doubled for Ferrell during the wrestling match with the bear. On April 22, 2008, seven weeks after Semi-Pro entered wide release, Rocky was filming another wrestling video with 39-year-old Stephan Miller (Randy Miller's cousin and a fellow animal trainer). The bear responded aggressively, and fatally bit Stephan Miller on the neck. The bear was not euthanized as an investigation ruled Miller's death was accidental, but Rocky's contact with humans was restricted.

== Marketing ==
- A number shown in the teaser trailer, 1-800-TROPICS, when called, played a recorded message of Jackie Moon talking about season ticket packages for the 1976 season.
- Several ads for Anheuser-Busch were filmed featuring Will Ferrell in character as Jackie Moon that were aired during Super Bowl XLII. Some of the ads touted humorous promotional items with offers expiring in November 1977.
- A music video was released with Jackie Moon singing his 'hit' "Love Me Sexy".
- Ferrell appeared in character as Jackie Moon in TV spots for Old Spice deodorant.
- A prescreening at the Alamo Drafthouse in Austin, Texas two weeks prior to the box office debut featured an appearance by Will Ferrell and director Kent Alterman. In order to obtain entrance to the theater, all viewers had to wear a basketball uniform similar to the one worn by Ferrell in the film.
- An official Jackie Moon Semi-Pro costume was released in summer 2008 for Halloween.
- A Sports Illustrated swimsuit issue spread featured Ferrell with Heidi Klum.

== Reception ==
=== Critical reception ===
Semi-Pro received generally negative reviews from critics. The review aggregator Rotten Tomatoes gives the film an approval score of 23% based on 160 reviews, with an average rating of 4.5/10. The site's critical consensus reads, "Semi-Pro is an intermittently funny, half-hearted attempt at sports satire, and one of Will Ferrell's weaker cinematic efforts." Metacritic reported that the film had an average score of 47 out of 100, based on 29 reviews. Audiences polled by CinemaScore gave the film an average grade of "B−" on an A+ to F scale.

Matt Zoller Seitz of New York Times said, "Semi-Pro finds the sweet spot between sports melodrama and parody, and hammers it for 90 diverting minutes." Peter Travers writing for Rolling Stone stated, "when the script, by Scott Armstrong, shoots air balls, Ferrell is a slam-dunk." Claudia Puig of USA Today said, "Although not exactly a slam dunk, Semi-Pro is definitely more than semi-funny." In his review for The Village Voice, Robert Wilonsky gave the film 2 stars of a possible 4 and wrote that director Kent Alterman, "valiantly tries to tweak the formula by adding a dash more sincerity and humanity to the froth but doesn't get too adventurous. But in the end, it's comedy comfort food, something powdered poured from a box."

=== Box office performance ===
In its opening weekend, the film grossed $15 million in 3,121 theaters in the United States and Canada, holding the number one position at the box office. Alicia Chang of the Associated Press described the opening as "lackluster" compared to Ferrell's previous sports spoofs Talladega Nights, which opened with $47 million, and Blades of Glory, which opened with $33 million. The basketball film went on to gross $33,479,698 domestically and $10,405,206 internationally, for a total of $43,884,904 worldwide.

=== Awards ===
2008 ESPY Awards

1. Best Sports Movie ESPY Award

2008 Teen Choice Awards

1. Teen Choice Award for Choice Movie - Comedy (Nominated)

== Home media ==
Semi-Pro was released on DVD and Blu-ray on June 3, 2008, by New Line Home Entertainment. There is a theatrical R-Rated version DVD and a 2-Disc "Let's Get Sweaty" Unrated Edition DVD and Blu-ray disc. The film's special features include unrated deleted scenes and more.

== Soundtrack ==
Semi-Pro (Original Motion Picture Soundtrack)

Soundtrack album by various artists
- Released: February 26, 2008
- Genre: Funk
- Label: New Line Records

The soundtrack for the film was released on February 26, 2008, and featured songs by LaBelle, WAR, Curtis Mayfield, Will Ferrell, among others. "Love Me Sexy" is sung by the fictional Jackie Moon (played by Will Ferrell).

1. "Love Me Sexy" – Will Ferrell
2. "Get Da Funk Out Ma' Face" – Brothers Johnson
3. "Lady Marmalade" – LaBelle
4. "The World Is a Ghetto" – WAR
5. "Tell Me Something Good" – Ronnie Laws
6. "Mr. Big Stuff" – Jean Knight
7. "Give Me Just a Little More Time" – Chairmen of the Board
8. "Why Can't We Be Friends" – WAR
9. "Walking in Rhythm" – The Blackbyrds
10. "Dance to the Music" – Sly & The Family Stone
11. "Love Rollercoaster" – Ohio Players
12. "Que Sera, Sera (Whatever Will Be, Will Be)" – Sly & The Family Stone
13. "Move On Up" – Curtis Mayfield
14. "Shining Star" – Elijah Kelley

== See also ==
- List of basketball films
- The Fish That Saved Pittsburgh
- Slap Shot
