= Stephan Miller =

American animal trainer (1968–2008)

- Born: Stephan K. Miller; May 6, 1968
- Died: April 22, 2008 (aged 39)
- Occupation: Animal trainer

Stephan K. Miller (May 6, 1968 – April 22, 2008) was an American animal trainer, wrangler, and stunt double who was killed by a bear while making a promotional video.

Miller had worked as a trainer at Predators in Action, an animal training facility operated by his paternal cousin, Randy Miller, who trains wild and exotic animals for film and television appearances. At the time of his death, Miller was not working as a trainer, but was attempting to perform a bear wrestling stunt supervised by Randy Miller.

== Animal training career ==
Miller was an experienced animal trainer who had worked for Predators in Action for several years before leaving to pursue other business ventures. Although he was not the trainer for the bear that killed him, he was experienced with bears, having helped Randy Miller raise and train a previous bear named Dakota. Films in which animals trained by the facility appeared (including after Miller's departure) include The Island of Dr. Moreau, Gladiator, The Postman, The Last Samurai, and Semi-Pro. Predators in Action animals have also appeared on Discovery Channel and National Geographic Society programs in which they recreated famous animal attacks, including the mauling of Roy Horn by a white tiger.

== Other ventures ==
In addition to his work with animals, Miller was also a co-publisher for the first three print issues of Girls and Corpses magazine with publisher/editor-in-chief Robert Steven Rhine, as well as being actively involved in the launch of the ShareNow social networking website.

== Death ==
On April 22, 2008, while filming a promotional video at the Predators in Action facility, Miller was killed by a 5-year old grizzly bear named Rocky. Rocky was a bear actor who had been trained to wrestle humans. At that time, the bear was already in the public eye, appearing in movie theaters as "Dewey the Killer Bear" in the film Semi-Pro, which went into wide release just seven weeks earlier, in which he wrestled Will Ferrell's body double Randy Miller. Stephan Miller had asked to be filmed wrestling Rocky for an advertisement. Although Stephan Miller had not been involved in training Rocky, Randy Miller agreed to the request because Stephan Miller was an experienced trainer and had also recently been in a photoshoot with Rocky and gotten to know him slightly.

The plan was to first take some shots of Stephan Miller and Rocky casually standing next to each other and then later begin the staged wrestling match. However, during the initial shots, Rocky stood up in his trained wrestling posture and began the staged attack too early, catching Miller off guard without his arm raised in the proper defensive position. Randy Miller then hit Rocky with a cane, trying to make him let go of Stephan, an action that Randy later said might have unwittingly escalated the bear attack. The 7.5-foot (2.3 m)-tall, 700-pound (320 kg) bear bit Stephan Miller on the neck once, piercing his jugular vein and carotid artery. An autopsy revealed that he died within minutes of the attack.

Following Stephan Miller's death, the California Department of Fish and Game initiated a probe into the events of the attack with the intent to eventually decide whether Rocky would be euthanized. People for the Ethical Treatment of Animals (PETA) and other animal rights groups, who have long protested use of wild animals in films, called for Rocky to be spared and to be allowed to retire to a zoo or another similar facility.

It was later revealed on the National Geographic Channel program Grizzly Face to Face: Hollywood Bear Tragedy that the coroner's office and the California Department of Fish and Game ruled Miller's death accidental and did not order that the bear be euthanized. However, Rocky was required to live under restrictions and was no longer able to have contact with persons other than his trainers. He could no longer be exhibited or used for film or TV work. In Grizzly Face to Face, Randy Miller stated that he planned to continue working with Rocky and try to get the restrictions lifted because he believed that Stephan would have wanted that.

In 2012, the California Fish and Game Commission considered whether to lift the restrictions on Rocky's permit to allow him to again work in the state of California. According to Randy Miller and Rocky's legal team, new safety protocols had been put in place; other animal trainers and experts had supplied testimony that Rocky was not dangerous; a petition drive had shown that many persons from around the world supported his return to work; and the U.S. Department of Agriculture had cleared him to work, with the only remaining restrictions being in California, the location of most available work for Rocky. Following a hearing on October 3, 2012, the Commission decided not to remove Rocky's permit restrictions. In 2022, Rocky was relocated to a large animal sanctuary in Alpine, California.

== See also ==
- Bear attack
- Bear danger
- Timothy Treadwell
