= Southern Cayuga Central School District =

School district in New York, United States

Location
- Aurora, New York United States

District information
- Motto: What You Do Matters
- Grades: K-12
- Superintendent: Patrick Jensen
- Schools: 2

Students and staff
- Athletic conference: Small North Division
- District mascot: Falcons
- Colors: Red and White

Other information
- Website: Southern Cayuga Central School District

Southern Cayuga Central School District is a school district which spans the southern portion of Cayuga County in New York, United States. The superintendent is Patrick Jensen. The district operates two schools: Southern Cayuga Junior and Senior High School and Emily Howland Elementary School.

== Administration ==
The district offices are located at 2384 State Route 34B.

=== Current administrators ===
- Patrick Jensen; Superintendent

=== Selected Former Superintendents ===
- David C. Smith
- Peter F. Cardamone–?-2005
- Thomas M. Turck–2005-2005
- Mary Kay Worth–2006-2012

== Southern Cayuga High School ==
Southern Cayuga High School

Information
- Principal: Luke A. Carnicelli
- Grades: 9-12
- Hours in school day: 6
- Website: Southern Cayuga High School

Southern Cayuga High School is located at 2384 Rt 34B, in Poplar Ridge and serves grades 9 through 12. The current principal is Luke Carnicelli.

=== History ===
==== Selected former principals ====
Previous assignment and reason for departure denoted in parentheses

- Mimi Trudeau ?-2002
- James De Rusha–2002-2003
- Dennis Farnsworth–2003-2005
- Karen Simon–2005-2006(Principal - Southern Cayuga Middle School, named Assistant Principal of North Street Elementary School)

== Southern Cayuga Middle School ==
Southern Cayuga Middle School

Information
- Type: Public, Coeducational
- Principal: Patricia Reilley
- Grades: 5-8
- Hours in school day: 6
- Website: Southern Cayuga Middle School

Southern Cayuga Middle School is located at 2384 Rt 34B in Poplar Ridge and serves grades 5 through 8. The current principal is Christopher Clapper.

== Emily Howland Elementary School ==
Emily Howland Elementary School

Information
- Type: Public, Coeducational
- Principal: Jean Amadeo
- Grades: K-4
- Hours in school day: 6
- Website: Emily Howland Elementary School

Emily Howland Elementary School is located at 2892 State Route 34B in Aurora and serves grades K through 4. The current principal is Mary Lou Cronin.
