= North Street Friends Meetinghouse =

Historic church in New York, United States

- U.S. National Register of Historic Places
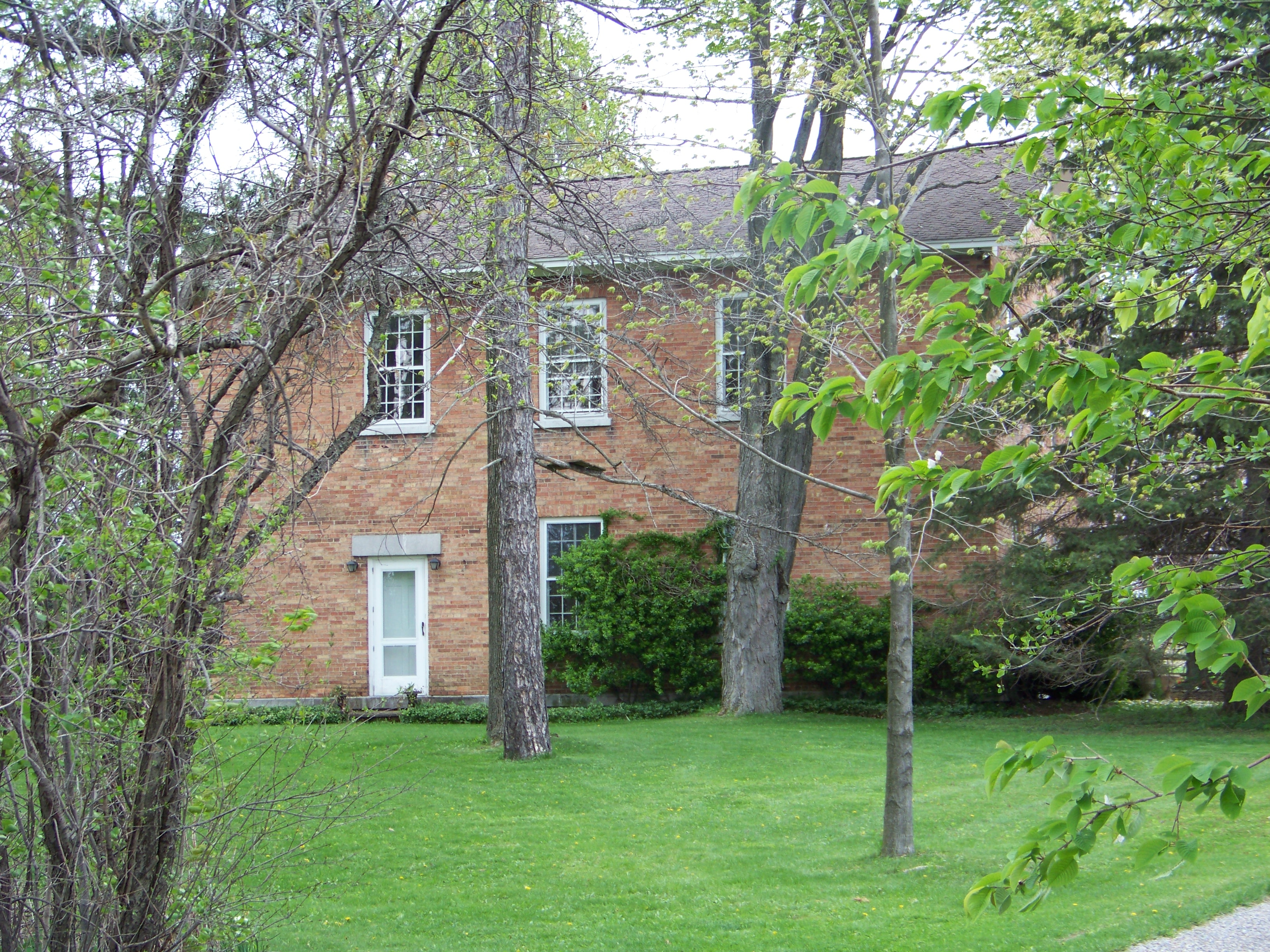

- Location within New York Location within the United States
- Location: Ledyard, New York
- Coordinates: 42°45′48″N 76°39′4″W
- Built: 1834
- Architectural style: Greek Revival
- MPS: Freedom Trail, Abolitionism, and African American Life in Central New York MPS
- NRHP reference No.: 05001386
- Added to NRHP: December 9, 2005

The North Street Friends Meetinghouse is a brick structure on Brick Church Road in the town of Ledyard, near Aurora (west bank of Cayuga Lake), Cayuga County, New York. It is significant for its associations with abolition, the Underground Railroad and the Women's Rights Movement in Central New York.

It was added to the National Register of Historic Places in 2005.
