= Scipio Center, New York =

- Hamlet
- Location within New York Location within the United States
- Coordinates: 42°47′01″N 76°33′33″W
- Country: United States
- State: New York
- County: Cayuga
- Elevation: 1,191 ft (363 m)
- Time zone: UTC-5 (Eastern (EST))
  - Summer (DST): UTC-4 (EDT)
- ZIP code: 13147
- Area codes: 315 & 680
- GNIS feature ID: 964654

Scipio Center is a hamlet in Cayuga County, New York, United States. The community is located along New York State Route 34, 10.3 miles (16.6 km) south of Auburn. Scipio Center has a post office with ZIP code 13147, which opened on February 20, 1934.
