= Sherwood, New York =

- Hamlet
- Location of Sherwood in New York
- Coordinates: 42°45′39″N 76°37′17″W
- Country: United States
- State: New York
- County: Cayuga
- Town: Scipio
- ZIP Code: 13026 (Aurora)

Sherwood is a hamlet in the town of Scipio, in Cayuga County, New York, United States.

It is the location of four properties or districts listed on the National Register of Historic Places:

- Augustus Howland House, 1395 Sherwood Rd., Sherwood
- Slocum and Hannah Howland House, 1781 Sherwood Rd., Sherwood
- Job and Deborah Otis House, 1882-1886 Sherwood Rd., Sherwood
- Sherwood Equal Rights Historic District, Sherwood Rd. & NY 34B, Sherwood

== Notable people ==
Painter Amy Otis was a native of Sherwood.

Quaker abolitionist Emily Howland was from Sherwood.
