= Kent Alterman =

American film director and producer

- Occupations: Director, producer
- Years active: 1996–present

Kent Alterman is an American television executive, film director and producer. He is known for his work at Comedy Central, where he served as president from 2016 to 2019, and for directing the 2008 sports comedy film Semi-Pro.

== Early life and career ==
Kent Alterman graduated from the University of Oregon in 1981 with a Bachelor of Fine Arts degree in photography and design.

Alterman began his television career at Comedy Central in the mid-1990s, serving as head of the network's New York development office and working on series such as Strangers with Candy, Upright Citizens Brigade and Viva Variety.

He later moved into feature film production at New Line Cinema, where he rose to executive vice president of production and was involved in films including Elf, Little Children and A History of Violence.

In 2010, Alterman returned to Comedy Central as head of original programming and production, overseeing development and day-to-day operations of the network's original series. Under his leadership in that role, Comedy Central more than doubled its slate of original series and launched shows such as Key & Peele, Inside Amy Schumer, Broad City and Drunk History.

He became president of Comedy Central in 2016 and continued to oversee the brand across platforms until departing the network in 2019.

== Recognition ==
In a 2014 profile on Comedy Central's programming strategy, Rolling Stone described Alterman as "the man who saved Comedy Central" in reference to his role in developing new shows following the departure of several of the network's flagship hosts. In 2016 he served as the commencement speaker at the University of Oregon, where he spoke about creative risk-taking and resiliency to the graduating class.

== Filmography ==
Year	Title	Credit
2003	Elf	Executive producer
2004	After the Sunset	Executive producer
2005	A History of Violence	Executive producer
2006	Little Children	Executive producer
2008	Semi-Pro	Director, executive producer
