= Poplar Ridge, New York =

Hamlet in New York, United States

Coordinates: 42°44′18″N 76°37′05″W

Poplar Ridge, New York is a hamlet in Cayuga County, New York, United States, in the town of Venice, New York. It holds the Jethro Wood House, a National Historic Landmark. The Vernon Center Green Historic District was listed on the National Register of Historic Places in 1985.
