= List of county routes in Cayuga County, New York =

County routes in Cayuga County, New York, are not signed in any form, serving as little more than references for inventory purposes. Route numbers below 114 generally increase progressively based on the alphabetical order of the towns where they are primarily located, beginning with Aurelius and ending with Victory (excluding Montezuma); however, several exceptions exist. Routes 114 through 116 are primarily in the town of Montezuma, while numbers above 121 do not follow any pattern.

== Routes 1–50 ==
Route	Length (mi)	Length (km)	From	Via	To	Notes
CR 1	5.40	8.69	CR 2A in Cayuga	Genesee Street	NY 326 / NY 931E in Aurelius	
CR 2A	1.26	2.03	Cayuga village line in Aurelius	Lake Road and Center and Willard streets	NY 90 in Cayuga	
CR 3A	1.85	2.98	US 20 / NY 5	Fosterville Road in Aurelius	CR 10C	
CR 3B	3.94	6.34	CR 10C in Aurelius	Fosterville Road	CR 142 in Montezuma	
CR 4A	1.76	2.83	CR 4B in Springport	Town Line and Aurelius–Springport roads	CR 168A / CR 168B in Aurelius	
CR 4B	2.70	4.35	NY 326	Cross Road in Springport	CR 4A	
CR 5B	3.77	6.07	CR 76A / CR 76B	Ridge Road in Fleming	NY 326	
CR 6A	1.80	2.90	CR 6B at Fleming town line	Bluefield Road in Aurelius	NY 326	
CR 6B	3.25	5.23	NY 34B	Bluefield Road in Fleming	CR 6A at Aurelius town line	
CR 6C	1.26	2.03	CR 6A	Experimental Road in Aurelius	NY 326	
CR 7A	2.73	4.39	Auburn city line	Canoga Road in Aurelius	CR 7B at Throop town line	
CR 7B	0.97	1.56	CR 7A at Aurelius town line	Canoga Road in Throop	CR 10B	
CR 8A	1.81	2.91	CR 1	Cayuga Turnpike in Aurelius	US 20 / NY 5	
CR 9	1.10	1.77	US 20 / NY 5 / NY 931E	Half Acre Road in Aurelius	CR 7A	
CR 10A	2.75	4.43	CR 10B at Throop town line	Turnpike Road in Sennett	NY 5 / CR 87B	
CR 10B	5.04	8.11	CR 10C at Aurelius town line	Turnpike Road in Throop	CR 10A at Sennett town line	
CR 10C	2.71	4.36	US 20 / NY 5	Turnpike Road in Aurelius	CR 10B at Throop town line	
CR 12B	2.67	4.30	CR 12C at Sennett town line in Brutus	Weedsport–Sennett Road and South Street	CR 31B in Weedsport	
CR 12C	1.61	2.59	NY 5	Weedsport–Sennett Road in Sennett	CR 12B at Brutus town line	
CR 13B	2.96	4.76	CR 13C at Mentz town line in Brutus	Oakland Road and Oakland Street	West Brutus Street in Weedsport	
CR 13C	2.22	3.57	CR 56	Oakland Road in Mentz	CR 13B in Brutus	
CR 14	3.32	5.34	CR 31B	Cottle and Bonta Bridge roads in Brutus	CR 18B at Cato town line	
CR 15A	1.90	3.06	CR 15B at Sennett town line	Jericho Road in Brutus	CR 31B	
CR 15B	0.61	0.98	NY 5	Jericho Road in Sennett	CR 15A at Brutus town line	
CR 16	5.28	8.50	Onondaga County line in Cato (becomes CR 61)	Jordan Road	NY 370 in Meridian	
CR 17A	1.08	1.74	CR 17B at Conquest town line	Slayton Road in Cato	NY 370	
CR 17B	4.02	6.47	NY 38 / CR 22	Slayton Road in Conquest	CR 17A at Cato town line	
CR 18B	6.36	10.24	CR 14 at Brutus town line in Cato	Bonta Bridge Road	NY 370 in Meridian	
CR 19A	2.10	3.38	CR 19B at Conquest town line	Emerson Road in Cato	NY 34	
CR 19B	4.01	6.45	CR 19C at Mentz town line	O'Neil and Emerson roads in Conquest	CR 19A at Cato town line	
CR 19C	1.29	2.08	CR 56	O Neil Road in Mentz	CR 19B at Conquest town line	Discontinuous at Seneca River
CR 20B	5.39	8.67	NY 34 in Cato	Shortcut Road	NY 370 in Meridian	
CR 21	2.95	4.75	CR 4A	Benham and Blanchard roads in Aurelius	US 20 / NY 5 / CR 142A	
CR 22	1.47	2.37	CR 23	Fuller Road in Conquest	NY 38 / CR 17B	
CR 23	4.38	7.05	Wayne County line (becomes CR 275)	Spring Lake Road in Conquest	NY 38	
CR 23A	0.37	0.60	Wayne County line	Spring Lake Road in Conquest	CR 131	
CR 24A	2.89	4.65	CR 23	Duck Lake Road in Conquest	CR 24B at Victory town line	
CR 24B	3.51	5.65	CR 24A at Conquest town line	Duck Lake Road in Victory	CR 108	
CR 25	2.85	4.59	CR 150	Dunning Avenue in Fleming	Auburn city line	
CR 25A	0.37	0.60	NY 34	Willowbrook Road in Fleming	CR 25	
CR 26B	5.56	8.95	CR 42B in Genoa	Wyckoff Road	NY 38 in Fleming	
CR 26C	3.98	6.41	CR 26D at Fleming town line	Stewarts Corners Road in Venice	CR 43B	
CR 26D	1.06	1.71	NY 90 / CR 26E in Genoa	Stewarts Corners Road	CR 26C at Venice town line in Fleming	
CR 26E	1.71	2.75	NY 34	East Genoa Road in Genoa	NY 90 / CR 26D	
CR 27	1.50	2.41	NY 34	Sand Beach Road in Fleming	NY 38 / NY 437	
CR 28A	4.11	6.61	CR 151	Silver Street Road in Fleming	NY 34	
CR 31B	3.99	6.42	NY 31 in Weedsport	East Brutus Street and East Brutus Street Road	Onondaga County line in Brutus (becomes CR 99)	Formerly part of NY 31B
CR 32	4.20	6.76	CR 157	Atwater Road in Genoa	Tompkins County line (becomes CR 155)	
CR 34	7.40	11.91	Hill Road in Genoa	Indian Field Road	CR 43B in Venice	
CR 35A	4.52	7.27	CR 35B at Genoa town line	East Venice and McAllister roads in Venice	CR 43B	
CR 35B	1.12	1.80	NY 90	McAllister Road in Genoa	CR 35A at Venice town line	
CR 37A	2.37	3.81	CR 37C / CR 38	North Road in Ira	Oswego County line (becomes CR 21)	
CR 37B	3.43	5.52	NY 370	East and Bradt roads in Ira	CR 38	
CR 37C	0.31	0.50	End of county maintenance	Ferris Road in Ira	CR 37A / CR 38	
CR 38	4.71	7.58	NY 34 / CR 39A	Ira Hill and Lysander roads in Ira	Onondaga County line (becomes CR 34)	
CR 38B	5.73	9.22	NY 31 / NY 90	Loop Road in Montezuma	CR 116	Includes alternate route along Purser Road
CR 39A	2.22	3.57	NY 34 / CR 38	Ira Station Road in Ira	CR 39B at Victory town line	
CR 39B	3.07	4.94	CR 39A at Ira town line	Ira Station Road in Victory	CR 93	
CR 40	6.0	9.66	NY 34 / NY 370	Fox Hill Road	Oswego County line (became CR 56)	Former number; decommissioned in May 1970 for an extension of NY 34.
CR 41A	3.36	5.41	CR 41B at Cato town line	Southard Road in Ira	CR 38	
CR 41B	0.30	0.48	NY 370	Southard Road in Cato	CR 41A at Ira town line	
CR 42A	3.93	6.32	NY 90 in Aurora	Sherwood Road	CR 42B at Scipio town line in Ledyard	
CR 42B	6.18	9.95	CR 42A at Ledyard town line	Sherwood Road in Scipio	NY 38	
CR 43A	4.06	6.53	NY 90 in Aurora	Paines Creek and Poplar Ridge roads	CR 43B at Venice town line in Ledyard	
CR 43B	8.34	13.42	CR 43A at Ledyard town line	Poplar Ridge and Long Hill roads in Venice	CR 43C at Moravia town line	
CR 43C	2.87	4.62	CR 43B at Venice town line	Long Hill Road and Aurora Street in Moravia	NY 38	
CR 44A	4.47	7.19	NY 90	Levanna Road in Ledyard	CR 44B at Scipio town line	
CR 44B	3.66	5.89	CR 44A at Ledyard town line	Center Road in Scipio	NY 34 / CR 44C	
CR 44C	2.70	4.35	NY 34 / CR 44B	Center Road in Scipio	NY 38	
CR 45A	2.90	4.67	NY 90	Ledyard Road in Ledyard	NY 34B / CR 45B	
CR 45B	3.56	5.73	NY 34B / CR 45A	Ledyard Road in Venice	CR 34	
CR 46	4.27	6.87	NY 90 in Ledyard	Kings Corners Road	NY 34B in Scipio	
CR 48	1.43	2.30	Tompkins County line (becomes CR 154)	Creek Road in Locke	NY 90	
CR 50	1.64	2.64	Tompkins County line (becomes CR 101)	West Groton Road in Locke	CR 48	

== Routes 51–100 ==
Route	Length (mi)	Length (km)	From	Via	To	Notes
CR 51	2.51	4.04	Tompkins County line	Bird Cemetery Road in Locke	NY 90	
CR 54	3.28	5.28	NY 90	Tollgate Hill Road in Locke	CR 54A at Moravia town line	
CR 54A	0.48	0.77	CR 54 at Locke town line	Tollgate Hill Road in Moravia	NY 38	
CR 54B	1.81	2.91	NY 38	Harris Hill Road in Locke	CR 54	
CR 55	1.27	2.04	NY 38	Booth Road in Locke	CR 161	
CR 56	2.32	3.73	NY 31 / NY 38 in Port Byron	Main and North Main streets	NY 38 in Mentz	
CR 58A	2.26	3.64	CR 58B / CR 139A in Mentz	Maiden Lane and Maiden Lane Road	NY 38 in Port Byron	
CR 58B	1.94	3.12	CR 38B in Montezuma	Maiden Lane	CR 58A / CR 139A in Mentz	
CR 59	1.49	2.40	NY 38 in Port Byron	Pine Street and Nauvoo Road	CR 105 in Mentz	
CR 60	1.26	2.03	CR 60A (segment 1) / CR 144 (segment 2)	Halsey Road in Mentz	CR 60A (segment 2) at Port Byron village line	
CR 60A (1)	1.56	2.51	CR 60B	Henvy Road in Mentz	CR 60 / CR 60A (segment 1)	
CR 60A (2)	0.48	0.77	CR 60 at Port Byron village line	Halsey Road in Port Byron	NY 31 / NY 38	
CR 60B	1.24	2.00	CR 114B	Lasher Road in Throop	CR 60A	
CR 61A	5.35	8.61	NY 38 / NY 38A	North Main Street and Rockefeller Road in Moravia	CR 61B at Niles town line	
CR 61B	4.78	7.69	CR 61A at Moravia town line	Rockefeller Road in Niles	CR 61C at Owasco town line	
CR 61C	1.36	2.19	CR 61B at Niles town line	Rockefeller Road in Owasco	NY 38A	
CR 62A	2.12	3.41	CR 62B at Sempronius town line	Dresserville Road in Moravia	NY 38A	
CR 62B	3.58	5.76	CR 62C at Summerhill town line	Dresserville and Lake Como roads in Sempronius	CR 62A at Moravia town line	
CR 62C	4.62	7.44	NY 90	Lake Como Road in Summerhill	CR 62B at Sempronius town line	
CR 63A	1.75	2.82	NY 38A / CR 155	Sayles Corners Road in Moravia	CR 63B at Sempronius town line	
CR 63B	2.27	3.65	CR 63A at Sempronius town line	Sayles Corners Road in Sempronius	NY 41A	
CR 65A	4.87	7.84	CR 61A	Oak Hill Road in Moravia	CR 65B at Niles town line	
CR 65B	3.38	5.44	CR 65A at Moravia town line	Oak Hill and Arnold roads in Niles	CR 61B	
CR 66A	6.22	10.01	NY 38A / CR 71B	Globe, Salt, New Hope, and Glen Haven roads in Niles	CR 66B at Sempronius town line	
CR 66B	1.86	2.99	CR 66A at Niles town line	Glen Haven Road in Sempronius	Cortland County line (becomes CR 101)	
CR 67	3.06	4.92	CR 66A	Old Salt Road in Niles	NY 41A	
CR 68	1.89	3.04	CR 61B	Sam Adams Lane in Niles	CR 61B	
CR 69	6.55	10.54	CR 62B / CR 80 in Sempronius	Sand Hill, Hatheway, and White roads	CR 66A in Niles	
CR 69A	0.73	1.17	CR 69	Phillips Road in Sempronius	NY 41A	
CR 70	1.62	2.61	CR 61B	Duryea Road in Niles	CR 65B	
CR 71A	6.51	10.48	CR 71C in Owasco	Twelve Corners Road	NY 38A / CR 72 / CR 75 in Niles	
CR 71C	0.36	0.58	NY 38A / CR 66A	Wiggins Road in Owasco	CR 71A	
CR 72	4.92	7.92	NY 38A	Melrose Road in Owasco	CR 72B / CR 164	
CR 72A	0.21	0.34	NY 38A	Emma Street in Owasco	CR 72	
CR 72B	3.37	5.42	NY 38A / CR 71A / CR 75	North Road in Owasco	CR 72 / CR 164	
CR 73	1.25	2.01	NY 38A	Oakridge Road in Owasco	CR 72	
CR 74	2.45	3.94	NY 38A	Swartout Road in Owasco	CR 72B	
CR 75	0.43	0.69	CR 71A	Gahwiler and Scho roads in Owasco	NY 38A / CR 71A / CR 72B	
CR 76A	0.82	1.32	NY 34B	Ridge Road in Scipio	CR 5B / CR 76B	
CR 76B	3.54	5.70	NY 90 in Union Springs	Center Street and Number One Road	CR 5B / CR 76A in Fleming	
CR 77	1.73	2.78	CR 89	Truesdale Road in Springport	CR 76B	
CR 79	3.43	5.52	CR 44B	Black Street in Scipio	NY 34	
CR 80	0.92	1.48	CR 62B / CR 69	Crofoot Road in Sempronius	NY 41A	
CR 81A	2.95	4.75	CR 81B at Summerhill town line	Atwood Road in Sempronius	NY 41A	
CR 81C	3.45	5.55	CR 62C	Creech, Cutler School, and Atwood roads in Summerhill	CR 81A at Sempronius town line	
CR 83	4.17	6.71	Auburn city line	Franklin Street in Sennett	Onondaga County line (becomes CR 133)	
CR 84	2.08	3.35	CR 83 / CR 86	Chestnut Ridge Road in Sennett	NY 5	
CR 85	2.09	3.36	NY 34	County House Road in Sennett	NY 5	
CR 86	1.00	1.61	US 20	Pine Ridge Road in Sennett	CR 83 / CR 84	
CR 87A	1.25	2.01	CR 83	Cherry Street in Sennett	CR 87B	
CR 87B	4.18	6.73	CR 87A	Center Street and Parcell, Miller, Freeman, and Depot roads in Sennett	NY 5	
CR 88	1.70	2.74	CR 76B	Davis Road in Springport	NY 326 / CR 150A	
CR 89	4.00	6.44	NY 90 in Springport	Great Gully Road	NY 34B in Scipio	
CR 90	1.60	2.57	CR 5B in Fleming	Fitzpatrick and Lockwood roads	NY 326 in Springport	
CR 91	0.18	0.29	NY 90	Farleys Point Road in Springport	Dead end	
CR 93	5.24	8.43	NY 104	Ira Station North and Martville roads in Sterling	NY 3	
CR 94	1.67	2.69	CR 95 / CR 124 in Sterling	Fair Haven and Short Cut roads	NY 104A in Fair Haven	
CR 95	6.74	10.85	Wayne County line	Sterling Station Road in Sterling	NY 104A	
CR 96	3.19	5.13	NY 104A / CR 97	Irwin Road in Sterling	Oswego County line (becomes CR 20)	
CR 97	1.88	3.03	CR 98	McFarland, Gray, and Old State roads in Sterling	NY 104A / CR 96	
CR 98	3.31	5.33	NY 104A	Center and Farden roads in Sterling	CR 97	
CR 99	0.95	1.53	NY 38	Finches Corners Road in Sterling	CR 93	
CR 100	1.52	2.45	CR 102	Montgomery Road in Summerhill	CR 101	

== Routes 101 and up ==
Route	Length (mi)	Length (km)	From	Via	To	Notes
CR 101	1.26	2.03	Tompkins County line (becomes CR 103A)	Champlin Road in Summerhill	NY 90	
CR 102	1.19	1.92	Tompkins County line (becomes CR 102)	Salt Road in Summerhill	NY 90	
CR 103	0.50	0.80	CR 62C	Branch Road in Summerhill	NY 41A	
CR 104	1.97	3.17	Auburn city line	North Division Street Road in Throop	CR 10B	
CR 104	0.89	1.43	Wayne County line	Old State Road in Victory	NY 104	Former routing of NY 104
CR 105	5.03	8.10	NY 38 in Throop	Centerport Road	NY 31 in Mentz	
CR 108 (1)	1.90	3.06	NY 370	Victory Road in Victory	Wayne County line (becomes CR 267)	
CR 108 (2)	1.03	1.66	CR 108 (segment 1)	Kasson Way in Victory	Wayne County line (intersects CR 268)	
CR 112	6.81	10.96	NY 370	Pople Road in Victory	NY 38	
CR 114A	1.26	2.03	CR 3B	McDonald Road in Montezuma	CR 114B at Throop town line	
CR 114B	3.55	5.71	CR 114A at Montezuma town line	McDonald Road in Throop	CR 10b	
CR 115	1.87	3.01	CR 114A	Mentz Church Road in Montezuma	NY 31	
CR 116	2.22	3.57	NY 31	Denman Road in Montezuma	CR 58B	
CR 121	1.13	1.82	CR 98	Macniel and Sterling Valley roads in Sterling	NY 104A	
CR 122	2.37	3.81	NY 104A	Old State Road in Sterling	CR 98	
CR 123	0.12	0.19	Wayne County line	West Bay Road in Sterling	Fair Haven village line	
CR 124	2.62	4.22	CR 94 / CR 95	Shortcut Road in Sterling	NY 38	
CR 126	3.93	6.32	NY 38 in Victory	Coleman and Wright roads	CR 95 in Sterling	
CR 127 (1)	4.32	6.95	NY 370	Old State Road in Victory	NY 38	Former routing of NY 370; includes spur (Town Barn Road) at NY 38
CR 127 (2)	3.73	6.00	NY 370	Upton Road	CR 104	Former routing of NY 370; includes one-way connector at NY 370
CR 128	3.11	5.01	CR 38	White Cemetery Road in Ira	Oswego County line	
CR 129	1.96	3.15	NY 38 in Conquest	Townline Road	NY 370 in Victory	
CR 131	1.07	1.72	CR 23	Curran Road in Conquest	Wayne County line (becomes CR 262)	
CR 132	2.29	3.69	CR 19B	Spook Woods Road in Conquest	CR 17B	
CR 133A	1.55	2.49	CR 19B	Lemon School Road in Conquest	Cato town line	
CR 135	2.69	4.33	NY 34	Jorolemon Road in Cato	CR 16	
CR 136	0.37	0.60	CR 12C	Shepherd Road in Sennett	CR 136A at Brutus town line	
CR 136A	2.40	3.86	CR 136 at Sennett town line	Shepherd Road in Brutus	CR 31B	
CR 139	1.79	2.88	Erie Canal in Montezuma	Howland Island Road	NY 38 in Mentz	
CR 139A	1.20	1.93	CR 58A / CR 58B in Mentz	High Bridge Road	CR 139 in Mentz	
CR 140	1.38	2.22	NY 31	Trumble and Thompson roads in Mentz	CR 58A	Discontinuous at New York State Thruway
CR 141A	2.17	3.49	US 20 / NY 5	Laraway Road in Aurelius	CR 141B at Montezuma town line	
CR 141B	2.50	4.02	CR 141A at Aurelius town line	Laraway Road in Montezuma	NY 90	
CR 142	2.07	3.33	CR 3B	Carner and Fuller roads in Montezuma	NY 90	
CR 142A	2.19	3.52	US 20 / NY 5 / CR 21	Blanchard and Fuller roads in Aurelius	CR 142B at Montezuma town line	
CR 142B	1.06	1.71	CR 142A at Aurelius town line	Fuller Road in Montezuma	CR 142	
CR 143	2.70	4.35	CR 10B in Throop	Beach Road	CR 114A in Montezuma	
CR 144 (1)	1.65	2.66	CR 167	Beechtree Road in Aurelius	CR 144A at Mentz town line	
CR 144 (2)	0.83	1.34	CR 60 / CR 60A (segment 1)	Halsey and Hayden roads in Mentz	NY 38	
CR 144A	4.18	6.73	CR 144 (segment 1) at Aurelius town line	Beechtree Road, School Street, and Powers Road in Throop	CR 144 (segment 2)	
CR 145	1.20	1.93	NY 38	Sine Road in Throop	CR 105	
CR 146	2.36	3.80	CR 87B	Depot Road in Sennett	Onondaga County line (becomes CR 176)	
CR 147	1.64	2.64	CR 87B	Miller Road in Sennett	Onondaga County line	
CR 150	2.81	4.52	CR 5B	Skillet Road in Fleming	NY 34	
CR 150A	1.87	3.01	NY 326 / CR 88 in Springport	Powers Road	CR 5B in Fleming	
CR 151	2.36	3.80	NY 34	Fleming–Scipio Town Line Road in Fleming	CR 26B	
CR 152	2.73	4.39	CR 42A	Sands and Cooneys Corner roads in Ledyard	CR 46	
CR 154	3.91	6.29	CR 45A	Black Rock and Dog Corners roads in Ledyard	CR 42A	
CR 156	2.27	3.65	NY 38A / CR 156A	Martin Road in Owasco	CR 74	
CR 156A	0.93	1.50	CR 156B at Niles town line	Valentine Road in Owasco	NY 38A / CR 156	
CR 156B	2.20	3.54	CR 65B	Valentine Road in Niles	CR 156A at Owasco town line	
CR 157	3.07	4.94	Tompkins County line (becomes CR 185)	Lake Road in Genoa	NY 90	
CR 159	2.10	3.38	CR 26E	Goose Street in Genoa	NY 90	
CR 160	2.12	3.41	NY 90	Goodrich Hill Road in Locke	West Hill Road	
CR 161	1.84	2.96	Tompkins County line (becomes CR 171)	Chipmans Corners Road in Locke	NY 90	
CR 163	1.22	1.96	Tompkins County line (becomes CR 103B)	Hinman Road in Summerhill	NY 90	
CR 164	0.70	1.13	CR 72 / CR 72B	Baptist Corners Road in Owasco	Onondaga County line	
CR 165	3.20	5.15	CR 65B	Grange Hall Road in Niles	CR 71B	
CR 166	1.45	2.33	CR 81A	Scott Gulf Road in Sempronius	Cortland County line (becomes CR 100)	
CR 167	0.78	1.26	US 20 / NY 5	Clark Street Road in Aurelius	Auburn city line	
CR 168A	1.42	2.29	CR 4A / CR 168B	Oakwood Road in Aurelius	CR 1	Former routing of NY 326
CR 168B	0.82	1.32	NY 326	Oakwood Road in Springport	CR 4A / CR 168A	Former routing of NY 326

== See also ==
- County routes in New York
