= Venice, New York =

- Town
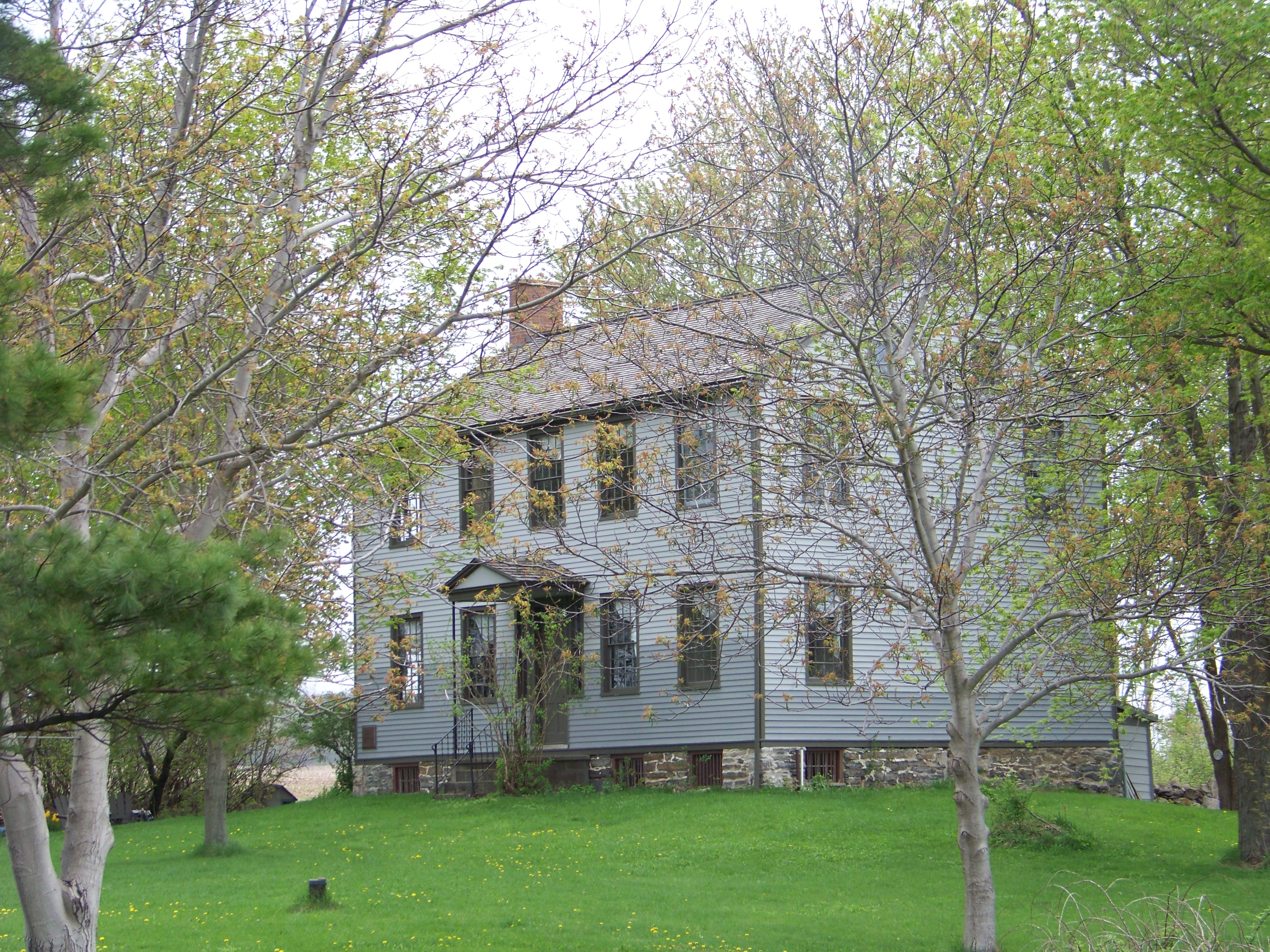
- The Jethro Wood House in Poplar Ridge

- Location within New York Location within the United States
- Coordinates: 42°43′16″N 76°31′55″W
- Country: United States
- State: New York
- County: Cayuga

Government
  - Type: Town Council
  - Town Supervisor: Stefan McGonagle (R)
  - Town Council: Members' List: • Edward Denton (R); • Terri Denman (R); • Cynthia Whitten (R); • Brian Sheils (R)

Area
  - Total: 41.29 sq mi (106.94 km^{2})
  - Land: 41.09 sq mi (106.42 km^{2})
  - Water: 0.20 sq mi (0.52 km^{2})
- Elevation: 965 ft (294 m)

Population (2010)
  - Total: 1,368
  - Estimate (2016): 1,351
  - Density: 33/sq mi (12.7/km^{2})
- Time zone: UTC-5 (Eastern (EST))
  - Summer (DST): UTC-4 (EDT)
- ZIP Codes: 13147 (Venice Center); 13026 (Aurora); 13071 (Genoa); 13081 (King Ferry); 13092 (Locke); 13118 (Moravia)
- Area code: 315
- FIPS code: 36-011-77024
- GNIS feature ID: 0979579
- Website: www.cayugacounty.us/venice

Venice is a town in Cayuga County, New York, United States. The population was 1,368 at the 2010 census. The town is in the southern part of Cayuga County and is south of Auburn.

== History ==
The town of Venice was formed from part of the town of Scipio in 1823.

== Geography ==
According to the United States Census Bureau, the town has a total area of 41.3 square miles (106.9 km^{2}), of which 41.1 square miles (106.4 km^{2}) is land and 0.19 square miles (0.5 km^{2}), or 0.48%, is water.

A small part of Owasco Lake borders the northeastern part of Venice.

New York State Route 34, New York State Route 34B, and New York State Route 38 are north–south highways in Venice.

== Demographics ==
Historical population
Census	Pop.	Note	%±
1830	2,445		—
1840	2,105		−13.9%
1850	2,028		−3.7%
1860	2,012		−0.8%
1870	1,880		−6.6%
1880	1,889		0.5%
1890	1,672		−11.5%
1900	1,448		−13.4%
1910	1,343		−7.3%
1920	1,215		−9.5%
1930	1,050		−13.6%
1940	1,125		7.1%
1950	1,026		−8.8%
1960	1,203		17.3%
1970	1,261		4.8%
1980	1,268		0.6%
1990	1,315		3.7%
2000	1,285		−2.3%
2010	1,368		6.5%
2016 (est.)	1,351		−1.2%
U.S. Decennial Census

As of the census of 2000, there were 1,286 people, 465 households, and 352 families residing in the town. The population density was 31.3 inhabitants per square mile (12.1/km^{2}). There were 535 housing units at an average density of 13.0 per square mile (5.0/km^{2}). The racial makeup of the town was 97.59% White, 0.23% African American, 0.47% Asian, 0.78% from other races, and 0.93% from two or more races. Hispanic or Latino of any race were 1.56% of the population.

There were 465 households, out of which 36.1% had children under the age of 18 living with them, 61.5% were married couples living together, 8.2% had a female householder with no husband present, and 24.3% were non-families. 20.0% of all households were made up of individuals, and 6.7% had someone living alone who was 65 years of age or older. The average household size was 2.77 and the average family size was 3.13.

In the town, the population was spread out, with 29.2% under the age of 18, 7.9% from 18 to 24, 27.8% from 25 to 44, 23.3% from 45 to 64, and 11.9% who were 65 years of age or older. The median age was 37 years. For every 100 females, there were 100.6 males. For every 100 females age 18 and over, there were 99.6 males.

The median income for a household in the town was $41,184, and the median income for a family was $44,375. Males had a median income of $28,967 versus $21,908 for females. The per capita income for the town was $16,254. About 5.5% of families and 7.6% of the population were below the poverty line, including 12.1% of those under age 18 and 2.6% of those age 65 or over.

== Communities and locations in Venice ==
- Ashland – A hamlet at the northeastern corner of the town at Owasco Lake.
- Bruton Corners – A location south of Venice Center on NY-34.
- Cascade – A hamlet in the northeast of the town on NY-38.
- East Venice – A hamlet in the southeastern part of the town.
- Holley Corners – A location in the southeastern part of Venice.
- Ledyard – A hamlet on NY-34B at the western town line.
- Owasco Hill – A hamlet by the eastern town boundary.
- Poplar Ridge – A hamlet in the western part of Venice on NY-34B.
- Rafferty Corners – A location in the southeastern part of Venice.
- Stewarts Corners – A hamlet east of Venice Center.
- Tait Corners – A location east of Ledyard in the southwestern part of Venice.
- Venice Center – A hamlet on NY-34 near the center of the town.
- Wheeler Corners – A location on NY-34B by the western town boundary.
