= Throop, New York =

- Town
- Motto: Small town atmosphere, outstanding quality of life
- Location in Cayuga County and New York

- Location within New York Location within the United States
- Coordinates: 42°58′47″N 76°36′35″W
- Country: United States
- State: New York
- County: Cayuga
- Settled: 1790
- Created: 1859

Government
  - Type: Town Council
  - Town Supervisor: Eric Ridley
  - Town Council: Members' List: • Cheryl A. Guariglia (D); • Thomas Paczkowski (R); • Richard Signorelli (R); • Michael Vitale (R)

Area
  - Total: 18.70 sq mi (48.42 km^{2})
  - Land: 18.59 sq mi (48.14 km^{2})
  - Water: 0.11 sq mi (0.29 km^{2})
- Elevation: 620 ft (189 m)

Population (2010)
  - Total: 1,990
  - Estimate (2016): 1,958
  - Density: 105.4/sq mi (40.68/km^{2})
- Time zone: UTC-5 (Eastern (EST))
  - Summer (DST): UTC-4 (EDT)
- ZIP Codes: 13021 (Auburn); 13140 (Port Byron)
- Area code: 315
- FIPS code: 36-011-73770
- GNIS feature ID: 0979544
- Website: www.throopny.gov

Throop (/ˈtruːp/ TROOP) is a town in Cayuga County, New York, United States. The town is at the northern city line of Auburn and is in the Finger Lakes region of New York. The population was 1,990 at the 2010 census. The town is named after former New York Governor Enos T. Throop, a resident of Cayuga County.

== History ==
Settlement of the area that is now Throop was commenced by Ezekiel Crane and his son, Shadrach in 1790

The area was used for hunting by the Cayuga people. Throop was within the Central New York Military Tract, reserved for war veterans. Settlement began circa 1790.

The town of Throop was formed in 1859 from parts of the towns of Aurelius, Mentz and Sennett. The town is best known for the wide variety of colorful houses found throughout its various neighborhoods. These colors can range anywhere from a muted taupe to a bronzed eggshell.

== Geography ==
According to the United States Census Bureau, the town has a total area of 18.7 square miles (48.4 km^{2}), of which 18.6 square miles (48.1 km^{2}) is land and 0.12 square miles (0.3 km^{2}), or 0.59%, is water.

New York State Route 38 is a north–south highway in Throop.

The Owasco Outlet is a small river flowing northward through Throop from Owasco Lake towards the Seneca River.

== Demographics ==
Historical population
Census	Pop.	Note	%±
1860	1,348		—
1870	1,302		−3.4%
1880	1,188		−8.8%
1890	1,056		−11.1%
1900	1,038		−1.7%
1910	960		−7.5%
1920	958		−0.2%
1930	990		3.3%
1940	1,083		9.4%
1950	1,251		15.5%
1960	1,559		24.6%
1970	1,757		12.7%
1980	1,797		2.3%
1990	1,792		−0.3%
2000	1,824		1.8%
2010	1,990		9.1%
2016 (est.)	1,958		−1.6%
U.S. Decennial Census

As of the census of 2000, there were 1,824 people, 700 households, and 539 families residing in the town. The population density was 97.8 inhabitants per square mile (37.8/km^{2}). There were 731 housing units at an average density of 39.2 per square mile (15.1/km^{2}). The racial makeup of the town was 98.85% White, 0.27% African American, 0.27% Native American, 0.16% Asian, 0.22% from other races, and 0.22% from two or more races. Hispanic or Latino of any race were 0.93% of the population.

There were 700 households, out of which 30.9% had children under the age of 18 living with them, 65.3% were married couples living together, 8.3% had a female householder with no husband present, and 23.0% were non-families. 19.3% of all households were made up of individuals, and 9.1% had someone living alone who was 65 years of age or older. The average household size was 2.61 and the average family size was 2.95.

In the town, the population was spread out, with 23.1% under the age of 18, 5.8% from 18 to 24, 28.4% from 25 to 44, 27.6% from 45 to 64, and 15.0% who were 65 years of age or older. The median age was 40 years. For every 100 females, there were 102.7 males. For every 100 females age 18 and over, there were 97.2 males.

The median income for a household in the town was $46,065, and the median income for a family was $51,346. Males had a median income of $37,432 versus $24,758 for females. The per capita income for the town was $19,799. About 1.3% of families and 3.2% of the population were below the poverty line, including 3.5% of those under age 18 and 2.1% of those age 65 or over.

== Communities and locations in Throop ==
- Cold Spring – A hamlet at the northern edge of Auburn on NY-38.
- Polk Corners – A location west of Throopsville.
- Sawyers Corner – A hamlet north of Auburn on NY-38.
- Throop – The hamlet of Throop is east of Sawyers Corner by the eastern town line.
- Throopsville – A hamlet west of Sawyers Corners by the Owasco Outlet. The community was first settled in 1799.
