= 1800 United States census =

Second US census

- August 4, 1800
- Seal of the United States Marshals Service, which administered the census

General information
- Country: United States
- Authority: Office of the United States Marshal

Results
- Total population: 5,308,483 (▲35.1%)
- Most populous state: Virginia; 886,149
- Least populous state: Delaware; 64,273

The 1800 United States census was the second census conducted in the United States. It was conducted on August 4, 1800. It showed that 5,308,483 people were living in the United States, of whom 893,602 were slaves. The 1800 census included the new District of Columbia. The census for the following states were lost: Georgia, Kentucky, New Jersey, Tennessee, and Virginia.

In comparison to the 1790 census, the 1800 census gathered additional information. The census was published in December 1801 and cost $66,109.04.

== Census questions ==
The 1800 census asks the following information in columns, left to right:

Column	Title
1	Name of the head
2	Number of free white males under age 10
3	Number of free white males of age 10 and under 16
4	Number of free white males of age 16 and under 26
5	Number of free white males of age 26 and under 45
6	Number of free white males of age 45 and over.
7	Number of free white females under age 10
8	Number of free white females of age 10 and under 16
9	Number of free white females of age 16 and under 26
10	Number of free white females of age 26 and under 45
11	Number of free white females of age 45 and over.
12	Number of all other free persons
13	Number of slaves

This census is one of the several for which some of the original data are no longer available. Original census returns for Georgia, Kentucky, Mississippi, New Jersey, Tennessee, and Virginia were lost over the years.

== Data availability ==
No microdata from the 1800 population census are available, but aggregate data for small areas, together with compatible cartographic boundary files, can be downloaded from the National Historical Geographic Information System.

== State and regional populations ==
District	Free white males under age 10,	Free white males age 10–16	Free white males age 16–26	Free white males age 26–45	Free white males over age 45	Free white females under age 10	Free white females age 10–16	Free white females age 16–26	Free white females age 26–45	Free white females over age 45	All other free persons	Slaves	Total
New Hampshire	30,694	14,881	16,379	17,589	11,715	29,871	14,193	17,153	18,381	12,142	852	8	183,858
Massachusetts	63,646	32,507	37,905	39,729	31,348	60,920	30,674	40,491	43,833	35,340	6,452	0	422,845
Maine	27,970	12,305	12,900	15,318	8,339	26,899	11,338	13,295	14,496	8,041	818	0	151,719
Connecticut	37,946	19,408	21,683	23,180	18,976	35,736	18,218	23,561	25,186	20,827	5,330	951	251,002
Vermont	29,420	12,046	13,242	16,544	8,076	28,272	11,366	12,606	15,287	7,049	557	0	154,465
Rhode Island	9,945	5,352	5,889	5,785	4,887	9,524	5,026	6,463	6,919	5,648	3,304	380	69,122
New York (excluding Duchess, Ulster, Orange counties)	83,161	36,953	40,045	52,454	25,497	79,154	32,822	39,086	47,710	23,161	8,573	15,602	484,065
New York (Duchess, Ulster, Orange counties)	16,936	7,320	9,230	9,140	6,358	16,319	6,649	9,030	8,701	5,490	1,801	5,011	101,985
New Jersey	33,900	15,859	16,301	19,956	12,629	32,622	14,827	17,018	19,533	11,600	4,402	12,422	211,149
Pennsylvania (eastern district)	52,767	24,438	29,393	33,864	20,824	51,176	23,427	29,879	30,892	19,329	11,253	557	327,979
Pennsylvania (western district)	50,459	21,623	24,869	25,469	17,761	48,448	20,362	24,095	22,954	14,066	3,311	1,149	274,566
Delaware	8,250	4,437	5,121	5,012	2,213	7,628	4,277	5,543	4,981	2,390	8,268	6,153	64,273
Maryland (including Washington County in the District of Columbia, but excluding parts of Baltimore County)	33,520	16,581	20,560	22,169	12,617	32,463	15,718	21,506	20,363	11,240	18,646	102,465	317,348
Maryland (additional return for Baltimore County)	567	226	318	343	249	517	222	375	318	199	41	847	4,276
Virginia (eastern district)	57,837	25,998	32,444	34,588	19,087	54,597	25,469	34,807	32,641	18,821	13,194	322,199	676,682
Virginia (western district)	34,601	14,502	16,264	15,674	11,134	32,726	13,366	15,923	3,632	15,169	1,930	23,597	203,518
Virginia (Alexandria and part of Fairfax County in the District of Columbia)	889	320	483	557	221	670	313	479	473	189	383	1,172	5,949
North Carolina	63,118	27,073	31,560	31,209	18,688	59,074	25,874	32,989	30,665	17,514	7,043	133,296	478,103
South Carolina	37,411	16,156	17,761	19,344	10,244	34,664	15,857	18,145	17,236	9,437	3,185	146,151	345,591
Georgia	19,841	8,469	9,787	10,914	4,957	18,407	7,914	9,243	8,835	3,894	1,919	59,699	162,686
Kentucky	37,274	14,045	15,705	17,699	9,238	34,949	13,433	15,524	14,934	7,075	741	40,343	220,959
Northwest Territory	9,362	3,647	4,636	4,833	1,955	8,644	3,353	3,861	3,342	1,395	337	0	45,365
Indiana Territory	854	347	466	645	262	791	280	424	393	115	163	135	5,641
Mississippi Territory	999	356	482	780	290	953	376	352	462	165	182	3,489	8,850

District	Free white males under age 10	Free white males age 10–16	Free white males age 16–26	Free white males age 26–45	Free white males over age 45	Free white females under age 10	Free white females age 10–16	Free white females age 16–26	Free white females age 26–45	Free white females over age 45	All other free persons	Slaves	Total
Uncorrected Total	741,367	334,849	383,423	422,795	257,526	705,024	315,354	391,848	392,167	250,296	102,685	875,626	5,172,312
Tennessee	19,227	7,194	8,282	8,352	4,125	18,450	7,042	8,554	6,992	3,491	309	13,584	105,602
Maryland corrected	36,751	17,743	21,929	23,553	13,712	34,703	16,787	22,915	21,725	12,180	19,987	107,707	349,692
Corrected Total	763,288	359,792	392,765	432,979	262,497	725,197	323,243	401,436	400,203	254,524	104,294	893,605	5,305,982

a: At the time of the 1800 census, the territory donated to form the District of Columbia was still being administered by the states of Maryland and Virginia. The state of Maryland included the population of the District under its control within its own return. The population of the District of Columbia within Maryland was 8,144 persons, including 5,672 whites, 400 free blacks, and 2,472 enslaved persons.

b: Persons 766 added to the particular items of this return.

c: This return has been received since the communication of the above Aggregate to Congress.

d: This return has also been since received, and is stated by the Marshal to be more correct than the first.

== City populations ==
Rank	City	State	Population	Region (2016)
01	New York	New York	60,515	Northeast
02	Philadelphia	Pennsylvania	41,220	Northeast
03	Baltimore	Maryland	26,514	South
04	Boston	Massachusetts	24,937	Northeast
05	Charleston	South Carolina	18,824	South
06	Northern Liberties	Pennsylvania	10,718	Northeast
07	Southwark	Pennsylvania	9,621	Northeast
08	Salem	Massachusetts	9,457	Northeast
09	Providence	Rhode Island	7,614	Northeast
10	Livingston	New York	7,405	Northeast
11	Norfolk	Virginia	6,926	South
12	Newport	Rhode Island	6,739	Northeast
13	Cambridge	New York	6,187	Northeast
14	Fishkill	New York	6,168	Northeast
15	Newburyport	Massachusetts	5,946	Northeast
16	Richmond	Virginia	5,737	South
17	Nantucket	Massachusetts	5,617	Northeast
18	Stonington	Connecticut	5,437	Northeast
19	Portsmouth	New Hampshire	5,339	Northeast
20	Gloucester	Massachusetts	5,313	Northeast
21	Albany	New York	5,289	Northeast
21	Schenectady	New York	5,289	Northeast
23	Marblehead	Massachusetts	5,211	Northeast
24	Clinton	New York	5,208	Northeast
25	Bridgewater	Massachusetts	5,200	Northeast
26	Canaan	New York	5,157	Northeast
27	New London	Connecticut	5,150	Northeast
28	Norwalk	Connecticut	5,146	Northeast
28	Savannah	Georgia	5,146	South
30	Middletown	Connecticut	5,001	Northeast
31	Watervliet	New York	4,992	Northeast
32	Alexandria	District of Columbia	4,971	South
33	Stephentown	New York	4,968	Northeast
34	Troy	New York	4,926	Northeast
35	Hartford	Connecticut	4,802	Northeast
36	Rehoboth	Massachusetts	4,743	Northeast
37	Paris	New York	4,721	Northeast
38	Hillsdale	New York	4,702	Northeast
39	Coxsackie	New York	4,676	Northeast
40	Kingston	New York	4,615	Northeast
41	Argyle	New York	4,597	Northeast
42	Rensselaerville	New York	4,560	Northeast
43	Oyster Bay	New York	4,548	Northeast
44	Middleborough	Massachusetts	4,458	Northeast
45	Claverack	New York	4,414	Northeast
46	Petersburgh	New York	4,412	Northeast
47	Lyme	Connecticut	4,380	Northeast
48	New Bedford	Massachusetts	4,361	Northeast
49	Kinderhook	New York	4,348	Northeast
50	Groton	Connecticut	4,302	Northeast
51	Lancaster	Pennsylvania	4,292	Northeast
52	Litchfield	Connecticut	4,285	Northeast
53	Pawling	New York	4,269	Northeast
54	Otsego	New York	4,224	Northeast
55	Whitestown	New York	4,212	Northeast
56	South Hempstead	New York	4,141	Northeast
57	Montgomery	New York	4,106	Northeast
58	Newbury	Massachusetts	4,076	Northeast
59	New Haven	Connecticut	4,049	Northeast
60	Brookhaven	New York	4,022	Northeast
60	Rhinebeck	New York	4,022	Northeast
62	Glocester	Rhode Island	4,009	Northeast
63	Wethersfield	Connecticut	3,992	Northeast
64	Johnstown	New York	3,932	Northeast
65	Huntington	New York	3,894	Northeast
66	Beverly	Massachusetts	3,881	Northeast
67	Taunton	Massachusetts	3,860	Northeast
68	Halfmoon	New York	3,851	Northeast
69	Warwick	New York	3,816	Northeast
70	Freehold	New York	3,812	Northeast
71	Beekman	New York	3,756	Northeast
72	Gilmanton	New Hampshire	3,752	Northeast
73	Fairfield	Connecticut	3,735	Northeast
74	Bethlehem	New York	3,733	Northeast
75	Chatham	New York	3,716	Northeast
76	Portland	Maine	3,704	Northeast
77	Wells	Massachusetts	3,692	Northeast
78	Schodack	New York	3,688	Northeast
79	Southampton	New York	3,670	Northeast
80	Earl	Pennsylvania	3,669	Northeast
81	Hudson	New York	3,664	Northeast
82	Lebanon	Connecticut	3,652	Northeast
83	Guilford	Connecticut	3,597	Northeast
84	Wallkill	New York	3,592	Northeast
85	Minisink	New York	3,584	Northeast
86	Milton	New York	3,553	Northeast
87	Plymouth	Massachusetts	3,524	Northeast
88	Petersburg	Virginia	3,521	South
89	Palatine	New York	3,512	Northeast
90	Berne	New York	3,486	Northeast
91	Pittstown	New York	3,483	Northeast
92	Norwich	Connecticut	3,476	Northeast
93	Greenbush	New York	3,472	Northeast
94	Preston	Connecticut	3,440	Northeast
95	South Kingstown	Rhode Island	3,438	Northeast
96	Falmouth	Massachusetts	3,422	Northeast
97	Evesham	New Jersey	3,381	Northeast
98	Saybrook	Connecticut	3,363	Northeast
99	Aurelius	New York	3,312	Northeast
100	Ipswich	Massachusetts	3,305	Northeast

== Images ==
Slaves as a percentage of the total population in 1800.
