= Thomas Madison =

Thomas Madison may refer to:

- Thomas Madison (politician) (1746–1798), soldier and politician in Revolutionary-era Virginia, and second cousin to U.S. President James Madison.
- Thomas Madison (settler), first settler of the city of Genoa, Illinois, United States.
- Thomas J. Madison Jr. (born 1966), administrator of the U.S. Federal Highway Administration.
