= Erie Canal Lock 52 Complex =

- U.S. National Register of Historic Places
- U.S. Historic district
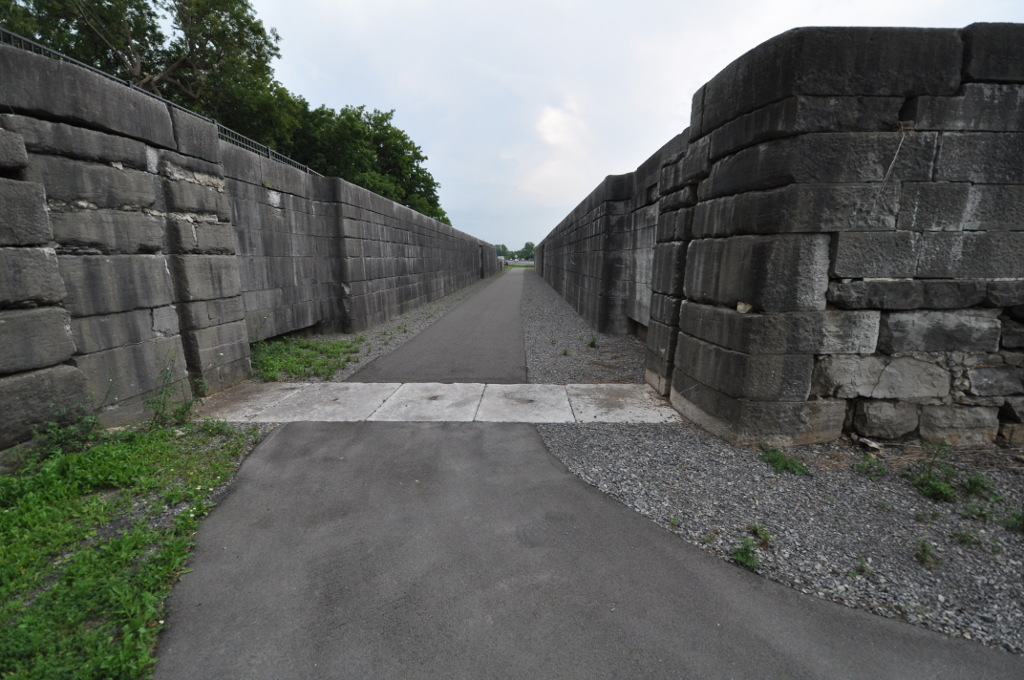
- View of the inside of one of the two locks

- Location within New York Location within the United States
- Location: Maiden Ln., Port Byron, New York
- Coordinates: 43°2′13″N 76°38′6″W
- Area: 3.4 acres (1.4 ha)
- Built: 1849
- Architect: Kasson, Joseph M.; et al.
- Architectural style: Italianate, Canal lock
- NRHP reference No.: 98001146
- Added to NRHP: September 03, 1998

Erie Canal Lock 52 Complex is a national historic district located at Port Byron and Mentz in Cayuga County, New York. The district includes two contributing buildings (the Erie House and the blacksmith shop / mule barn); three contributing engineering structures (Erie Canal Lock 52, culvert, and canal prism of the enlarged Erie Canal); and archaeological sites associated with the canal operations. Lock 52 was constructed 1849-1853 as part of the Enlarged Erie Canal program. It remained in operation until the rerouting of the canal under the New York State Barge Canal System in 1917. The Erie House was built in 1894 and is a two-story frame structure that housed a saloon and hotel.

It was listed on the National Register of Historic Places in 1998. The lock is now the centerpiece of a local historic park, accessible either from local streets, or from a rest area on the eastbound side of the New York State Thruway.
