= Fleming, New York =

- Town
- Location within Cayuga County and the state of New York

- Location within New York Location within the United States
- Coordinates: 42°52′16″N 76°34′39″W
- Country: United States
- State: New York
- County: Cayuga

Government
  - Type: Town Council
  - Town Supervisor: Donald Oltz (R)
  - Town Council: Members' List: • David Ward(R); • James Young (R); • Karen VanLiew (R); • Russell Bell (R)

Area
  - Total: 24.30 sq mi (62.93 km^{2})
  - Land: 21.82 sq mi (56.51 km^{2})
  - Water: 2.48 sq mi (6.42 km^{2})
- Elevation: 810 ft (247 m)

Population (2020)
  - Total: 2,475 ▼
  - Estimate (2021): 2,466
  - Density: 118.4/sq mi (45.71/km^{2})
- Time zone: UTC-5 (Eastern (EST))
  - Summer (DST): UTC-4 (EDT)
- ZIP Codes: 13021 (Auburn); 13160 (Union Springs); 13034 (Cayuga)
- Area code: 315
- FIPS code: 36-011-26231
- GNIS feature ID: 0978959
- Website: www.townoffleming.com

Fleming is a town in Cayuga County, New York, United States. The population was 2,475 at the 2020 census. The name is that of General George Fleming, an early settler. Fleming is at the northern end of Owasco Lake, south of Auburn.

== History ==
The area of Fleming was first settled circa 1790. The town was formed in 1823 from part of the town of Aurelius.

== Geography ==
Fleming is located south of the center of Cayuga County and is bordered to the north by the city of Auburn, the county seat. According to the United States Census Bureau, Fleming has a total area of 24.3 square miles (62.9 km^{2}), of which 21.8 square miles (56.5 km^{2}) is land and 2.5 square miles (6.4 km^{2}), or 10.21%, is water.

The eastern town line is defined by Owasco Lake, one of the Finger Lakes.

New York State Route 34 and New York State Route 38 are north-south highways in Fleming. NY-38 parallels the shore line of Owasco Lake, and NY-34 intersects with New York State Route 34B south of Fleming village. A short section of New York State Route 326 crosses the northwest corner of the town.

== Demographics ==
Historical population
Census	Pop.	Note	%±
1830	1,461		—
1840	1,317		−9.9%
1850	1,193		−9.4%
1860	1,231		3.2%
1870	1,207		−1.9%
1880	1,233		2.2%
1890	1,055		−14.4%
1900	1,076		2.0%
1910	1,017		−5.5%
1920	886		−12.9%
1930	987		11.4%
1940	1,259		27.6%
1950	1,502		19.3%
1960	2,071		37.9%
1970	2,242		8.3%
1980	2,394		6.8%
1990	2,644		10.4%
2000	2,647		0.1%
2010	2,636		−0.4%
2020	2,475		−6.1%
2021 (est.)	2,466		−0.4%
U.S. Decennial Census

As of the census of 2000, there were 2,647 people, 1,041 households, and 756 families residing in the town. The population density was 121.3 inhabitants per square mile (46.8/km^{2}). There were 1,153 housing units at an average density of 52.8 per square mile (20.4/km^{2}). The racial makeup of the town was 98.68% White, 0.15% African American, 0.11% Native American, 0.57% Asian, 0.15% from other races, and 0.34% from two or more races. Hispanic or Latino of any race were 0.79% of the population.

There were 1,041 households, out of which 30.8% had children under the age of 18 living with them, 61.7% were married couples living together, 7.2% had a female householder with no husband present, and 27.3% were non-families. 23.3% of all households were made up of individuals, and 10.8% had someone living alone who was 65 years of age or older. The average household size was 2.54 and the average family size was 2.99.

In the town, the population was spread out, with 23.1% under the age of 18, 6.4% from 18 to 24, 26.8% from 25 to 44, 27.7% from 45 to 64, and 16.0% who were 65 years of age or older. The median age was 41 years. For every 100 females, there were 101.6 males. For every 100 females age 18 and over, there were 101.6 males.

The median income for a household in the town was $49,363, and the median income for a family was $54,879. Males had a median income of $40,789 versus $28,182 for females. The per capita income for the town was $22,603. About 3.9% of families and 5.7% of the population were below the poverty line, including 4.2% of those under age 18 and 7.1% of those age 65 or over.

== Communities and locations in Fleming ==
- Fleming – The hamlet of Fleming is on NY-34. It was settled before 1798.
- Mapleton – A location on NY-34B in the southern part of the town.
- Sherlock Corners – A hamlet on NY-35 in the northern part of the town.
- Shumaker Crossing – A hamlet on NY-34 west of Sherlock Corners.
- Wyckoff (formerly Wyckoffs Station) – A hamlet in the southeastern corner of the town on NY-38 by Owasco Lake.

== Notable people ==
- William H. Carpenter, Fleming postmaster in the 1850s and later U.S. Consul to Fuzhou, China, 1861–1865
- Susan Ann Edson (1823-1897), personal physician to President James A. Garfield
