= New York State Route 34B =

State highway in central New York, US

New York State Route 34B
- Map of Finger Lakes region in central New York with NY 34B highlighted in red

Route information
- Auxiliary route of NY 34
- Maintained by NYSDOT
- Length: 34.03 mi (54.77 km)
- Existed: 1930–present

Major junctions
- South end: NY 38 in Dryden
- North end: NY 34 in Fleming

Location
- Country: United States
- State: New York
- Counties: Tompkins, Cayuga

Highway system
- New York Highways; Interstate; US; State; Reference; Parkways
← NY 34	→ NY 35
← NY 228	NY 229	→ NY 230

New York State Route 34B (NY 34B) is a north–south state highway located within Tompkins and Cayuga counties in Central New York in the United States. Its northern terminus is located at a junction with NY 34 by the hamlet of Fleming within the town of the same name in Cayuga County. The southern terminus is located at a junction with NY 38 in the town of Dryden in Tompkins County.

== Route description ==
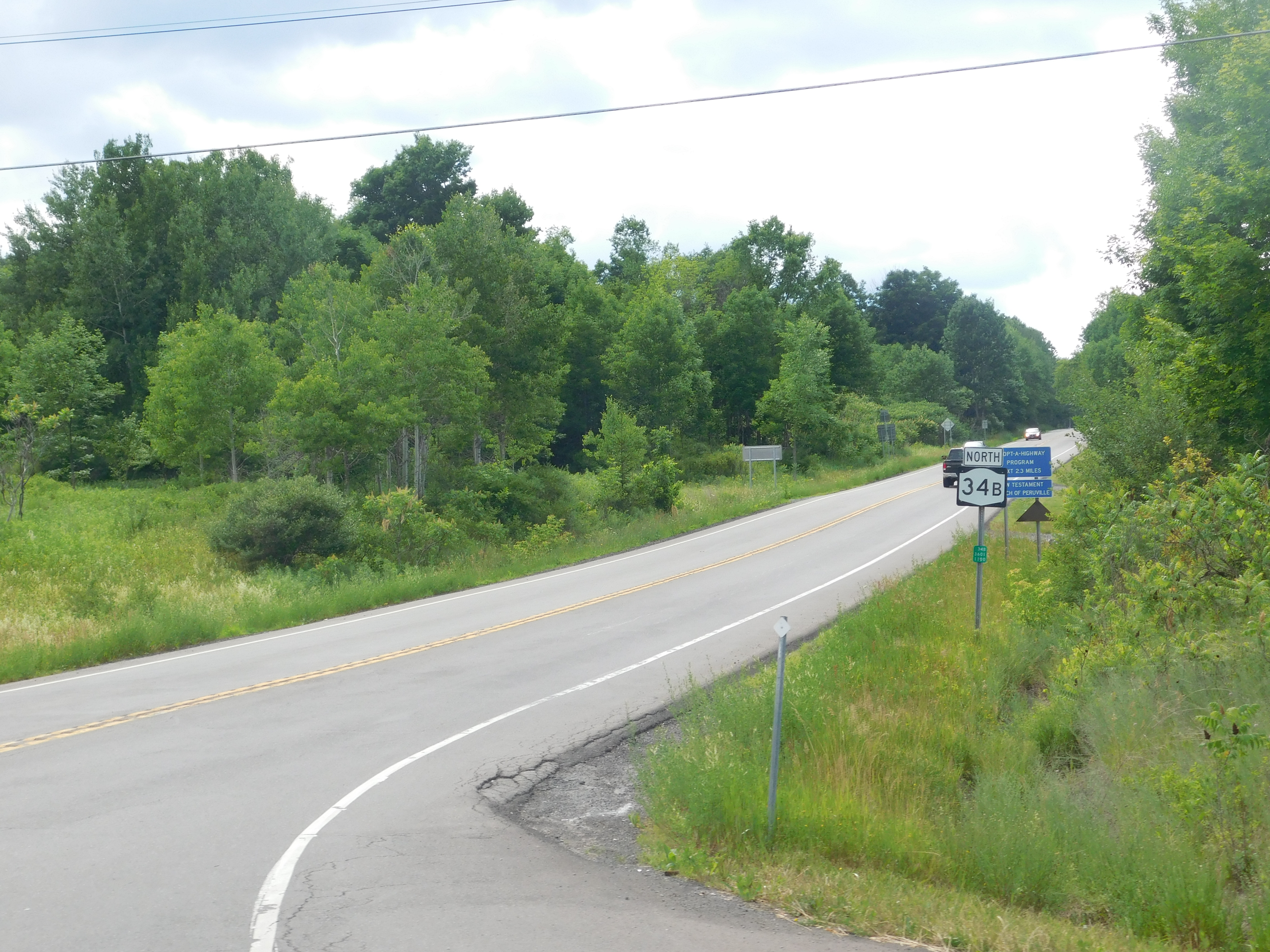
NY 34B running from NY 38 in Dryden

NY 34B begins at an intersection with NY 38 (Peru Road / Groton Road) in the town of Dryden, as a westward continuation of CR 107 (CR 107; Peruville Road). NY 34B proceeds west as Peruville Road before entering the town of Groton, the route crosses an intersection with CR 178 (Sobers Road). Now paralleling CR 107A (Old Peruville Road) to the south, NY 34B continues west as a two-lane rural highway. CR 107A merges into NY 34B a short distance west, while NY 34B continues, intersecting with the northern terminus of CR 182 (Sheldon Road). A short distance west of CR 182, NY 34B crosses back into the town of Dryden from Groton, entering the residential hamlet of Howland Corners.

NY 34B crosses southwest through the hamlet as a two-lane residential street, continuing west out of Howland Corners. A short distance later, NY 34B crosses into the town of Lansing, continuing west as a two-lane residential street. Crossing CR 122 (North Triphammer Road), before entering the hamlet of Terpening Corners, where NY 34 bends to the southwest and merges into NY 34B's right-of-way through Terpening Corners. The two concurrent routes progress west as a two-lane residential street, where NY 34 turns southward along East Shore Drive. NY 34B continues west, intersecting with CR 186 (Conlon Road). Now known as Ridge Road, NY 34B bends to the northwest as a two-lane residential street into the hamlet of Portland. Nearing the shores of Cayuga Lake, NY 34B crosses through the town of Lansing, crossing a creek and entering the hamlet of Myers.

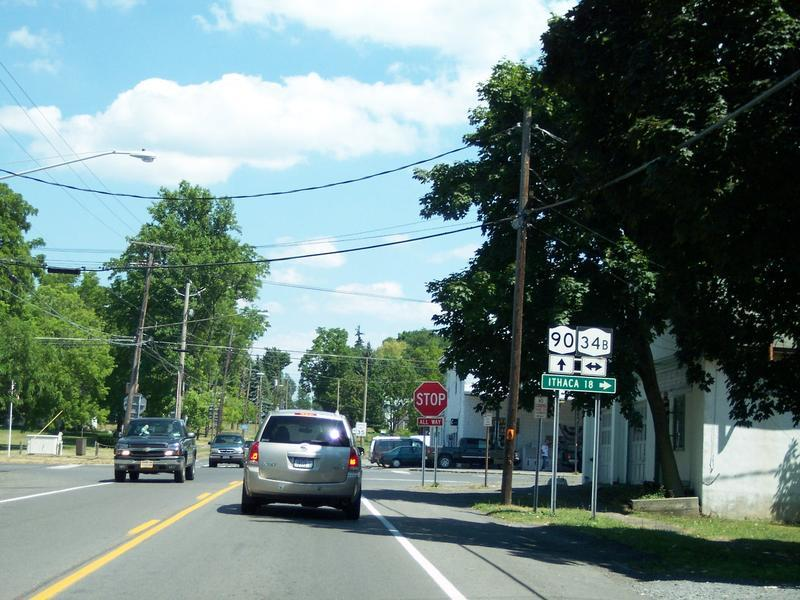
NY 90 through the hamlet of King Ferry, intersecting with NY 34B

Continuing northward, NY 34B winds through Lansing, entering the hamlet of Ludlowville. After turning to the northwest, CR 155 (Lansingville Road) intersects with NY 34B, paralleling several miles from the shore of Cayuga Lake. Continuing through Lansing, NY 34B becomes a mix of farms and residences, intersecting with CR 184 (Jerry Smith Road). NY 34B bends northward into the hamlet of Lake Ridge, intersecting with CR 189 (Fenner Road) and CR 185 (Lake Ridge Road), the latter of which forks to the northwest. A short distance from Lake Ridge, NY 34B leaves the town of Lansing for Genoa as it crosses the county line into Cayuga County. The route intersected with CR 32 (Atwater Road), continuing northward as a two-lane rural roadway. A short distance later, NY 34B enters the hamlet of King Ferry. In King Ferry, NY 34B is a two-lane residential street, intersecting with NY 90 at the center of the hamlet.

After King Ferry, NY 34B bends to the northwest as a two-lane rural roadway before crossing into the town of Venice. NY 34B soon enters the residential hamlet of Ledyard, intersecting with the western terminus of CR 45A (Ledyard Road) and the eastern terminus of CR 45B (Ledyard Road). Leaving Ledyard for the town of Venice once again, the route heads northward through farms, entering the hamlet of Poplar Ridge. In Poplar Ridge, NY 34B passes the Southern Cayuga Middle and High School and Emily Howland Elementary School, which are all three schools of the Southern Cayuga Central School District, before intersecting with CR 43B (Poplar Ridge Road). At the intersection with Dublin Hill Road, NY 34B leaves the town of Venice for the town of Scipio. In Scipio, NY 34B bends to the northwest, intersecting with CR 42B (Sherwood Road). Passing through farmlands, the route soon enters the hamlet of Scipioville, where it intersects with CR 44B (Center Road), passing several residences.

North of Scipioville, NY 34B continues northward as a two-lane rural roadway, entering the rural hamlet of Bunker. In Bunker, NY 34B intersects with the eastern terminus of CR 46 (Kings Corners Road). The route leaves Bunker, intersecting with CR 89 (Great Gully Road) in Scipio, before NY 34B bends to the northeast away from a fork at CR 76A (Ridge Road). A distance to the northeast, NY 34B crosses the town line of Fleming, where the two-lane street becomes residential, entering the hamlet of Mapleton. In Mapleton, CR 6B (Bluefield Road) terminates. The route bends to the northeast, becoming residential once again, where it intersects with NY 34 in Fleming. This intersection serves as the northern terminus of NY 34B, several miles west of Owasco Lake.

== History ==
New York State Route 229
- Location: Groton
- Existed: 1930–c. 1939

In 1908, the New York State Legislature created Route 11, an unsigned legislative route extending from Ithaca to Auburn via the hamlets of South Lansing, Lake Ridge, King Ferry, Scipioville, and Fleming. No route was assigned to the Ithaca–Auburn corridor when the first set of posted routes in New York were assigned in 1924; however, the primary north–south highway between the two cities was included as part of NY 40 by 1926. NY 40 followed a more easterly alignment than legislative Route 11 between South Lansing and Fleming, bypassing Lake Ridge, King Ferry, and Scipioville on what is now NY 34.

The NY 40 designation was reassigned to another highway in the Capital District as part of the 1930 renumbering of state highways in New York. Its former routing south of Cato became part of the new NY 34, which extended south through Ithaca to Waverly. At the same time, the former alignment of legislative Route 11 between South Lansing and Fleming was designated as NY 34B. Also assigned as part of the renumbering was NY 229, an extension of NY 34B east to NY 38 in the Groton hamlet of Peruville. NY 34B and NY 229 were separated by less than 1 mile (1.6 km) of NY 34. The NY 229 designation was removed c. 1939.

On April 1, 1980, the road from South Lansing to Peruville became a state highway once again as ownership and maintenance of the roadway was transferred from Tompkins County to the state of New York as part of a highway maintenance swap between the two levels of government. The new state highway became an extension of NY 34B.

== Major intersections ==
County	Location	mi	km	Destinations	Notes
Tompkins	Dryden–Groton town line	0.00	0.00	NY 38 (Peru Road / Groton Road) – Groton, Freeville	Southern terminus; Hamlet of Peruville
Tompkins	Town of Lansing	6.99	11.25	NY 34 north – Genoa, Auburn	Eastern terminus of NY 34 / NY 34B overlap; hamlet of Terpening Corners
Tompkins	Town of Lansing	7.47	12.02	NY 34 south – Ithaca	Western terminus of NY 34 / NY 34B overlap; hamlet of South Lansing
Cayuga	Genoa	19.33	31.11	NY 90 – Aurora	Hamlet of King Ferry
Cayuga	Fleming	34.03	54.77	NY 34 – Auburn	Northern terminus
1.000 mi = 1.609 km; 1.000 km = 0.621 mi: Concurrency terminus
