= Mentz, New York =

- Town
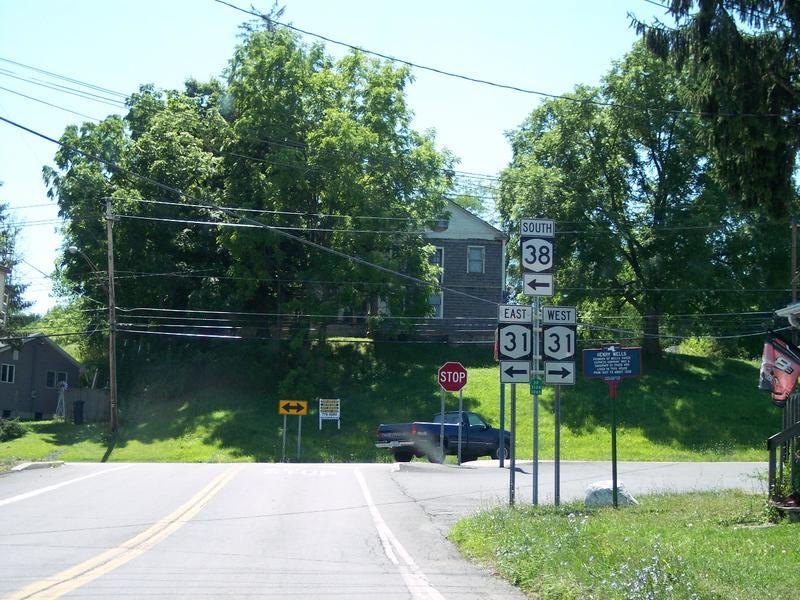
- Village of Port Byron

- Location within Cayuga County and New York

- Location within New York Location within the United States
- Coordinates: 43°2′25″N 76°37′44″W
- Country: United States
- State: New York
- County: Cayuga

Government
  - Type: Town Council
  - Town Supervisor: Mark Emerson (R)
  - Town Council: Members' List: • Thomas L. Guidone (R); • Joseph E. Felice, Jr. (R); • Jeffrey Mills (R); • Jack E. O'Neil (R)

Area
  - Total: 17.18 sq mi (44.50 km^{2})
  - Land: 16.92 sq mi (43.83 km^{2})
  - Water: 0.26 sq mi (0.67 km^{2})
- Elevation: 489 ft (149 m)

Population (2020)
  - Total: 2,114
- Time zone: UTC-5 (Eastern (EST))
  - Summer (DST): UTC-4 (EDT)
- ZIP Codes: 13140 (Port Byron); 13166 (Weedsport)
- FIPS code: 36-011-46602
- GNIS feature ID: 0979209
- Website: townofmentz.com

Mentz is a town in Cayuga County, New York, United States. The population was 2,114 at the 2020 census. The town is in the central part of the county, 7 miles north of Auburn.The origin of the town's name has never been determined, but it is locally believed that it derived from Mainz, in Germany.

== History ==
The town was formed in 1802 as the "Town of Jefferson" from the town of Aurelius while still part of Onondaga County. On March 30, 1808, the town was renamed to Mentz, as too many towns, villages, and a county had taken the name of Jefferson to honor the past president. The town is part of the Military Tract, and much of the land was given to soldiers who had served in the Revolutionary War. The first settlers built their homes around the Owasco Outlet, which is the outflow of Owasco Lake, one of the smaller Finger Lakes. The Owasco Outlet flows to the Seneca River, which serves as the northern border of the town. The settlers used the Outlet for transportation and for milling.

The Erie Canal was built through the town in 1819 and was opened to traffic in 1820, with service between Montezuma and Utica. The new Erie Canal fostered rapid growth and the settlement that had built up around the Outlet was given the name of Bucksville. The post office was given the name of Port Byron to honor the late poet Lord Byron, and soon Bucksville was renamed as Port Byron. On March 2, 1837, the community of Port Byron set itself apart from Mentz by incorporating as a village.

The town also had a number of smaller communities.

In 1859 the town of Mentz was divided into Mentz, Montezuma and Throop.

Today, the town serves mostly as a bedroom community for the cities of Auburn, Syracuse and Rochester.

== Transportation ==
In 1853, the New York Central Railroad was constructed through the northern lands of the town, about one mile north of the village. A depot and hotel were built along the tracks and the area was given the name of North Port Byron.

in 1884, the New York, West Shore and Buffalo Railway was built through the town, closely following the route of its competitor, the New York Central. The "West Shore" built a depot on the northern border of the village. Service ended on the West Shore in the 1950s.

The Rochester, Syracuse and Eastern Interurban was built through the town in 1907. The company went out of business in 1931.

The towpath version of the Erie Canal was enlarged in 1857 and again in 1896. In 1917, the Erie Canal was moved to the canalized Seneca River, where it remains today.

The east–west NY Route 31, which was the old Montezuma Turnpike, passes through the center of the town and village of Port Byron. The north–south NY Route 38 passes through the town and village.

The New York State Thruway was constructed in the 1950s and passes through the town on an east–west alignment, closely following the route of the Erie Canal. The nearest access exit, Exit 40, is 4 miles to the east in Weedsport. The Port Byron Service Plaza is located two miles west of the village near the Mentz/Montezuma border. The Old Erie Canal Heritage Park was built as an attraction on the Thruway and lies on the western border of the village.

== Notable people ==
- John W. DeGroff, Wisconsin politician, born in Mentz
- Isaac Singer, sewing machine manufacturer
- Henry Wells, partner in Wells-Fargo
- Brigham Young, the Mormon leader, lived briefly in the town between 1825 and 1829. The house he rented still stands and is owned by the Brigham Young family. He also built a second house in the village, which also remains in use.
- In 1997, town supervisor Bill Jones was convicted of official misconduct and a gun charge, but vanished before his sentencing. He hid in southern Ohio with his girlfriend, at one point living on land owned by Fredericka Wagner, who was implicated in the Pike County shootings. In January 2021 he was arrested after being taken to a hospital and remanded to New York State.

== Geography ==
According to the United States Census Bureau, the town has a total area of 17.2 square miles (44.5 km^{2}), of which 16.9 square miles (43.8 km^{2}) is land and 0.27 square miles (0.7 km^{2}), or 1.51%, is water.

The northern town line is defined by the Seneca River.

== Demographics ==
Historical population
Census	Pop.	Note	%±
1820	3,010		—
1830	4,144		37.7%
1840	4,215		1.7%
1850	5,239		24.3%
1860	2,232		−57.4%
1870	2,278		2.1%
1880	2,288		0.4%
1890	1,952		−14.7%
1900	1,914		−1.9%
1910	1,909		−0.3%
1920	1,758		−7.9%
1930	1,553		−11.7%
1940	1,677		8.0%
1950	1,783		6.3%
1960	2,105		18.1%
1970	2,338		11.1%
1980	2,441		4.4%
1990	2,453		0.5%
2000	2,446		−0.3%
2010	2,378		−2.8%
U.S. Decennial Census

As of the census of 2000, there were 2,446 people, 932 households, and 676 families residing in the town. The population density was 143.5 inhabitants per square mile (55.4/km^{2}). There were 999 housing units at an average density of 58.6 per square mile (22.6/km^{2}). The racial makeup of the town was 96.52% White, 0.94% African American, 0.41% Native American, 0.16% Asian, 0.65% from other races, and 1.31% from two or more races. Hispanic or Latino of any race were 1.64% of the population.

There were 932 households, out of which 32.6% had children under the age of 18 living with them, 52.7% were married couples living together, 13.8% had a female householder with no husband present, and 27.4% were non-families. 21.7% of all households were made up of individuals, and 10.3% had someone living alone who was 65 years of age or older. The average household size was 2.61 and the average family size was 2.99.

In the town, the population was spread out, with 25.8% under the age of 18, 7.8% from 18 to 24, 29.0% from 25 to 44, 23.2% from 45 to 64, and 14.1% who were 65 years of age or older. The median age was 37 years. For every 100 females, there were 94.6 males. For every 100 females age 18 and over, there were 93.8 males.

The median income for a household in the town was $34,398, and the median income for a family was $36,637. Males had a median income of $31,500 versus $20,172 for females. The per capita income for the town was $15,494. About 9.4% of families and 11.8% of the population were below the poverty line, including 12.3% of those under age 18 and 13.5% of those age 65 or over.

== Communities and locations in Mentz ==
- Haydenville was built 2 miles south of Port Byron on the bank of the Owasco Outlet. This settlement was built around a large woolen mill that used the outlet for power and production.
- Throopsville was another milling place along the Owasco Outlet, about 5 miles south of Port Byron.
- Centerport was built on the east side of the town along the Erie Canal. The name was taken as it was centered between Weedsport and Port Byron. The principle industry was the manufacture of grain cradles, using water from a canal feeder as power for the mill. Centerport also served as shipping point on the canal.
- Montezuma was located about 3 miles west of Port Byron on the bank of the Seneca River. The early settlement was a shipping center on the Seneca river, which was the principle east–west transportation route prior to the construction of the Erie Canal. The hamlet was also known for its salt production from brine wells.
- High Bridge / Fox Ridge was an area along the New York Central Railroad.
- North Port Byron – A hamlet north of Port Byron village on NY Route 38.
- Port Byron – The village of Port Byron is at the intersection of NY-31 and NY-38, immediately south of the Thruway. Port Byron grew to prominence as a port on the Erie Canal, but the canal was abandoned in 1917 when the route was moved to the Seneca River.

== See also ==
- Mentz (disambiguation)
