= New York State Route 90 =

Highway in New York

New York State Route 90
- Map of central New York with NY 90 highlighted in red

Route information
- Maintained by NYSDOT
- Length: 53.05 mi (85.38 km)
- Existed: 1930–present

Major junctions
- South end: US 11 / NY 41 in Homer
- NY 34 in Genoa; US 20 / NY 5 in Montezuma
- North end: NY 31 in Montezuma

Location
- Country: United States
- State: New York
- Counties: Cortland, Cayuga

Highway system
- New York Highways; Interstate; US; State; Reference; Parkways
| ← I-90 | → I-90N |

New York State Route 90 (NY 90) is a north–south state highway in the Finger Lakes region of New York in the United States. All but five of the route's 53 miles (85 km) are located in Cayuga County, with the remaining 5 miles (8 km) situated in Cortland County. The southern terminus of the route is at an intersection with U.S. Route 11 (US 11) and NY 41 in the village of Homer. Its northern terminus is at a junction with NY 31 in the town of Montezuma. Although the route is signed as north–south, the portion of NY 90 from King Ferry to Homer follows an east–west alignment.

It is not to be confused with Interstate 90 (I-90), which also passes through Montezuma. The two 90s in fact cross, the only time when two same numbered highways intersect in the state, but there is no access between them.

== Route description ==
=== Homer to Ledyard ===
NY 90 begins at an intersection with US 11 and NY 41 in the village of Homer. NY 90 proceeds westward along Cayuga Street through the residential center of the village, crossing an intersection with NY 281 (South West Street). After NY 281, NY 90 turns northwest past Glenwood Cemetery and out of the village of Homer into the town of Homer. The route becomes a more rural roadway, soon running along the New York State Route 90 Scenic Byway, turning southwest into a junction with Kinney Gulf Road (CR 111). After a short dart to the southwest, NY 90 leaves Cortland County for Cayuga.

Now in the town of Summerhill, the route bends westward near a junction with Hinman Road (CR 163). After crossing over a creek, the route passes the southern terminus of Lake Como Road (CR 62C). NY 90 continues west through the rural town of Summerhill, passing numerous farms before bending southwest into the residential hamlet of Summerhill. At the center of the hamlet, the route reaches a junction with Salt Road (CR 102). Turning northwest out of Summerhill hamlet, the route reaches a junction with Chipmans Corners Road (CR 161).

Now in the town of Locke, NY 90 proceeds northwest past the southern terminus of Toll Gate Road (CR 54) before gaining the moniker of Water Street as the route enters the hamlet of Locke. The main west–east street through Locke, NY 90 junctions with NY 38 (Main Street). NY 90 makes a sharp bend to the southwest, keeping the Water Street until leaving the hamlet of Locke at Maple Avenue. Winding southwest out of Locke, NY 90 parallels Hemlock Creek past a junction with Bird Cemetery Road (CR 51). The route then continues southwest past Goodrich Hill Road (CR 160) and soon bends westward for a short distance.

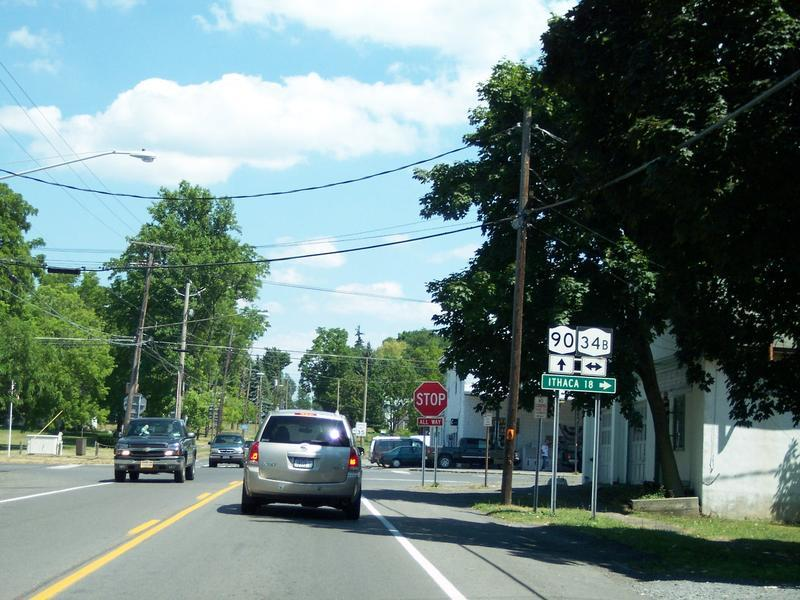
NY 90 at NY 34B in King Ferry

Soon turning to the northwest, the route climbs the hills towards the hamlet of Goosetree. Just east of Goosetree, the route turns northward at a junction with Goose Street (CR 159) before crossing into the town of Genoa. Running north through Genoa, NY 90 crosses west through the hamlet of Pine Hollow. The two-lane rural roadway continues west past the northern terminus of East Genoa Road (CR 26E). Passing south of Genoa Rural Cemetery and soon reaching the hamlet of Genoa, where the route junctions with NY 34 at the easternmost end of the community. Crossing west through the residential hamlet, NY 90 crosses Maple Street at the center, leaving just west of North Street.

Crossing west through the town of Genoa, NY 90 crosses a junction with Indian Field Road (CR 34) and past some residences in Little Hollow. Crossing west out of Little Hollow, the route reaches the hamlet of King Ferry, where NY 90 becomes a two-lane residential street into a junction with NY 34B. West of NY 34B, NY 90 crosses west through the residential edges of King Ferry before reaching a junction with Clearview Road (CR 31B), where it turns northwestward through the town of Genoa before leaving the community for the town of Ledyard. Crossing northwest through Ledyard, NY 90 passes numerous farms as it nears the eastern shores of Cayuga Lake.

=== Ledyard to Montezuma ===
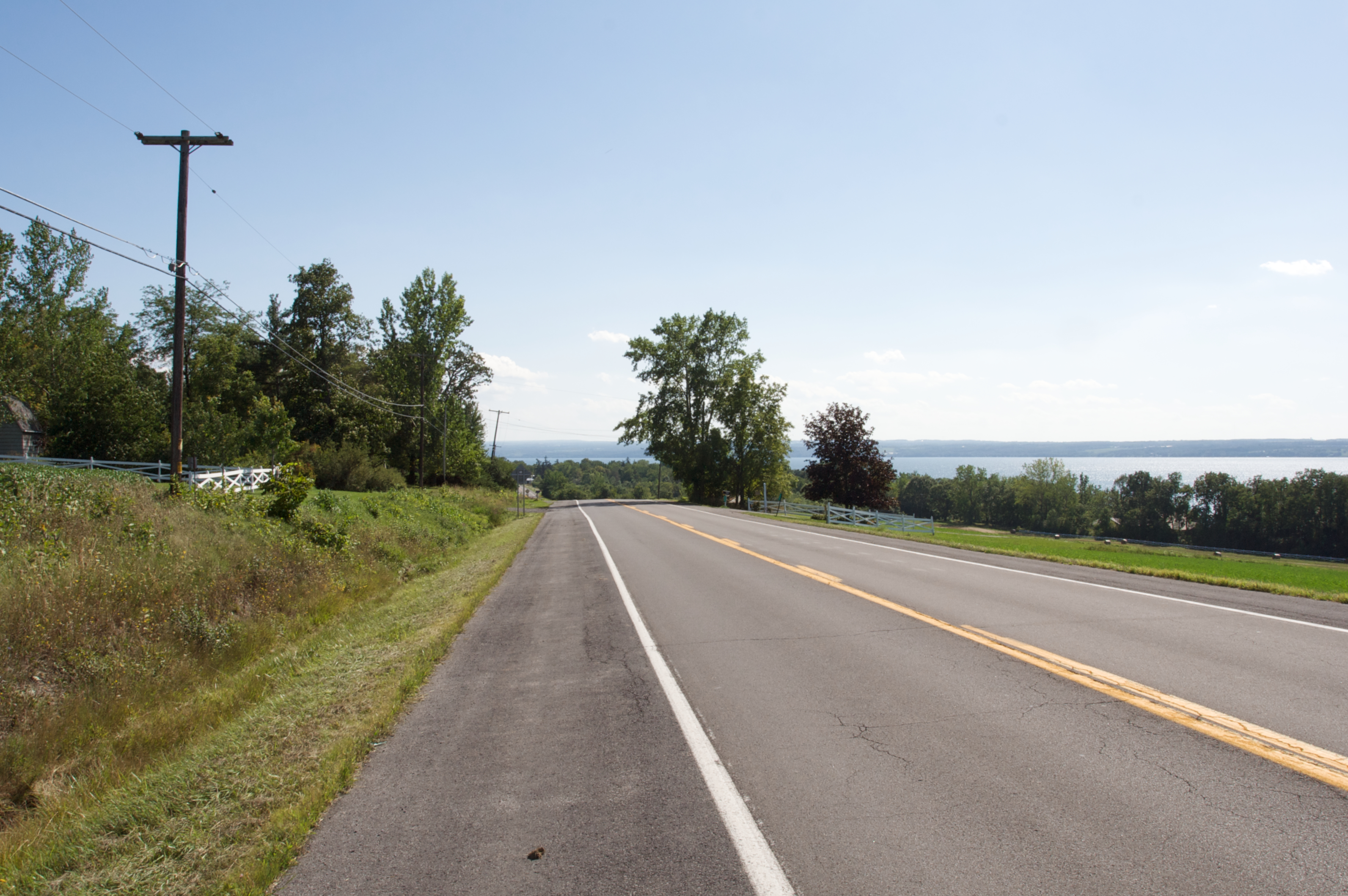
Southbound NY 90 between Levanna and Union Springs

Continuing northwest, NY 90 crosses past the western terminus of Ledyard Road (CR 45A). The route bends east of Long Point State Park-Cayuga Lake. Reaching a junction with Lake Road, the route crosses into the village of Aurora, a lakeside area along NY 90. Running along the eastern shores of Cayuga Lake, NY 90 crosses through the campus of Wells College and becomes a two-lane residential lakeside roadway. Crossing through the center of Aurora, NY 90 gains the Main Street moniker and turning northward along the shoreline. The route soon leaves Aurora for the town of Ledyard once again, reaching the hamlet of Levanna. Through Levanna, NY 90 is a two-lane residential roadway, passing a junction with the western terminus of Levanna Road (CR 44A).

Turning northeast out of Levanna, NY 90 parallels the Cayuga Lake shoreline as a two-lane rural roadway. Just north of Great Gully Cove Road, the route enters the town of Springport, winding northward through the hamlet of Farleys before reaching the village of Union Springs. Through Union Springs, NY 90 gains the moniker of South Cayuga Street, becoming a two-lane residential/commercial street through the village. Passing east of a pond, the route continues north through Union Springs, now boasting the North Cayuga Street moniker until a junction with the western terminus of NY 326 and back into the town of Springport. Continuing north through Springport, NY 90 becomes a rural roadway along Cayuga Lake again, reaching the hamlet of Cross Roads.

Soon crossing into the town of Aurelius, NY 90 crosses over railroad tracks and begin paralleling them past a junction with Lake Street (CR 2A). Passing the entrance into Lakeview Cemetery, NY 90 enters the village of Cayuga. Running north along Court Street, NY 90 runs along the eastern end of the village, changing names to Willard Street at Genesee Street, soon returning to the shoreline and soon back into the town of Aurelius. Running north along the shoreline, NY 90 continues through Aurelius, passing numerous lakeside communities before winding north into the town of Montezuma. In Montezuma, NY 90 reaches a junction with US 20 and NY 5 (Clark Street Road).

Continuing northward as the county line approaches, NY 90 parallels it on a northeastward trek through Montezuma. Turning northward, the route comes within feet of the New York State Thruway (I-90) and bends eastward as it crosses on a parallel for several blocks. Reaching a junction with Fuller Road (CR 142), where NY 90 turns northward and crosses over the Thruway. North of the Thruway, NY 90 crosses through the hamlet of Montezuma, and reaches a junction with NY 31. This junction marks as the northern terminus of NY 90, which continues north of NY 31 toward Fox Ridge.

== History ==
The earliest predecessor to NY 90 was the fifth segment of the Great Western Turnpike, chartered in 1814 to run from Homer to Cayuga Lake. At its western terminus, ferries took travellers to points opposite on the lake.

NY 90 was assigned as part of the 1930 renumbering of state highways in New York. It originally began at US 11 in the hamlet of Messengerville and passed through Virgil, Cortland to King Ferry, where it ran along the eastern edge of Cayuga Lake to its terminus at NY 31 in Montezuma. In Cortland, NY 90 had an overlap with NY 13 along Tompkins Street from Owego Street to Main Street. At Main Street, NY 90 turned north to follow US 11 and NY 41 to Homer, where NY 90 split from the two routes and headed west toward Cayuga County.

In the early 1980s, the state of New York assumed maintenance of an east–west highway connecting NY 90 in Virgil to the village of Dryden. Around the same time, NY 90 was truncated on its southern end to its junction with US 11 and NY 41 in Homer. The Dryden–Virgil highway and NY 90's former routing from Virgil to Messengerville became NY 392; from Virgil to Cortland, old NY 90 was redesignated as NY 215. Today, at least two signs showing NY 90 signed concurrently with US 11 and NY 41 still exist in the village of Homer as remnants of its former southward extension.

== Major intersections ==
| County | Location | mi | km | Destinations | Notes |
|---|---|---|---|---|---|
| Cortland | Village of Homer | 0.00 | 0.00 | US 11 / NY 41 | Southern terminus |
| Cortland | Village of Homer | 0.63 | 1.01 | NY 281 (South West Street) to I-81 | |
| Cayuga | Locke | 13.52 | 21.76 | NY 38 (Main Street) | |
| Cayuga | Town of Genoa | 20.26 | 32.61 | NY 34 | Hamlet of Genoa |
| Cayuga | Town of Genoa | 24.82 | 39.94 | NY 34B – Ithaca | Hamlet of King Ferry |
| Cayuga | Union Springs | 40.77 | 65.61 | NY 326 east | Western terminus of NY 326 |
| Cayuga | Montezuma | 48.58 | 78.18 | US 20 / NY 5 (Clark Street Road) to New York Thruway – Seneca Falls, Auburn | |
| Cayuga | Montezuma | 53.05 | 85.38 | NY 31 to New York Thruway | Northern terminus; hamlet of Montezuma |
1.000 mi = 1.609 km; 1.000 km = 0.621 mi
