= King Ferry, New York =

- Hamlet
- Location within New York Location within the United States
- Coordinates: 42°39′55″N 76°37′00″W
- Country: United States
- State: New York
- County: Cayuga
- Elevation: 955 ft (291 m)
- Time zone: UTC-5 (Eastern (EST))
  - Summer (DST): UTC-4 (EDT)
- ZIP code: 13081
- Area codes: 315 & 680
- GNIS feature ID: 954632

King Ferry is a hamlet in the town of Genoa, Cayuga County, New York, United States. The community is located at the intersection of New York State Route 90 and New York State Route 34B, 16.4 miles (26.4 km) north of Ithaca. King Ferry has a post office with ZIP code 13081, which opened on December 15, 1807. King Ferry sits along Cayuga Lake, which is part of the Finger Lakes.

== History ==
The "King Family" ran a ferry (hencing its name) across Cayuga. The terminal was named "King's Ferry Station" and the post office which opened around in 1807.

== Name ==
King Ferry was named for the King family.

== Northville ==
Northville was King Ferry's former name, used until 1827.

The Finger Lakes
