= Springport, New York =

- Town
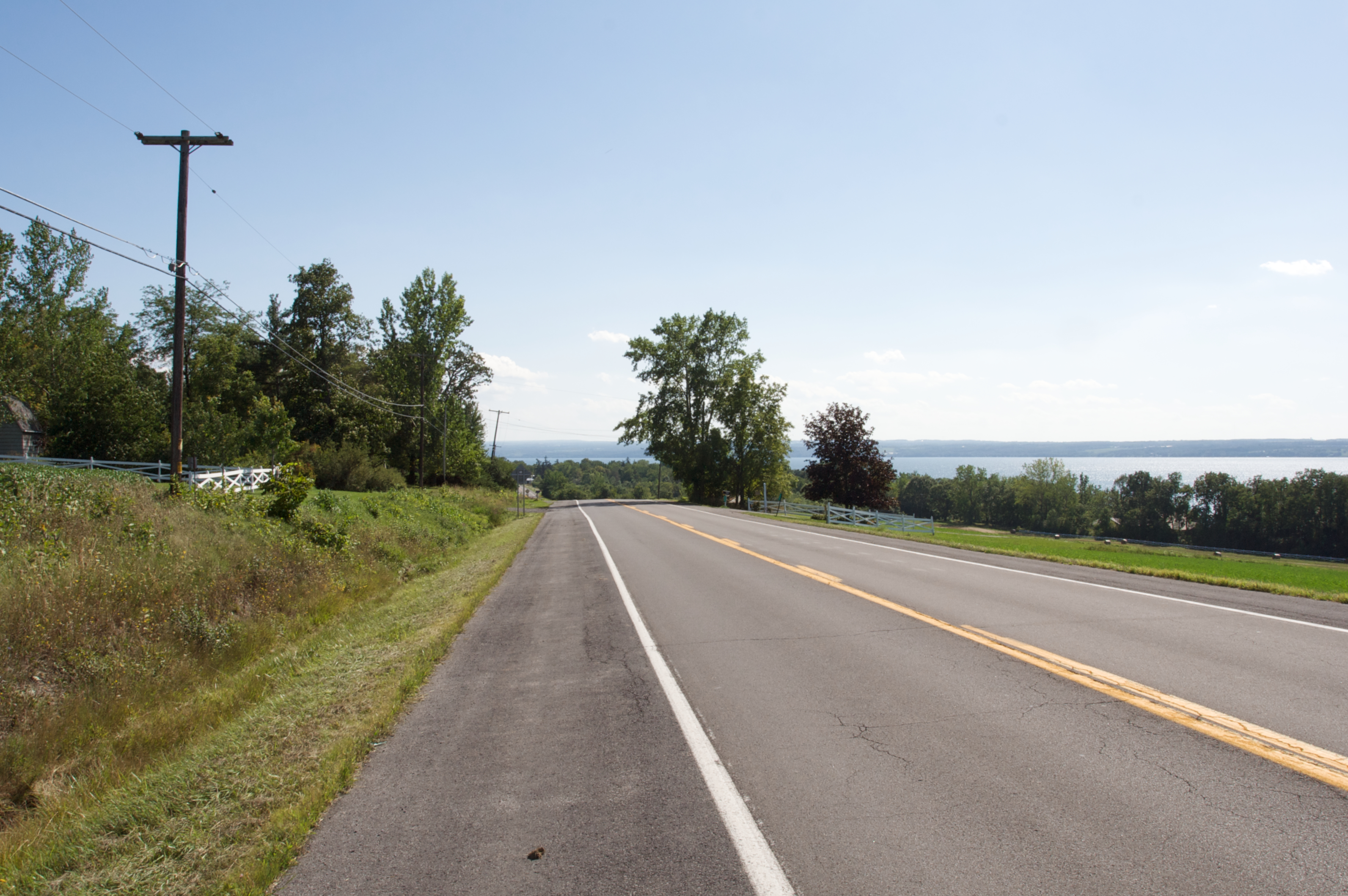
- NY State Route 90, near Union Springs

- Location in Cayuga County and New York

- Location within New York Location within the United States
- Coordinates: 42°51′12″N 76°41′11″W
- Country: United States
- State: New York
- County: Cayuga

Government
  - Type: Town Council
  - Town Supervisor: David Schenck (R)
  - Town Council: Members' List: • Lloyd Cornell (R); • Douglas Bower (); • Andrew Rindfleisch (R); • Richard J. Hodges (R)

Area
  - Total: 26.83 sq mi (69.49 km^{2})
  - Land: 21.41 sq mi (55.45 km^{2})
  - Water: 5.42 sq mi (14.04 km^{2})
- Elevation: 535 ft (163 m)

Population (2010)
  - Total: 2,367
  - Estimate (2016): 2,295
  - Density: 107.2/sq mi (41.39/km^{2})
- Time zone: UTC-5 (Eastern (EST))
  - Summer (DST): UTC-4 (EDT)
- ZIP Codes: 13160 (Union Springs); 13034 (Cayuga); 13021 (Auburn)
- Area code: 315
- FIPS code: 36-011-70376
- GNIS feature ID: 0979515
- Website: springportny.gov

Springport is a town in Cayuga County, New York, United States. The population was 2,367 at the 2010 census. The name is derived from the local springs and lakeports. Springport is on the western border of the county and is southwest of Auburn.

== History ==
The town lies in the former territory of the Cayuga tribe. A mission to the tribe by the Jesuits was established in 1688. The Sullivan Expedition destroyed the Cayuga villages in 1779.

The town was excluded from the Central New York Military Tract and set apart as a reservation for the Cayugas who returned after the American Revolution. In 1789, they gave up this land to New York, thus opening it to settlers. The first settlers were occasionally asked to leave due to disputes with the tribal members, but eventually the population of outsiders grew. By 1799, most of the Cayuga, including a few Tuscarora, had sold out and departed the area.

The town of Springport was formed in 1823 from parts of the towns of Scipio and Aurelius. The presence of mineral springs and gypsum proved important in the early economy of Springport.

The village of Union Springs was incorporated in 1848.

== Geography ==
According to the United States Census Bureau, Springport has a total area of 26.8 square miles (69.5 km^{2}), of which 21.4 square miles (55.4 km^{2}) is land and 5.4 square miles (14.1 km^{2}), or 20.24%, is water.

Cayuga Lake defines the western town line, the border of Seneca County. Great Gully Creek flows into the lake south of Farleys, forming the southern town boundary.

New York State Route 90 runs north-south along Cayuga Lake and intersects New York State Route 326 north of Union Springs.

One of the few Finger Lakes islands, Frontenac Island, is located near Union Springs.

== Demographics ==
Historical population
| Census | Pop. | Note | %± |
|---|---|---|---|
| 1830 | 1,528 | | — |
| 1840 | 1,890 | | 23.7% |
| 1850 | 2,041 | | 8.0% |
| 1860 | 2,129 | | 4.3% |
| 1870 | 2,175 | | 2.2% |
| 1880 | 2,252 | | 3.5% |
| 1890 | 1,991 | | −11.6% |
| 1900 | 1,770 | | −11.1% |
| 1910 | 1,447 | | −18.2% |
| 1920 | 1,146 | | −20.8% |
| 1930 | 1,316 | | 14.8% |
| 1940 | 1,418 | | 7.8% |
| 1950 | 1,534 | | 8.2% |
| 1960 | 1,700 | | 10.8% |
| 1970 | 1,911 | | 12.4% |
| 1980 | 2,210 | | 15.6% |
| 1990 | 2,198 | | −0.5% |
| 2000 | 2,256 | | 2.6% |
| 2010 | 2,367 | | 4.9% |
| 2020 | 2,227 | | −5.9% |
U.S. Decennial Census

As of the census of 2000, there were 2,256 people, 865 households, and 629 families residing in the town. The population density was 104.8 inhabitants per square mile (40.5/km^{2}). There were 1,157 housing units at an average density of 53.7 per square mile (20.7/km^{2}). The racial makeup of the town was 97.87% White, 0.75% African American, 0.13% Native American, 0.27% Asian, 0.22% from other races, and 0.75% from two or more races. Hispanic or Latino of any race were 0.71% of the population.

There were 865 households, out of which 33.8% had children under the age of 18 living with them, 59.9% were married couples living together, 8.2% had a female householder with no husband present, and 27.2% were non-families. 22.1% of all households were made up of individuals, and 9.7% had someone living alone who was 65 years of age or older. The average household size was 2.61 and the average family size was 3.04.

In the town, the population was spread out, with 26.4% under the age of 18, 6.2% from 18 to 24, 28.1% from 25 to 44, 24.8% from 45 to 64, and 14.6% who were 65 years of age or older. The median age was 39 years. For every 100 females, there were 95.8 males. For every 100 females age 18 and over, there were 97.5 males.

The median income for a household in the town was $44,792, and the median income for a family was $51,842. Males had a median income of $32,266 versus $26,051 for females. The per capita income for the town was $20,370. About 6.3% of families and 8.6% of the population were below the poverty line, including 13.0% of those under age 18 and 9.5% of those age 65 or over.

== Communities and locations in Springport ==
- Cayuga Junction – A hamlet north of Union Springs by Cayuga Lake.
- Crossroads – A hamlet north of Union Springs.
- Farleys – A hamlet south of Union Springs by Cayuga Lake.
- Farley Point – A projection into Cayuga Lake by Farleys.
- Frontenac Island – A small island in Cayuga Lake near Union Springs. The island was of great ceremonial importance to the Cayuga. It is now part of the Union Springs village.
- Gwau-gwah A former principal Cayuga village once located north of Union Springs.
- Howland Point – A projection into Cayuga Lake north of Union Springs.
- Oakwood – A hamlet in the northeastern part of Springport on NY-326.
- Powers Corner – A hamlet northeast of Union Springs on NY-326.
- Union Springs – The village of Union Springs is located near the center of the town, on NY-90 and the shore of Cayuga Lake.
