= Locke, New York =

- Town
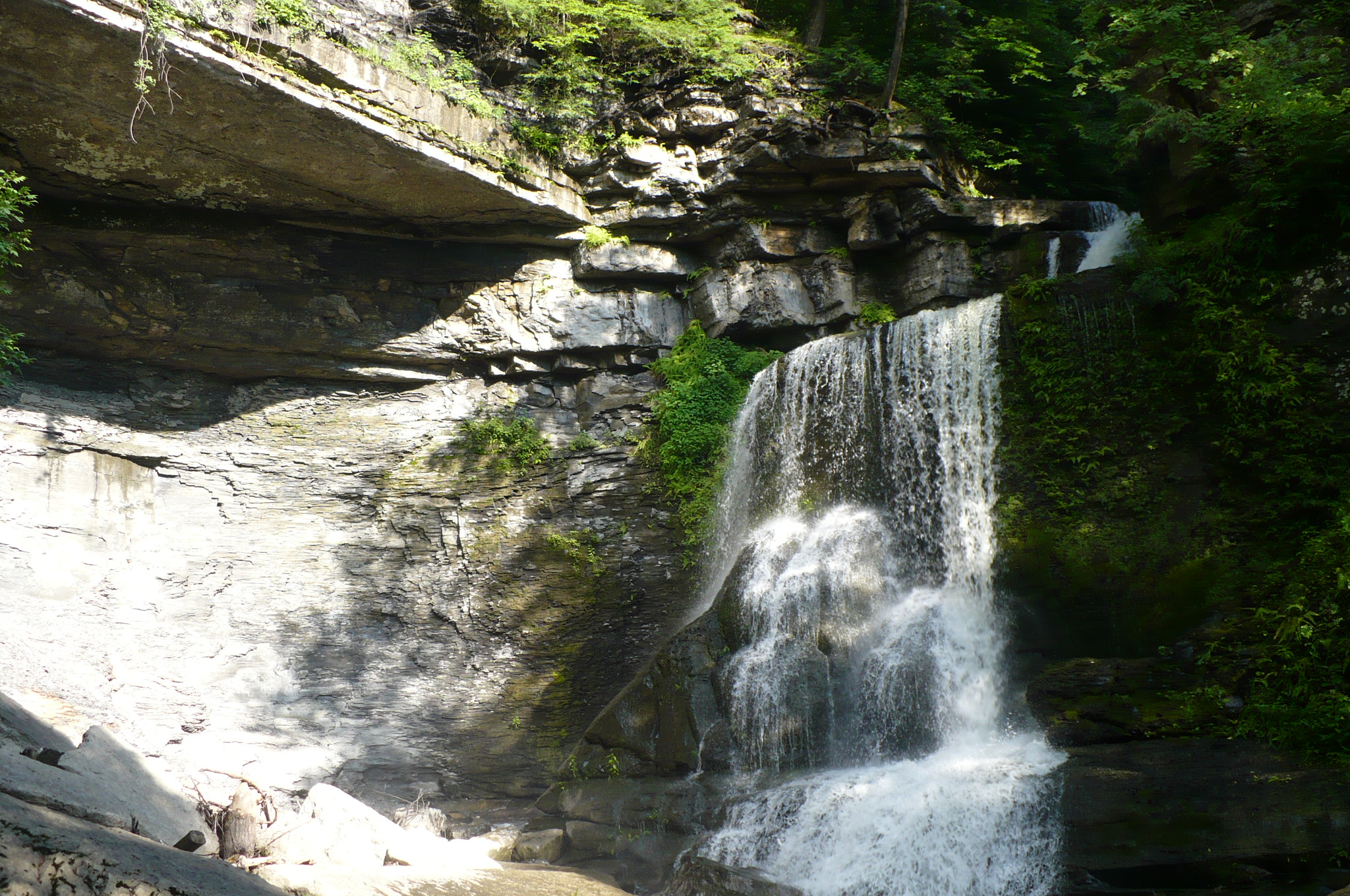
- Fillmore Glen State Park

- Location within New York Location within the United States
- Coordinates: 42°38′57″N 76°25′21″W
- Country: United States
- State: New York
- County: Cayuga

Government
  - Type: Town Council
  - Town Supervisor: John D. Pierce (R)
  - Town Council: Members' List: • Anita Sharpsteen Vogel (R); • Patricia Dillon (R); • Jack Corcoran (D); • Betty E. DeLuna (R)

Area
  - Total: 24.41 sq mi (63.22 km^{2})
  - Land: 24.31 sq mi (62.95 km^{2})
  - Water: 0.10 sq mi (0.27 km^{2})
- Elevation: 1,020 ft (311 m)

Population (2020)
  - Total: 1,877 ▼
  - Estimate (2021): 1,888
  - Density: 77.9/sq mi (30.06/km^{2})
- Time zone: UTC-5 (Eastern (EST))
  - Summer (DST): UTC-4 (EDT)
- ZIP Codes: 13092 (Locke); 13118 (Moravia); 13073 (Groton)
- FIPS code: 36-011-43071
- GNIS feature ID: 0979163
- Website: Town website

Locke is a town in Cayuga County, New York, United States. The population was 1,877 at the 2020 census. The town was named after John Locke, an English philosopher, and is the birthplace of Millard Fillmore, 13th President of the United States.

Locke is on the southern border of Cayuga County and is southeast of Auburn.

== History ==
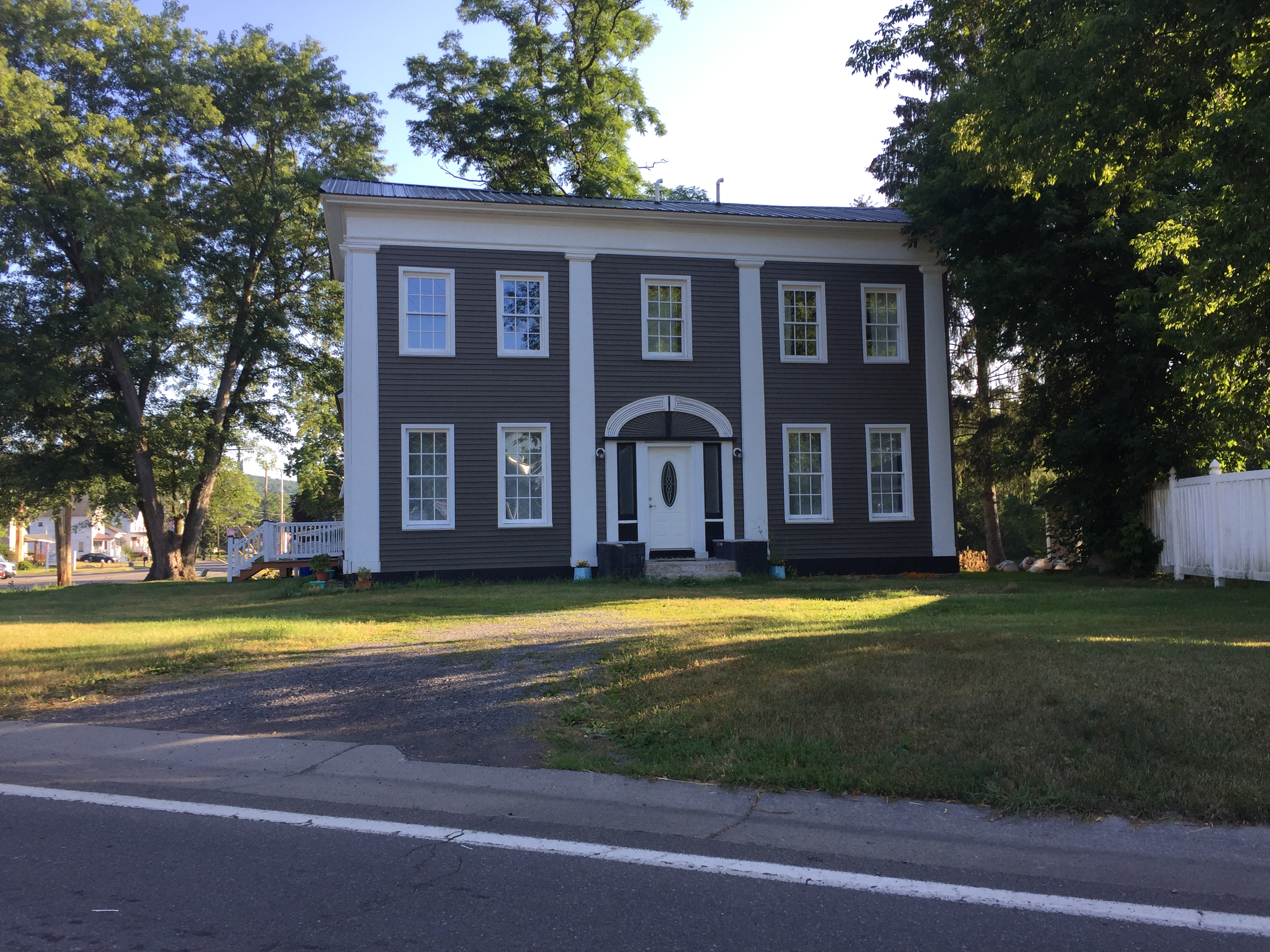
Historic house with pilasters in hamlet of Locke

Locke was in the Central New York Military Tract, used to pay soldiers of the American Revolution. The first settlers arrived in 1790. They found evidence of earlier Native American occupants in the form of ruined villages and burial grounds.

The town of Locke was formed in 1802 from the town of Genoa, then known as "Milton". Part of Locke was used in 1817 to form the town of Groton (now in Tompkins County). Another division of Locke in 1831 formed the town of Summerhill.

A devastating fire in 1912 destroyed approximately thirty buildings in Locke village.

A second devastating fire occurred on April 10, 1975, destroying eleven buildings and causing approximately $650,000 in damage. The fire was a result of a gasoline tanker losing its brakes while descending State Route 90 and crashing into the bank at the intersection of State Route 90 and State Route 38.

== Geography ==
According to the United States Census Bureau, the town has a total area of 24.4 square miles (63.2 km^{2}), of which 24.3 square miles (63.0 km^{2}) is land and 0.12 square miles (0.3 km^{2}), or 0.43%, is water.

North-south New York State Route 38 intersects east-west New York State Route 90 in Locke village.

The Owasco Inlet is a stream flowing northward through the town into Owasco Lake. Hemlock Creek joins the Owasco Inlet at Locke village. The town is in the Finger Lakes region of New York.

== Demographics ==
Historical population
Census	Pop.	Note	%±
1820	2,559		—
1830	3,310		29.3%
1840	1,654		−50.0%
1850	1,478		−10.6%
1860	1,325		−10.4%
1870	1,077		−18.7%
1880	1,141		5.9%
1890	1,001		−12.3%
1900	1,079		7.8%
1910	864		−19.9%
1920	770		−10.9%
1930	714		−7.3%
1940	748		4.8%
1950	811		8.4%
1960	982		21.1%
1970	1,152		17.3%
1980	1,751		52.0%
1990	1,917		9.5%
2000	1,900		−0.9%
2010	1,951		2.7%
2020	1,877		−3.8%
2021 (est.)	1,888		0.6%
U.S. Decennial Census

As of the census of 2000, there were 1,900 people, 704 households, and 539 families residing in the town. The population density was 77.9 inhabitants per square mile (30.1/km^{2}). There were 760 housing units at an average density of 31.1 per square mile (12.0/km^{2}). The racial makeup of the town was 98.26% White, 0.26% African American, 0.42% Native American, 0.42% Asian, and 0.63% from two or more races. 0.42% of the population were Hispanic or Latino of any race.

There were 704 households, out of which 39.3% had children under the age of 18 living with them, 58.8% were married couples living together, 10.1% had a female householder with no husband present, and 23.3% were non-families. 17.6% of all households were made up of individuals, and 6.1% had someone living alone who was 65 years of age or older. The average household size was 2.70 and the average family size was 3.00.

In the town, the population was spread out, with 28.2% under the age of 18, 8.4% from 18 to 24, 29.0% from 25 to 44, 24.5% from 45 to 64, and 9.9% who were 65 years of age or older. The median age was 36 years. For every 100 females, there were 100.0 males. For every 100 females age 18 and over, there were 100.6 males.

The median income for a household in the town was $37,885, and the median income for a family was $41,250. Males had a median income of $28,793 versus $22,188 for females. The per capita income for the town was $16,580. 8.9% of the population and 7.0% of families were below the poverty line. Out of the total population, 10.8% of those under the age of 18 and 2.2% of those 65 and older were living below the poverty line.

== Communities and locations in Locke ==
- Centerville – A historic location north of Locke village.
- Chipman Corners – A hamlet in the southeast of the town on County Road 161 (Chipman Corners Road).
- Fillmore Glen State Park – A state park partly in Locke at the northern town line.
- Grisamore Farms – A popular location for fresh apples, blueberries, raspberries, strawberries, peaches, pumpkins, edible and ornamental plants.
- Locke (formerly "Milan") – A hamlet near the center of the town at the junction of NY-38 and NY-90 and the confluence of Owasco Inlet and Hemlock Creek.
- Satterly Corners – A location north of Shaw Corners on County Road 54 (Toll Gate Road).
- Shaw Corners – A location east of Locke village on NY-90.
- Toll Gate Corners – A hamlet at the northern town line near the state park.
