= New York State Route 326 =

State highway in Cayuga County, New York, US

New York State Route 326
- NY 326 highlighted in red and NY 931E in blue

Route information
- Maintained by NYSDOT
- Length: 8.74 mi (14.07 km)
- Existed: 1930–present

Major junctions
- West end: NY 90 in Union Springs
- East end: US 20 / NY 5 near Auburn

Location
- Country: United States
- State: New York
- Counties: Cayuga

Highway system
- New York Highways; Interstate; US; State; Reference; Parkways
← NY 325	→ NY 327

New York State Route 326 (NY 326) is a 8.74-mile-long (14.07 km) state highway in Cayuga County, New York, in the United States. NY 326 runs in a southwest to northeast direction from the village of Union Springs to the city of Auburn. The western terminus of the route is at an intersection with NY 90 near the northern village line of Union Springs. Its eastern terminus is at a junction with U.S. Route 20 (US 20) and NY 5 just west of the Auburn city limits in the town of Aurelius. NY 326 passes through largely rural portions of the Finger Lakes region and does not pass through any built-up areas other than those at each of its termini.

NY 326 was assigned as part of the 1930 renumbering of state highways in New York as a connector highway between Union Springs and Auburn. However, its original alignment followed Oakwood Road and Genesee Street from the hamlet of Oakwood to downtown Auburn. It was realigned in the mid-1970s to end at US 20 and NY 5 west of downtown Auburn. In 1981, NY 326 was rerouted between the hamlets of Oakwood and Half Acre to follow Half Acre Road. NY 326's former routing between the two points is now maintained by Cayuga County.

== Route description ==
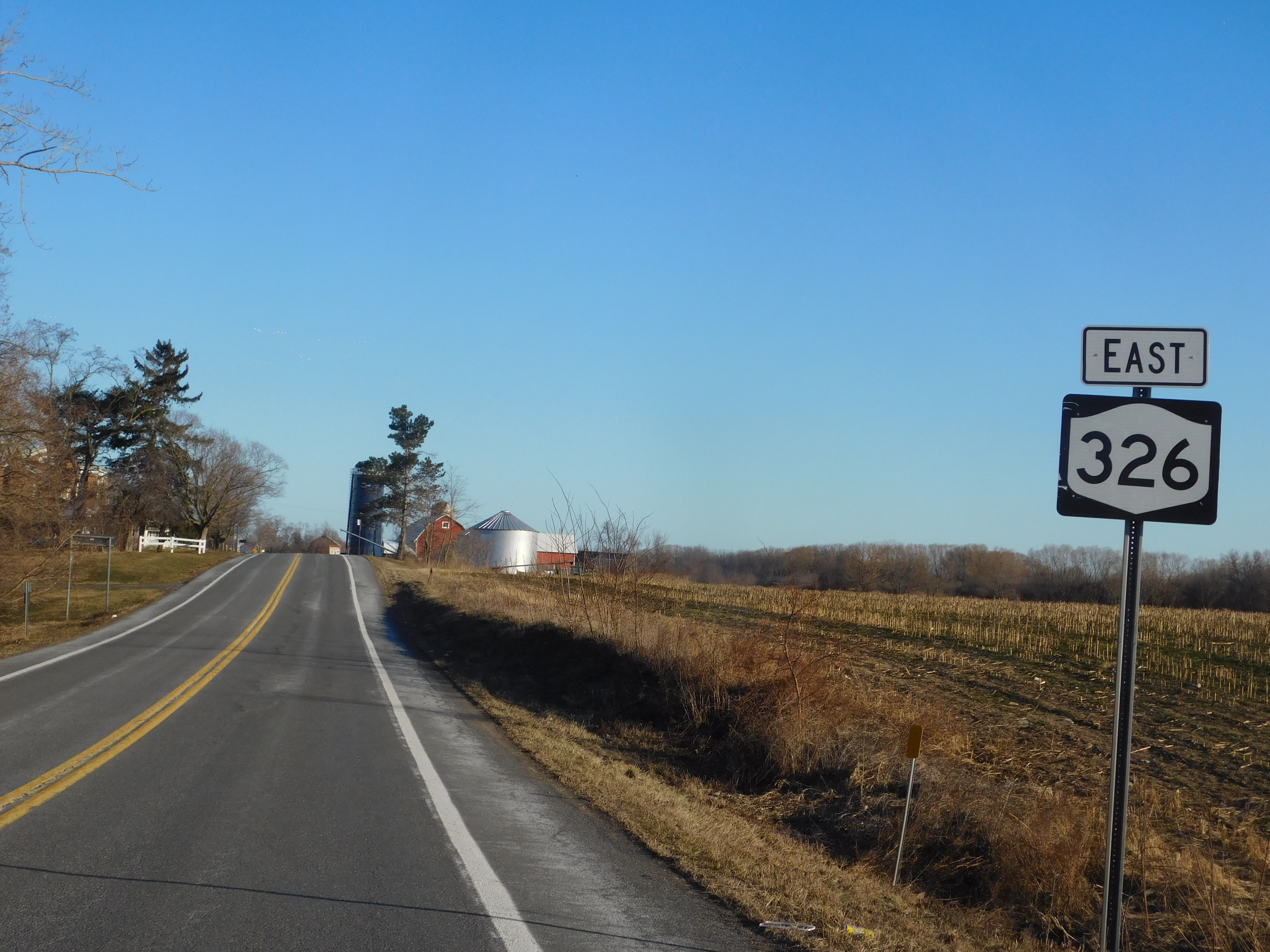
NY 326 east of Union Springs

NY 326 begins at an intersection with NY 90 near the northern village line of Union Springs. The highway heads eastward, following Auburn Street as it runs along the northern village boundary. It briefly parallels a former alignment of itself, now known as "Old Route 326", before exiting Union Springs and entering the surrounding town of Springport. Much of Springport, a town situated on the eastern shore of Cayuga Lake, is rural and largely undeveloped. The route passes by houses and fields as it proceeds to a junction known locally as "Powers Corner". Here, NY 326 turns northeastward and becomes known only by its designation as it heads toward the hamlet of Oakwood.

In Oakwood, NY 326 passes several homes and intersects Oakwood Road, a north–south highway linking the community to West Genesee Street in the town of Aurelius to the north. At this junction, NY 326 becomes Half Acre Road, named for the hamlet of Half Acre to the northeast. The highway continues its northeastern track for 1.5 miles (2.4 km) before turning to the north and entering Half Acre, a small community in Aurelius that is built up around the junction of Half Acre Road and West Genesee Street. Here, NY 326 turns eastward to follow West Genesee Road toward the city of Auburn. It parallels US 20 and NY 5 for 1.5 miles (2.4 km) to the Veterans Memorial Parkway, which NY 326 turns northward onto. It briefly enters the Auburn city limits but ends at an intersection with US 20 and NY 5 just west of the Auburn city limits in Aurelius.

== History ==
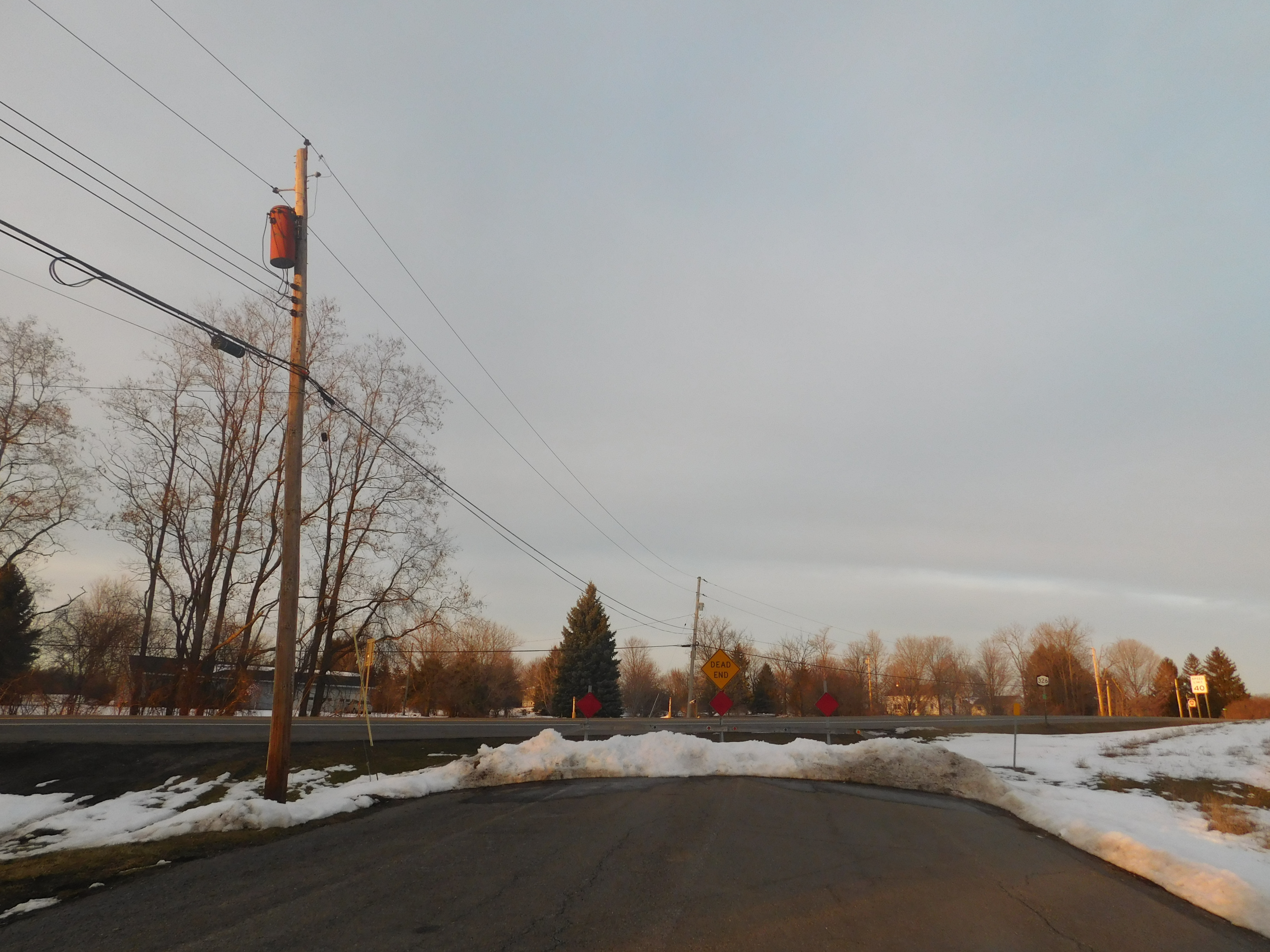
NY 326's former alignment at its current one in Union Springs

NY 326 was assigned as part of the 1930 renumbering of state highways in New York and extended from the village of Union Springs to the city of Auburn. The route initially followed Oakwood Road and Genesee Street from the hamlet of Oakwood to Auburn, where it ended at an intersection with NY 34 (South Street) in downtown Auburn. A divided highway was built west of Auburn c. 1975, connecting the overlapping routes of US 20 and NY 5 to NY 326. US 20 and NY 5 were rerouted to follow the new highway south to NY 326, and all three routes continued east into downtown on Genesee Street. By 1977, US 20 and NY 5 were realigned once again to follow a new arterial leading from the north end of the divided highway eastward into downtown. NY 326, meanwhile, was realigned to follow the divided highway north to US 20 and NY 5.

On April 1, 1981, NY 326 was realigned between the hamlets of Oakwood and Half Acre as the result of a highway maintenance swap between the state of New York and Cayuga County. As part of the swap, the state of New York assumed maintenance of Half Acre Road from Oakwood to Half Acre while maintenance of NY 326's former routing between the two locations was transferred to Cayuga County. The former routing of NY 326 on Oakwood Road is now designated as County Route 168A (CR 168A) in the town of Aurelius and CR 168B in the town of Springport. The Genesee Street portion of old NY 326 is now part of CR 1. In the 1981 maintenance swap, the state of New York also assumed maintenance of the section of Half Acre Road between Half Acre (at NY 326) and the US 20 / NY 5 concurrency. This portion of Half Acre Road is now NY 931E, an unsigned reference route.

== Major intersections ==
The entire route is in Cayuga County.

Location	mi	km	Destinations	Notes
Springport	0.00	0.00	NY 90 (North Cayuga Street) – Union Springs, Cayuga	Western terminus
Aurelius	6.38	10.27	Half Acre Road (NY 931E)	Southern terminus of unsigned NY 931E; hamlet of Half Acre
Auburn	8.02	12.91	Genesee Street	Former routing of US 20, NY 5 and NY 326
Aurelius	8.74	14.07	US 20 / NY 5 (Arterial East) – Seneca Falls, Geneva, Auburn	Eastern terminus
1.000 mi = 1.609 km; 1.000 km = 0.621 mi

== See also ==
- List of county routes in Cayuga County, New York
