= Thomas Madison (settler) =

Thomas Madison was an American Revolutionary War veteran from Ashtabula County, Ohio, who became the first settler of the city of Genoa, Illinois, United States.

As early as 1835, Madison settled in north-eastern Illinois and named the settlement Genoa after a town of the same name in New York. Some historians have the date of settlement as 1836 and mention that Madison settled with his immediate family, including his son-in-law Voranus Emory Moore. Madison served as the town's first postmaster and storekeeper, and entries of sales from his store have been found from as early as May 12, 1843.

Madison built a log cabin on the spot where a hotel was kept by H. N. Perkins and Luke Nichols until the 1860s. In the autumn of 1837, Madison moved to Texas and sold his property to Perkins and a group of three other settlers for the sum of $2800.
