= Aurelius, New York =

- Town
- Location in Cayuga County and the state of New York
- Coordinates: 42°56′N 76°40′W
- Country: United States
- State: New York
- County: Cayuga

Government
  - Type: Town Council
  - Town Supervisor: Edward J. Ide, Jr. (R)

Area
  - Total: 32.00 sq mi (82.87 km^{2})
  - Land: 30.24 sq mi (78.33 km^{2})
  - Water: 1.75 sq mi (4.53 km^{2})
- Elevation: 512 ft (156 m)

Population (2020)
  - Total: 2,610 ▼
  - Estimate (2021): 2,595
  - Density: 89/sq mi (34.4/km^{2})
- Time zone: UTC-5 (Eastern (EST))
  - Summer (DST): UTC-4 (EDT)
- ZIP Codes: 13021 (Auburn); 13034 (Cayuga); 13140 (Port Byron)
- Area code: 315
- FIPS code: 36-011-03166
- GNIS feature ID: 0978697
- Website: aureliustown.org

Aurelius is a town in Cayuga County, New York, United States. The population was 2,610 at the 2020 census. The town was named after the Roman emperor Marcus Aurelius. It is at the western edge of the county and borders the city of Auburn.

== History ==
The Sullivan Expedition passed through to destroy the Cayuga villages in 1779. This region became part of the Central New York Military Tract, used to compensate New York soldiers for service in the military during the War for Independence. The first European-American settler of record arrived in the area in 1789. It is likely that others had made their homes in the vicinity on lands belonging to the native Iroquois. The town of Aurelius, formed in 1789, was already an existing township when Cayuga County was carved out of Onondaga County in 1799. The town of Auburn was established from a portion of Aurelius. (Auburn was incorporated as a village in 1815 and received a city charter in 1848; the west line of the city abuts the town of Aurelius.)

Among the most prominent of the native sons of Aurelius were inventor Birdsill Holley and Miriam Angeline Works, first wife of Brigham Young, who led the "Latter-Day Saints" into the Great Salt Lake Valley in 1847.

== Geography ==
According to the United States Census Bureau, the town of Aurelius has a total area of 32.0 square miles (82.9 km^{2}), of which 30.2 square miles (78.3 km^{2}) is land and 1.7 square miles (4.5 km^{2}), or 5.47%, is water.

The western town line is defined by Cayuga Lake, one of the larger Finger Lakes. The town is bordered to the east by the city of Auburn. To the north are the towns of Montezuma and Throop, and to the south are the towns of Springport and Fleming.

Conjoined US 20 and NY 5 is a major east–west highway. New York State Route 90 is a north–south highway along the shore of Cayuga Lake. New York State Route 326 passes across the southeastern part of the town.

== Demographics ==
Historical population
Census	Pop.	Note	%±
1820	7,923		—
1830	2,768		−65.1%
1840	2,645		−4.4%
1850	2,831		7.0%
1860	2,528		−10.7%
1870	1,952		−22.8%
1880	1,954		0.1%
1890	1,793		−8.2%
1900	1,563		−12.8%
1910	1,437		−8.1%
1920	1,277		−11.1%
1930	1,430		12.0%
1940	1,342		−6.2%
1950	2,039		51.9%
1960	2,600		27.5%
1970	2,851		9.7%
1980	2,920		2.4%
1990	2,913		−0.2%
2000	2,931		0.6%
2010	2,792		−4.7%
2020	2,610		−6.5%
2021 (est.)	2,595		−0.6%
U.S. Decennial Census

As of the census of 2000, there were 2,936 people, 1,124 households, and 816 families residing in the town. The population density was 97.0 inhabitants per square mile (37.5/km^{2}). There were 1,281 housing units at an average density of 42.3 per square mile (16.3/km^{2}). The racial makeup of the town was 98.60% White, 0.34% African American, 0.14% Native American, 0.03% Asian, 0.07% from other races, and 0.82% from two or more races. Hispanic or Latino of any race were 1.19% of the population.

There were 1,124 households, out of which 31.6% had children under the age of 18 living with them, 59.8% were married couples living together, 8.5% had a female householder with no husband present, and 27.4% were non-families. 22.9% of all households were made up of individuals, and 11.7% had someone living alone who was 65 years of age or older. The average household size was 2.59 and the average family size was 3.05.

In the town, the population was spread out, with 25.6% under the age of 18, 6.2% from 18 to 24, 27.1% from 25 to 44, 24.4% from 45 to 64, and 16.7% who were 65 years of age or older. The median age was 40 years. For every 100 females, there were 98.2 males. For every 100 females age 18 and over, there were 98.0 males.

The median income for a household in the town was $41,202, and the median income for a family was $48,188. Males had a median income of $34,125 versus $22,895 for females. The per capita income for the town was $19,323. About 7.4% of families and 8.3% of the population were below the poverty line, including 10.0% of those under age 18 and 4.7% of those age 65 or over.

== Notable people ==
- William A. Sackett, congressman
- Feramorz Little, 4th mayor of Salt Lake City, Utah

== Communities and locations in Aurelius ==
- Cayuga – The village of Cayuga is on the shore of Cayuga Lake and NY-90.
- Half Acre – A hamlet east of Aurelius and west of Auburn on NY-326 known at one time as Hell's Half Acre. It is centralized just west of the Cayuga-Onondaga BOCES Center.
- Mud Lock – A dam and canal lock on the Cayuga–Seneca Canal at the northern end of Cayuga Lake, maintaining the lake level of Cayuga Lake, in the northwestern part of the town on NY-90. The Cayuga-Seneca Canal system connects the two Finger Lakes to the Erie Canal.
- Relius – A hamlet west of Auburn and east of Cayuga; location of the Town Hall, Court, and Highway Dept; formerly a railroad stop on what is now the Finger Lakes Railway.

There are also several defunct hamlets listed in Aurelius in the official New York State Gazetteer, which is maintained and published by the New York State Department of Health, including Almhurst, Fosterville, East Ashford, and Riceville.
