= Owasco River =

- Location of the mouth within New York Owasco River (the United States)

Location
- Country: United States
- State: New York

Physical characteristics
- Source: Owasco Lake
  - location: Auburn
  - coordinates: 42°54′11″N 76°32′34″W
- Mouth: Seneca River
  - location: North-northwest of Port Byron
  - coordinates: 43°04′36″N 76°38′54″W
- Length: 22.5 km (14.0 mi)
- Basin size: 220 sq mi (570 km^{2})

Owasco River (also known as Owasco Creek, Owasco Lake Outlet, and Owasco Outlet) is a river in Cayuga County in the state of New York. The river drains Owasco Lake at Auburn and flows in a north-northwest direction before converging with the Seneca River north-northwest of Port Byron. The Owasco River Railway is named after the river.

The city of Auburn owns and operates a dam on the river, and empties the effluent from its wastewater treatment plant into the river.

== Hydrology ==
The United States Geological Survey (USGS) maintains one stream gauge along the Owasco River. It has been operation since October 1998, and is located about 200 feet (61 m) upstream from Genesee Street in Auburn.

The station had a maximum discharge of 2,730 cubic feet (77 m^{3}) per second and a gauge height of 8.34 feet (2.54 m) on April 4, 2005. It had minimum discharge of 1.6 cubic feet (0.045 m^{3}) per second on March 30-31, 1999, and July 22, 1999.
