= Port Byron, New York =

- Village
- Location within the state of New York
- Coordinates: 43°2′N 76°38′W
- Country: United States
- State: New York
- County: Cayuga
- Town: Mentz

Area
  - Total: 0.94 sq mi (2.43 km^{2})
  - Land: 0.91 sq mi (2.36 km^{2})
  - Water: 0.027 sq mi (0.07 km^{2})
- Elevation: 407 ft (124 m)

Population (2020)
  - Total: 1,101
  - Density: 1,207.4/sq mi (466.17/km^{2})
- Time zone: UTC-5 (Eastern (EST))
  - Summer (DST): UTC-4 (EDT)
- ZIP code: 13140
- Area code: 315
- FIPS code: 36-59212
- GNIS feature ID: 0960960
- Website: portbyronvillage.org

Port Byron is a village in Cayuga County, New York, United States. As of the 2020 census, Port Byron had a population of 1,101. It is in the town of Mentz and is north of Auburn.

== History ==
Settlers began arriving around 1797. Originally known as "King's Settlement", then Bucksville, finally, the name was changed to Port Byron in 1825 as it became a port on the Erie Canal. It has been suggested that the new name may have been chosen in reference to Lord Byron, the English romantic poet who had died the previous year, however there is no definitive proof of this. Later, when the canal route was changed in 1856, the village was a railroad town. The village was incorporated in 1837.

The Erie Canal Lock 52 Complex was listed on the National Register of Historic Places in 1998. The New York Central Railroad named a Sleeper car after the town.

== Notable people ==
There are a number of people who can trace their roots back to Port Byron or who settled here for a while. Before he was a leader of the Mormon faith, Brigham Young lived here in the early 1830s. He was a painter and builder. One of the early buildings he lived in still exists on Pine Street. Henry Wells of "Wells and Fargo" fame also lived here in the early 1830s. We can trace Isaac Singer of sewing machine fame here in 1837, when he was better known for his acting than his machinery skills. Sculptor Byron Pickett lived here in the 1840s, and his family is buried in the local cemetery. Clara Barrus trained in Boston to become a doctor. She is better known as the aid and biographer of naturalist John Burroughs. She also wrote a book about her childhood, titled A Life Unveiled, written under the name "A Child of the Drumlins". Opera singer Richard Bonelli was born here as Jacob Bunn. Physicist Dr. Francis Eugene Nipher, a professor at Washington University in St. Louis, is well known for his early work on the effect of electrical charges on attractive and repulsive forces. Mel Hall played baseball at Port Byron prior to his MLB career; he was drafted in the 1978 draft by the Cubs. Edward G. Delaney, an aerospace scientist and mechanical engineer who worked on the iconic Mercury, Gemini, and Apollo space programs is a Port Byron High School Hall of Fame member and 1948 graduate. Mark Jindrak also graduated from the high school.

== Geography ==
Port Byron is located at 43°2′N 76°38′W (43.0368, -76.6254). According to the United States Census Bureau, the village has a total area of 1.01 square miles (2.61 km^{2}), of which 0.98 square miles (2.54 km^{2}) is land and 0.031 square miles (0.08 km^{2}), or 2.91%, is water.

The village is at the junction of Routes 31 and 38. The New York State Thruway passes through the northwest corner of the village but with no direct access. The Owasco Outlet flows northward from Owasco Lake to the Seneca River through the village. It provided substantial water power to the early village.

== Demographics ==
Historical population
Census	Pop.	Note	%±
1870	1,089		—
1880	1,146		5.2%
1890	1,105		−3.6%
1900	1,013		−8.3%
1910	1,085		7.1%
1920	1,035		−4.6%
1930	890		−14.0%
1940	961		8.0%
1950	1,013		5.4%
1960	1,201		18.6%
1970	1,330		10.7%
1980	1,400		5.3%
1990	1,359		−2.9%
2000	1,297		−4.6%
2010	1,290		−0.5%
2020	1,101		−14.7%
U.S. Decennial Census

As of the census of 2000, there were 1,297 people, 501 households, and 350 families residing in the village. The population density was 1,287.7 inhabitants per square mile (497.2/km^{2}). There were 527 housing units at an average density of 523.2 per square mile (202.0/km^{2}). The racial makeup of the village was 95.22% White, 1.54% African American, 0.39% Native American, 0.15% Asian, 1.23% from other races, and 1.46% from two or more races. Hispanic or Latino of any race were 2.16% of the population.

There were 501 households, out of which 32.1% had children under the age of 18 living with them, 47.9% were married couples living together, 16.2% had a female householder with no husband present, and 30.1% were non-families. 23.4% of all households were made up of individuals, and 10.6% had someone living alone who was 65 years of age or older. The average household size was 2.57 and the average family size was 2.98.

In the village, the population was spread out, with 26.0% under the age of 18, 7.8% from 18 to 24, 28.9% from 25 to 44, 21.5% from 45 to 64, and 15.8% who were 65 years of age or older. The median age was 38 years. For every 100 females, there were 93.0 males. For every 100 females age 18 and over, there were 91.2 males.

The median income for a household in the village was $35,625, and the median income for a family was $37,054. Males had a median income of $30,875 versus $20,404 for females. The per capita income for the village was $15,741. About 11.0% of families and 12.9% of the population were below the poverty line, including 13.3% of those under age 18 and 12.9% of those age 65 or over.

== Education ==
It is in the Port Byron Central School District.
