= Genoa, New York =

- Town
- Location within Cayuga County and the state of New York

- Location within New York Location within the United States
- Coordinates: 42°40′N 76°32′W
- Country: United States
- State: New York
- County: Cayuga

Government
  - Type: Town Council
  - Town Supervisor: Donald Slocum (R)
  - Town Council: Members' List: • Lorie S. Fessenden (R); • Cheryl M. Shields (R); • Richard D. Sellen (R); • Michael B. Piechuta (R)

Area
  - Total: 43.16 sq mi (111.79 km^{2})
  - Land: 39.60 sq mi (102.56 km^{2})
  - Water: 3.56 sq mi (9.23 km^{2})
- Elevation: 1,030 ft (314 m)

Population (2020)
  - Total: 1,816 ▼
  - Estimate (2021): 1,815
  - Density: 48.1/sq mi (18.58/km^{2})
- Time zone: UTC-5 (Eastern (EST))
  - Summer (DST): UTC-4 (EDT)
- ZIP Codes: 13071 (Genoa); 13081 (King Ferry); 13092 (Locke)
- Area code: 315
- FIPS code: 36-011-28673
- GNIS feature ID: 0978994
- Website: www.townofgenoany.com

Genoa is a town in Cayuga County, New York, United States. The population was 1,816 at the 2020 census. The town is named after Genoa in Italy.

The town is located in the southwestern corner of the county and is north of Ithaca. Genoa is in the heart of the Finger Lakes region.

== History ==
The Sullivan Expedition moved through the area in 1779 destroying native villages and stores. Genoa became part of the Central New York Military Tract. The first settlers arrived in 1791.

The town was created as Milton in 1789 while still part of Onondaga County. The name was changed to Genoa in 1808. The name was later adopted for use in Genoa, Illinois by early settler Thomas Madison, a Revolutionary War soldier who was inspired by the town in New York.

The town was reduced to form the town of Locke in 1802. Genoa was reduced again in 1817 to form the town of Lansing in Tompkins County.

== Geography ==
According to the United States Census Bureau, Genoa has a total area of 43.2 square miles (111.8 km^{2}), of which 39.6 square miles (102.6 km^{2}) is land and 3.6 square miles (9.2 km^{2}), or 8.26%, is water.

The western town line, marked by Cayuga Lake, is the border of Seneca County, and the southern town boundary is the border of Tompkins County.

New York State Route 34 and New York State Route 34B are north-south highways through the town. New York State Route 90 becomes an east-west highway at Jump Corners.

== Demographics ==
Historical population
| Census | Pop. | Note | %± |
|---|---|---|---|
| 1800 | 3,353 | | — |
| 1810 | 5,245 | | 56.4% |
| 1820 | 2,585 | | −50.7% |
| 1830 | 2,768 | | 7.1% |
| 1840 | 2,593 | | −6.3% |
| 1850 | 2,503 | | −3.5% |
| 1860 | 2,429 | | −3.0% |
| 1870 | 2,295 | | −5.5% |
| 1880 | 2,517 | | 9.7% |
| 1890 | 2,320 | | −7.8% |
| 1900 | 2,075 | | −10.6% |
| 1910 | 1,866 | | −10.1% |
| 1920 | 1,483 | | −20.5% |
| 1930 | 1,407 | | −5.1% |
| 1940 | 1,425 | | 1.3% |
| 1950 | 1,672 | | 17.3% |
| 1960 | 1,794 | | 7.3% |
| 1970 | 1,744 | | −2.8% |
| 1980 | 1,921 | | 10.1% |
| 1990 | 1,868 | | −2.8% |
| 2000 | 1,914 | | 2.5% |
| 2010 | 1,935 | | 1.1% |
| 2020 | 1,816 | | −6.1% |
| 2021 (est.) | 1,815 | | −0.1% |
U.S. Decennial Census

As of the census of 2000, there were 1,914 people, 718 households, and 529 families residing in the town. The population density was 48.3 inhabitants per square mile (18.6/km^{2}). There were 927 housing units at an average density of 23.4 per square mile (9.0/km^{2}). The racial makeup of the town was 97.02% White, 0.52% African American, 0.31% Native American, 0.16% Asian, 0.10% Pacific Islander, 1.25% from other races, and 0.63% from two or more races. Hispanic or Latino of any race were 2.40% of the population.

There were 718 households, out of which 34.8% had children under the age of 18 living with them, 61.4% were married couples living together, 7.5% had a female householder with no husband present, and 26.3% were non-families. 20.6% of all households were made up of individuals, and 8.5% had someone living alone who was 65 years of age or older. The average household size was 2.67 and the average family size was 3.09.

In the town, the population was spread out, with 28.2% under the age of 18, 6.8% from 18 to 24, 26.8% from 25 to 44, 24.8% from 45 to 64, and 13.5% who were 65 years of age or older. The median age was 38 years. For every 100 females, there were 105.4 males. For every 100 females age 18 and over, there were 100.4 males.

The median income for a household in the town was $43,618, and the median income for a family was $50,473. Males had a median income of $32,679 versus $23,603 for females. The per capita income for the town was $20,960. About 6.1% of families and 8.2% of the population were below the poverty line, including 10.9% of those under age 18 and 6.3% of those age 65 or over.

== Communities and localities ==
- Atwaters – A hamlet in the southwestern corner of Genoa on the shore of Cayuga Lake.
- Belltown – A location east of Goodyear Corners.
- Bowers Corners – A hamlet southeast of King Ferry.
- East Genoa – A hamlet in the southeastern part of the town on NY-34. The East Genoa Methodist Episcopal Church was listed on the National Register of Historic Places in 2002.
- Five Corners – A hamlet in the south of Genoa, east of Goodyear Corners.
- Forks of the Creek – A location southeast of Five Corners.
- Genoa – A hamlet at the junction of NY-34 and NY-90.
- Goodyear Corners – A hamlet south of King Ferry on NY-34B.
- Jump Corners – A location west of King Ferry on NY-90.
- King Ferry (formerly "Northville") – A hamlet in the northwestern part of town at the junction of NY-34B and NY-90.
- King Ferry Station – A hamlet west of King Ferry at the edge of Cayuga Lake.
- Little Hollow – A location on NY-90 between King Ferry and Genoa at Little Salmon Creek.
- Little Salmon Creek – A stream flowing south through the center of the town, leading to Cayuga Lake.
- McQuiggen Corners – A location west of Goodyear Corners.
- Weekes Corners – A location between King Ferry and Little Hollow.

== Notable people ==
- John Bascom (1827–1911), educator, writer, president of the University of Wisconsin
- Asahel Finch, Jr. (1809–1883), politician and lawyer in Michigan and Wisconsin
- Zebina Streeter (1838–1889), renegade known as White Apache who raided with the Apache tribes
