= Owasco Lake =

Lake in New York

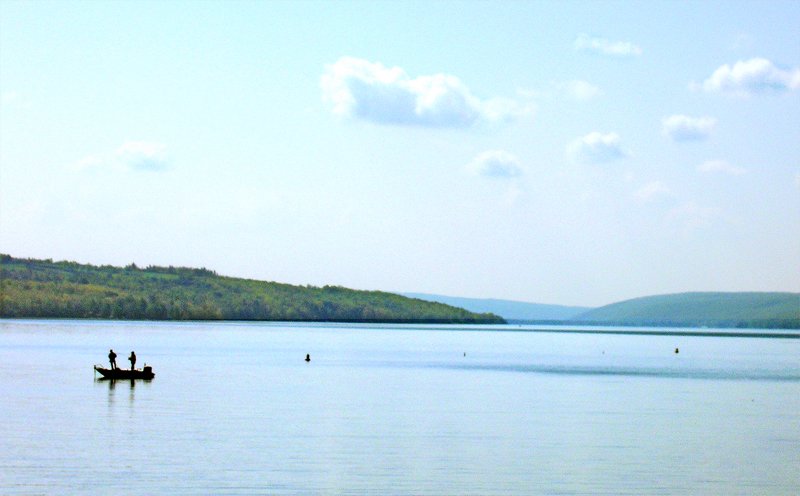
- Owasco Lake, looking south.

- Location within New York Owasco Lake (the United States)
- Location: Cayuga County, New York, United States
- Group: Finger Lakes
- Coordinates: 42°48′54″N 76°30′30″W
- Type: Ground moraine
- Primary inflows: Owasco Inlet
- Primary outflows: Owasco Outlet
- Catchment area: 208 sq mi (540 km^{2})
- Basin countries: United States
- Max. length: 11 mi (18 km)
- Max. width: 1.3 mi (2.1 km)
- Surface area: 6,784 acres (2,745 ha)
- Average depth: 96 ft (29 m)
- Max. depth: 177 ft (54 m)
- Water volume: .193 cu mi (0.80 km^{3})
- Shore length^{1}: 24.7 miles (39.8 km)
- Surface elevation: 712 ft (217 m)
- Islands: 2 (Off of Burtis Point and Deauville Island)
- Settlements: Auburn, New York, Cascade, New York
- ^{1} Shore length is not a well-defined measure.

The eleven Finger Lakes of New York State.

Owasco Lake /oʊˈwɑːskoʊ/ is a Finger Lake in Cayuga County in central New York state, USA. It is the third easternmost and sixth largest of the chain.

== History ==
Owasco Lake's name may have been derived from the Iroquois word dwas-co, meaning bridge on the water. The name may also have been derived from the word was-co, meaning floating bridge. Cayuga territory was found between the territory of the Onondaga and Seneca. Jesuits founded missions among the Cayuga in the mid-17th century. In 1660, there were approximately 1,500 Cayuga.

In the nineteenth century, Owasco Lake was a popular vacation spot for the well-to-do. A casino located just north of Cascade hosted guests traveling by rail along the western length of the lake. It burned down in the early years of the twentieth century, but vestiges of the railway remain in the swampy waters. The "iIndianist" composer Arthur Farwell camped on the east shore in 1899, before assuming his teaching duties at Cornell University, and wrote a set of piano pieces depicting his experience, entitled "Owasco Memories." He included a representation of "The Casino Across the Lake."

== Description ==
Owasco Lake is 11.1 miles (17.9 km) long, with a maximum width of 1.3 miles (2.1 km). The lake reaches a maximum depth of 177 feet (54 m) and has a surface elevation of 712 feet (217 m) above sea level, controlled by a dam on the lake's outlet. The lake has a volume of 212 billion US gallons (800,000,000 m^{3}), and drains a watershed of 208 square miles (540 km^{2}).

The city of Auburn is located at the northern end and takes its drinking water from the lake. The lake lies entirely within the boundaries of Cayuga County, and the watershed boundary includes portions of Onondaga County and Tompkins County. Located at the south end of the lake is the hamlet of Cascade, which consists of a community of cottages, a marina, and a restaurant.

Owasco has the largest catchment area, or watershed, of all the Finger Lakes. This means that the land use has a large impact on water quality, and the lake especially vulnerable to nutrient loading from stormwater run-off. It is also downstream from the villages of Moravia and Groton. Sewage treatment effluent from two communities flows into the lake, which is regulated and permitted by the NYS Department of Environmental Conservation.

The Owasco Lake Watershed Inspection and Protection Division (OLWIPD) enforces the 1984 Owasco Lake Watershed Rules and Regulations and inspects various types of land use to determine compliance. OLWIPD is in the process of updating its rules and regulations, which will provide protections comparable to Skaneateles Lake if passed.

== Recreation ==
Owasco Lake is smaller and shallower than many other Finger Lakes, allowing its waters to warm up much more quickly, and making swimming, water-skiing, and boating popular. Emerson Park is a county park with a beach and boat launch on the lake's north end. The private Owasco Yacht Club, founded in 1889, sits on its northeastern corner.

=== Fishing ===
Fish species present in the lake include lake trout, brown trout, rainbow trout, landlocked salmon, largemouth bass, smallmouth bass, northern pike, yellow perch, bluegill, pumpkinseed sunfish, rock bass, black bullhead, pickerel, and walleye. Access is via a fee-for-use county owned hard surface boat launch in the park.
