= List of New York State Historic Markers in Cayuga County, New York =

This is a complete list of New York State Historic Markers in Cayuga County, New York.

== Listings county-wide ==
	Marker name	Image	Date designated	Location	City or Town	Coords	Marker text
1	Auburn Prison			In Front of Prison west Side of State St.	Auburn, New York		Convicts made Sewing Silk 1841–1846 here was Principal Cash Market in U.S. for Cocoons and Raw Silk
2	Auburn Prison			In Front of Prison west Side of State St.	Auburn, New York		Erection Commenced 1816 First Prisoners 1817 Assisted in Construction First Electrocution in the World 1890
3	Calvary Presbyterian Church			Cor. Capitol and Franklin Sts. in Front of Church	Auburn, New York		Oldest Church Edifice in Auburn. erected 1815-17 at Franklin and North Sts. as First Pres. Church moved here 1869
4	Cayuga County Court House			on Court House Green, Genesee St.	Auburn, New York		Frame building erected on rear of this Lot 1809 present building erected 1836 Reconstructed 1922-24
5	Center House			Now on 2nd story Face So. Side Block Genesee and Market Sts.	Auburn, New York		Early Tavern erected 1805 at Genesee and Market Sts. moved here 1829.
6	Center House			At Intersection Genesee and Market Sts.	Auburn, New York		Tavern 1805. Law Office of Gov. Enos Throop 1st Pres. Church Org. 1810 1st White S.S. 1819 Removed To Fulton St. 1829
7	Barracks			north Side W. Genesee St.	Auburn, New York		During the War of 1812 Barracks were Established in this Locality Troops Passing To and from Niagara Camped Here
8	First Freight Depot			on 2nd story Face Schreck Bros. Store, 16 E. Genesee St.	Auburn, New York		First Freight Depot Auburn and Syracuse R.R. Built by C. W. Pomeroy, 1836 building Used Later as Genesee Opera House
9	First School			west Side of Dunning Ave.	Auburn, New York		First School in Vicinity of Auburn erected before 1796 Originally on Genesee St. and Dunning Ave. moved here 1818
10	First Tavern and Store			on Face Auburn Trust Co. Genesee St. Side	Auburn, New York		on Face Auburn Trust Co. Genesee St. Side
11	Fort Hill			At Entrance Ft. Hill Cemetery So. Side Fort St.	Auburn, New York		Fort Hill of Moundbuilder Origin Later Cayuga Council Seat and Village Fort Wasco Traditional Birthplace
12	Francis Hunter Tavern			No. Side E. Genesee St.	Auburn, New York		Francis Hunter erected Tavern here 1808 under Nearby Elm Councils were held between white settlers and Indians
13	Harriet Tubman Home			east Side south St. at City Line	Auburn, New York		Home of Harriet Tubman the Moses of Her Race Underground Railroad Station in Slavery Days
14	Jehiel Clark House			W. Side Cor. Aurelius Ave. and Clark St.	Auburn, New York		House Built 1802 by Jehiel Clark Who here Founded Clarksville 1795 His Grist, Saw and Carding Mills were Nearby Along Owasco River
15	John Huggins			N. Side W. Genesee St. between Crane Brook and City Limits	Auburn, New York		John Huggins here made First Settlement on Genesee Turnpike between Elbridge and Cayuga Ferry in 1791. His Son Zenas Built this Tavern 1804
16	Military Depot Camp			At Cor. Camp St. and Lake Ave.	Auburn, New York		Military Depot Camp During Civil War
17	North Street Cemetery			In Front of Cemetery North St.	Auburn, New York		North Street Cemetery most of the settlers of Harbenbergh's Corners and Early Inhabitants of Auburn and Buried here Main Cemetery Until 1852
18	Bank of Auburn			on Wall of National Hotel Near Entrance	Auburn, New York		on this Site the Bank of Auburn First Bank in Auburn and Predecessor of Nat. Bank of Auburn was Opened 1817 in Demaree's Tavern
19	Osborne Works			on 2nd story Face Old Osborne Offices N. Side Cor. Genesee and Osborne Sts.	Auburn, New York		Osborne Works David M. Osborne, Cyrus C. Dennis and Chas. Wood makers of Kirby Reaper and other farm machinery. Original factory 1858.
20	Pioneer Roads			Marker Fastened To E.Face of Store N.W. Corner Genesee and north Sts., 2nd	Auburn, New York		Pioneer Roads Old Genesee Road 1791 New Genesee Road 1797 Old Chenango Road 1791 Later Known as Cayuga and Seneca Turnpike 1802
21	Site of Bostwick's Tavern			on E. Face Pearson Block Cor. Genesee and Exchange Sts.	Auburn, New York		Site of Bostwick's Tavern 1803–1868 Rebuilt 1824, Renamed Western Exchange Hotel Lafayette a Guest 1825
22	Site of Willard Tavern			on 2nd story Face Metcalf Bldg., 141 Genesee St.	Auburn, New York		Site of Willard Tavern 1810 rebuilt 1828–1830 as American hotel burned 1879
23	Site of First School House			on W. Side north St. in Front of Holy Trinity High School	Auburn, New York		Site of First School House Established in Auburn 1796 Benjamin Phelps Schoolmaster
24	Site of First Log Dam and Mill			on Face of Gas Station S. Side Genesee at Junc. Market. Site, Stone Mill Re	Auburn, New York		Site of First Log Dam and Mill on Owasco River Built by John L Hardenbergh 1793 Enlarged 1802 present Stone Mill 1824
25	Site of Log Cabin			on Market St. in Front of Fire Department	Auburn, New York		on Market St. in Front of Fire Department
26	Wasco			State St.-Grass Plot between Prison Wall and River	Auburn, New York		The Crossing Place Site of a Cayuga Village occupied by Indians before and after Settlement of Hardenbergh Corners 1793
27	William G. Fargo			on 2nd story Face Schreck Bros. Store, 16 E. Genesee St.	Auburn, New York		Wm. G. Fargo May 20, 1818-Aug. 3, 1881. Organizer of Wells-Fargo Express Company served here as first freight agent.
28	Fort Hill			S.W. Corner Fort and Genesee Sts.	Auburn, New York		S.W. Corner Fort and Genesee Sts.
29	Col. John Harris			on Co. Rd. 1/2 Mil S. Vilg. Cayuga Near Entrance Cowan's Pt. Cottage Settle	Aurelius, New York		First White Settler in Cayuga County Built Log Cabin here 1788 Established Harris Ferry Across Cayuga Lake
30	First Cayuga County Court			In Cayuga Vlge. on Rte 90 east Side, south of Genesee St.	Aurelius, New York		First Cayuga County Court held here 1799 Removed To Aurora 1804 and To Auburn 1809
31	Old Genesee Road			On State Rd. 326, 1 Mile north of Oakwood	Aurelius, New York		Old Genesee Road from Hardenbergh Corners to Harris Ferry crossed here
32	Pioneer Roads			On W. Genesee St. State Rd. at Intersection Co. Rd. and Lvrr	Aurelius, New York		Indian Trail and Earliest Road S.W. To Harris Ferry Genesee Turnpike To Cayuga Bridge Built 1800 | on W. Genesee St. State Rd. at Intersection Co. Rd. and Lvrr
33	Site of Treaty for Purchase Cayuga Reservation			on Co. Rd. 1/2 Mil S. Vilg. Cayuga Near Entrance Cowan's Pt. Cottage Settle	Aurelius, New York		Site of Treaty for Purchase Cayuga Reservation from the Indians Red Jacket and Fish Carrier Spokesman for Cayugas
34	Site of Cayuga Long Bridge			N Cayuga Village on Green at End of Genesee St.	Aurelius, New York	42°55′6.96″N 76°43′46.6″W	Site of Cayuga Long Bridge One Mile Long, 1800–1857 Carried Great Steam of Western Migration Early County Jail Was
35	Sullivan's Campaign			on NYS 5 and 20, 1½ Mile E. of Bridge	Aurelius, New York		Sullivan's Campaign One Mile west Col. Butler Crossed Cayuga Lake and Destroyed Cayuga Village of Tichero
36	Cayuga County			Rte. 5 at Onondaga Co. Line	Brutus, New York		Early Iroquois Country 1768. Part of Montgomery Co. 1784. Part of Herkimer Co. 1791. Part of Onondaga Co. 1794. Cayuga Co. Set Off 1799.
37	Centerport			Centerport	Centerport, Cayuga County, New York		Settled by Benj. Haikes 1805-6. Was Important Village on Old Erie Canal in 1825
38	Town of Brutus			Weedsport	Weedsport, New York		Formed from Aurelius 1802 First Settlement in Town made by Arron Frost 1795; He Built the First Grist Mill
39	Weeds' Basin			Just No. of Hotel, Rte. 34	Brutus, New York		Named after Elihu and Edward Weed Who Constructed a Basin on Old Erie Canal 1821. P.O. Established 1822 Weedsport Inc. Village 1831
40	First Settlement			At Intersection L Mi. N. of Seneca River	Cato, New York		First Settlement in the Town of Cato made by Samson Lawrence
41	Abrams Ferry			Near Bridge Over Seneca River	Cato, New York		From 1805 for Many Years Abrams Who Settled in That Year Maintained a Ferry Until the Toll Bridge was Built
42	Cato Four Corners			Meridian	Meridian, New York		Geo. Loveless and Abel Pasko First settlers in 1804 Jesse Elwell and Abner Hollister Settled in 1805. Called Meridian Since 1849
43	Ceremonial Fire			1/2 Mile south of Meridian, on Weedsport County Highway	Cato, New York		Site of Permanent Village and Perpetual Council Fire of Cayuga Branch of the Iroquois. Lamokas, Senecas Trail To Onondaga for Salt
44	Jakway's Corners			Center of Cato Village	Cato, New York		Village Formerly So Called from Dr. John Jakway Settling 1809, Associate of Ethan Allen. Platt Titus First Settler 1805. |
45	Methodist Episcopal Church			on Brick Church Road	Cato, New York		Organized 1820. Brick edifice built 1828. Remodeled about 1870.
46	Old Mill			west of Center of Cato Village east Side of R.R.	Cato, New York		First Grist Mill in Ira. Built in 1818 by John Hooker, associate of Ethan Allen. Mill was Old Part of present Building
47	The Pepper Mill			In Emerson	Emerson, New York		In Emerson
48	Conquest Center			Conquest Vlge. on Rte. 3F	Conquest, New York		Conquest Vlge. on Rte. 3F
49	Pineville			At Spring Lake	Conquest, New York		Formerly So Called from the Pine Forests Which Covered this Locality, Name Changed in 1874 To Spring Lake
50	Town of Conquest			Conquest Vlge. on Rte. 38	Conquest, New York		Set Off from Cato 1821. First settlers 1800 Fire Geo. Snyder, a Soldier of the Revolution and Israel Wolverton
51	First Baptist Church			on Bluefield Rd. N.W. of Fleming	Fleming, New York		First Baptist Church in Aurelius was erected here 1796 Pastor David Irish First Church in Fleming Second in Cayuga County
52	George Fleming			on Rte. 34B 1/2 Mile S. Mapleton	Fleming, New York		on Rte. 34B 1/2 Mile S. Mapleton
53	Great Iroquois Trail			on 34, 1/4 Mile So. Lvrr at Brick School	Fleming, New York		From Cayuga To Owasco Lakes. Part of the Great Trail from Niagara To Albany During the American Revolution
54	Home of Henry Wyckoff			on Auburn Moravis State Rd. at Wyckoff's. W. Side of Rte 38.	Fleming, New York		Built 1835. Jacob Byers Settled here 1790. Plank Road from here To Moravia Built in 1852
55	Josiah Chatfield			N.W. Corner, Center Village of Fleming	Fleming, New York		First Settler of Fleming Village 1798 erected His Home on this Site
56	Sand Beach Ch.			In Front of Brick Church on W. Owasco L. Road. So. Traffic Circle	Fleming, New York		Reformed Protestant Dutch Church at the Owasco Outlet Organized 1807 First building 1810 present Church 1855
57	First Store			East Genoa on Rte. 34	Genoa, New York		In the Town of Genoa was opened here by Elihu Talladay Prior To 1800
58	Forks of the Creek			east of Five Corners at the Forks	Genoa, New York		Pine Lumber was Sawed here from Construction on Early Farm Hoiuses in this Vicinity
59	Presbyterian Church			In Front of Church in Kings Ferry	Genoa, New York		Organized Aug. 13, 1798 by earliest settlers in region, then known as the Military Tract
60	Site of Log Metting House			Correction of Above Marker, Same Location	Genoa, New York		Built 1802, by Congregational Church of Milton. Organized in 1798. Second Oldest Church in Cayuga County.
61	Site of Old Church			1 Mile east and 1 Mile south of Kings Ferry	Genoa, New York		First Congregational in Town on Milton. Organized 1798. First Log Meeting House Built here in 1802
62	Town of Genoa			In Genoa Village south Side Rte. 90 in Front of Church	Genoa, New York		Organized as Milton 1789. Name Changed To Genoa 1808. John Clark was the First Settler 1791
63	Burial Place			Just west of Cato-Meridian Central School	Ira, New York		Burial Place of the Pioneers of this section, including several Revolutionary veterans 1809–1860
64	Fox's Kiln			3/4 Mile west of Ira	Ira, New York		Ancient Limestone Quarries Opened Up Prior To 1835
65	Ira Corners			Stands on Town Line Near Lvrr	Ira, New York		Settled in 1805 by Thomas Barnes, Luther Samuel and Israel Phelps. Two latter opened 1st store 1813. Phelps Built Hotel 1820, Where First Town Meeting was Held, 1821.
66	Town of Ira			In Center of Village	Ira, New York		Set Off from Cato 1821. First settlements in Town, 1800, by David and Eleazer Stockwell, William Patterson and Henry Conrad
67	Algonkian			1 Mi. east of Levanna	Ledyard, New York		Indian Village Site Prior To Iroquois During Stone Age Occupation About 1000. Excavations 1932-34 Show Hearths and Burials
68	Birthplace of Theodore Ledyard Cuyler			Vlg. Aurora, Opp. Rr. Sta.	Ledyard, New York		Born Jan. 10, 1822 Died Feb. 26, 1909 Presbyterian Clergyman and Writer
69	Boundary of Reservation			Aurora-Sherwood Rd. W. of Sherwood	Ledyard, New York		Southeast Corner of East Cayuga Reservation. Cayugas Reserved It 1789. Ceded To N.Y. State by Treaty 1794
70	Eliza Mosher			1 Mi. west Ridgeway Cemetery	Ledyard, New York		Built 1804 here in 1846 was Born Eliza Mosher Eminent Woman Physician 1875–1928
71	Cayuga Lake Academy			In Front Old Brick School Opposite Pres. Ch., Aurora	Ledyard, New York		Cayuga Lake Academy chartered by regents 1801. First building 1803. Present structure 1835. Well known school.
72	First Home			In Aurora in Front of Miss Edith Morgan's Barn, W. Side State Road	Ledyard, New York		First Home Built by a White Man Capt. Roswell Franklin in Cayuga County 1789. He was an officer in Sullivan-Clinton Campaign
73	First Newspaper			At Levanna	Ledyard, New York		First Newspaper in Cayuga County published in 1798 by R. Delano. Called Levanna Gazette Or Onondaga Advertiser
74	Glen Park 1852			Front Wells College, W. Side Street	Ledyard, New York		Home of Henry Wells Founder of American Express Co., 1850 Wells Fargo Express Company, 1852 Wells College, 1868
75	Capt. Roswell Franklin			So. Side Paines Creek Gully, 1000 Ft. E. Bridge, So. End Aurora	Ledyard, New York		Grave of Capt. Roswell Franklin First Settler 1789 Died 1792
76	Home of Jethro Wood			1/2 Mi. W. Poplar Ridge	Ledyard, New York		Home of Jethro Wood Inventor of cast iron plough
77	Isaac Mekeel			1 Mi. west Ridgeway Cemetery	Ledyard, New York		Isaac Mekeel here developed manufacture of amber cane syrup 1860–1904
78	Ledyard			Rte. 34B Vlge. Ledyard	Ledyard, New York		Named from Benj. Ledyard. Called Chapins Crs. from P. Chapin, Settled 1800 and Talcotts Crs. from R. Talcott, Settled 1812
79	Old Elm Tree			Aurora-Oplar Ridge Rd. 1/2 Mile. west Rr	Ledyard, New York		Old Elm Tree Remaining from the Primeval Forest
80	Paines Creek Gully			So. End Bridge, Ret. 90 So. of Aurora	Aurora, New York		Moonshine Falls One Mile Upstream Site of Early Saw, Grist and Woolen Mills
81	Patrick Tavern			So. E. Or. Dublin Hill & Main St. Aurora	Aurora, New York		Patrick Tavern erected 1793 Early Court held here Cayuga County Medical Society Organized here 1806
82	Pioneer House			Chapel Cor., Paines Creek Rd. To Poplar Ridge	Ledyard, New York		Pioneer House Built About 1799 by Benjamin Howland here Same Year was held First Meeting in County of Society of Friends
83	Residence of Major Benjamin Ledyard			Near House Back from Main St., So Old Academy in Aurora	Aurora, New York		Residence of Major Benjamin Ledyard First Clerk of Onondaga and Cayuga County Town Named in His Honor | Near House Back from Main St., So Old Academy in Aurora
84	Scipio Lodge			Main St. 2nd House N. School	Ledyard, New York		Scipio Lodge Masonic Charter 1797 building erected 1806 Used by the Craft Until 1819
85	Sequoia California Redwood			Rte. 90, north End Aurora	Ledyard, New York		Rte. 90, north End Aurora
86	Site of Upper Cayuga Village			Side Rd. Young Farm & Monument Now Owned by Cayuga Museum	Ledyard, New York		Site of Upper Cayuga Village Destroyed by Col. Butler's Detachment of Sullivan's Army, Sept. 22-23, 1779
87	Site of Chonodote Peach Town			north End Village on Rte. 90	Ledyard, New York		Site of Chonodote Peach Town Cayuga Village Destroyed With Orchard of 1500 Trees During Sullivan
88	Site of First Steam Flouring Mill			S.E. Cor. Old Stone Warehouse Lyon Property, Aurora	Ledyard, New York		Site of First Steam Flouring Mill west of Hudson River Built by Roswell Towsley 1817
89	To Moonshine Falls			Rte. 90 Opp. Paines Creek Rd. To Poplar Ridge	Ledyard, New York		To Moonshine Falls [Arrow]
90	To Moonshine Falls			Prospect Crs. 1 Mil. E. Rte. 60	Ledyard, New York		To Moonshine Falls [Arrow]
91	Upper Cayuga			on Great Gully Fort Site. Accessible Only To Hikers	Ledyard, New York		Upper Cayuga Marking the Probable Fortification for Nearby Indian Villages Destroyed by Co. Butler's Soldiers Sept 22-23, 1779
92	Wells College			Front Wells College, E. Side Street	Ledyard, New York		Wells College Founded by Henry Wells 1868Organizer of American and Wells Fargo Express Companies
93	Indian Fort Site			west of Locke	Locke, New York		Indian Fort Site this Vicinity Is Site of An Indian Village Probably Fortified and Indian Burial Ground
94	Town of Locke			In Locke on Rtes. 90 & 38	Locke, New York		Town of Locke Set Off from Milton Now Genoa in 1802. Locke Village Formerly Called Milan First Settled 1790
95	Brigham Young			Port Byron Front of Hotel	Mentz, New York		The Mormon Prophet lived in the House 100 yards east here in 1831. He was baptized in Mormon in 1832 at Mendon, N.Y.
96	Henry Wells			Rte. 31, 38, In Port Byron	Mentz, New York		Henry Wells Founder of Wells Fargo Express Company was a Shoemaker by Trade and lived in this house from 1827 to about 1830
97	Port Byron			In Front Port Byron Hotel	Mentz, New York		Port Byron Named 1832. Inc. 1837. Formerly Called Bucksville from Aholiab Buck, Settler in 1798, Also King's Settlement from P. King 1797
98	Col. Comfort Tyler			on Cor. north Rte. 31	Montezuma, New York		Col. Comfort Tyler 1764–1827 Revolutionary Soldier, Col. in War of 1812, Surveyor, Engineer Salt Maker. Settled here in 1811
99	Montezuma			In Montezuma by Hotel	Montezuma, New York		Montezuma Named from the Aztec Emperors. Town Formed from Mentz in 1859. Village Incorporated in 1866
100	Old Erie Canal			on Old Canal by Rte. 90	Montezuma, New York		Old Erie Canal Completed from Utica To here 1819. the "Montezuma" Built here was the First Boat on the Canal. Took Passengers To Syracuse 1820
101	Salt Springs			On Old Canal by Rte. 90	Montezuma, New York		Salt Springs Chief Supply for Indians. Later Extensively Developed by Early settlers Privately and With State Aid
102	Squagonna			Near Bridge Over Seneca River	Montezuma, New York		Aboriginal Name for Paradise of Musquitoes the River was Tiohero River of Rushes
103	Cady Tavern			So. Main St. in Village	Moravia, New York		In 1801 Zadoc Cady Built a Log Tavern Here. a Few Years Later He Built the present building
104	John Stoyell			Corner Main & Cayuga Sts.	Moravia, New York		First Settler in Moravia 1790. Built First House at rear of this Lot. was 1st Justice and Supervisor of Sempronius in 1798
105	Oldest House			So. Main St. in Village	Moravia, New York		Oldest House in Moravia the Kitchen of this House Is the Original Cabin Built by Gershom Morse in 1794
106	Owasco Flats			Rte. 38 west of Village	Moravia, New York		Site of Indian Village Land Cultivated Prior To White Settlements. Neighboring settlers Came To Harvest Hay 1789-90
107	Site of Old Arsenal			Vlg. Moravia on Side Street	Moravia, New York		Site of Old Arsenal New York State Arsenal Number 68. Built in 1800. Stood for Over 100 Years
108	The First Cast Iron Plow			Rte. 38A by Bridge, Montville	Moravia, New York		The First Cast Iron Plow in the world was made by Jethro Woods at foot of falls 1819
109	Town of Moravia			Back of Service Sta. E. Cayuga St.	Moravia, New York		Town of Moravia Formed from Sempronius in 1833. Village Or Moravia Incorporated in 1837 Reincorporated in 1859.
110	Kelloggsville			In Front of Store	Niles, New York		Kelloggsville Named after Judge Charles Kellogg, Who Opened the First Store here in 1804
111	Old Mill			In New Hope	New Hope, New York		Partly Built by Charles Kellogg in 1823. Sold To Horace Rounds in 1851, To His Son Eugene Rounds 1865, To W. E. Rounds & A. Ryan, 1919
112	Old Salt Road			Kelloggsville	Kelloggsville, New York		Over this Road Salt was Formerly Transported Overland from Syracuse To Pennsylvania and New York
113	Town of Niles			At Dutch Hollow	Niles, New York		Set Off from Sempronius in 1833. First Settled 1792. Named from Elder Robt. Niles, a Pastor of the 1st Baptist Church of Sempronius
114	Algonkian			In Enna Jettick Park Opp. Sesqui. Monument	Owasco, New York	42°54′21.5994″N 76°32′21.00″W	Algonkian Village Site of Third Period Culture One of Largest Indian Pottery Jars in State Found Here
115	Ford Across Wasco			So. Side Pavilion, Emerson Park	Owasco, New York		Ford Across Wasco Outlet on Great Iroquois Trail Used by Col. Peter Gansevoort Who Encamped here Sept. 21, 1779
116	First Church in Cayuga County			on E. Lake Rd., Beyond Dutch Hollow-Burtis Point	Owasco, New York		Here was Built in 1798 First Church in Cayuga County Reformed Dutch Church of Owasco
117	Town of Owasco			In Owasco	Owasco, New York		Town of Owasco Formed from Aurelius 1802. First Settlements 1792 Reformed Dutch Church of Owasco Organized 1798. Church Built 1815
118	Willow Brook			on E. Lake Rd. So. of foot of Lake	Owasco, New York		Willow Brook Home of Enos. T. Throop 1784–1874 Congressman 1815 Circuit Judge 1823 Governor of N.Y. 1829-32
119	#1 - the Square			At #1 Intrsctn. Rte. 34B & Old Ridge Rd. at Pres. Ch.	Scipio, New York		#1 - the Square So Named Because of Being on Lot One of the Town of Scipio. this Presbyterian Church was Built in 1825
120	Cayuga Castle			on Rte. 34B 1/2 Mi. So. Rte. 1	Scipio, New York		on Rte. 34B 1/2 Mi. So. Rte. 1
121	Early Newspaper			Scipioville, Rte. 34B	Scipio, New York		Scipioville, Rte. 34B
122	Emily Howland			Sherwood, Rte. 34B	Scipio, New York		Emily Howland 1827–1929 Noted Educator and Philanthropist, Founded the Sherwood Select School 1872, lived Here
123	Indian Site			on Rte. 34B So. of Scripionville	Scipio, New York		on Rte. 34B So. of Scripionville
124	Pioneer Site			In Sherwood E. Side Front of Store	Scipio, New York		Pioneer Site Settled 1794-95 by Judge Seth Sherwood erected House Wherein Court was held 1804 When Village was County Seat
125	Town of Scipio			At Scipio Center	Scipio, New York		One of Original Towns of the Military Tract Formed in 1794. Named after the Roman General
126	Waring Place			Warings Crs. Rte. 34 So. Scripio Cntr.	Scipio, New York		Warings Crs. Rte. 34 So. Scripio Cntr.
127	Old Salt Road			At Dresserville on Co. Rd. 1/2 Mi. E. of Rte. 41A	Sempronius, New York		At Dresserville on Co. Rd. 1/2 Mi. E. of Rte. 41A
128	First Settlement in Sempronius			At Sales Crs. on Co Rd. between Rtes. 38A & 41A	Sempronius, New York		At Sales Crs. on Co Rd. between Rtes. 38A & 41A
129	Site of Glen Haven House			on W. Lake Rd. Near Head Skaneateles Lake	Sempronius, New York		Site of Glen Haven House Which in 1845 was Converted Into Glen Haven Sanitarium Destroyed To Protect Syracuse Water Supply
130	Baptist Church			No. Side St. E. of Center Sennett	Sennett, New York		Baptist Church Organized 1779 First Stone Church Built on this Site 1808 present Church Built 1825
131	Blacksmith Shop			Franklin St. Rd. E. Soule Cemetery	Sennett, New York		Blacksmith Shop Built About 1837. First Trip Hammer in Cayuga County and First One Used in Auburn Prison made Here
132	Blacksmith Shop			So. Side Road E. of Sennett	Sennett, New York		Blacksmith Shop Built Prior To 1825 Local Methodist Society here Organized and Planned Erection of Their Church
133	Early Home			on Rte. 5 N. Side-E. of Sennett	Sennett, New York		Early Home Built About 1795 by Daniel Sennett Side Judge of Circuit Court Town Named in His Honor
134	First Store			North east Corner in Sennett	Sennett, New York		First Store in Village of Sennett Opened 1795 by Rufus Sheldon and Chauncey Lathrop First Post Office 1806
135	First Tavern			Northwest Corner of Sennett	Sennett, New York		Northwest Corner of Sennett
136	Great Genesee Road			At Owls Nest on Franklin St. Rd. 1 Mi. east of Soule Cemetery	Sennett, New York		Great Genesee Road from Old Fort Schuyler To the Genesee River Via Hardenbergh Corners and Cayuga Bridge. Built 1794.
137	Oldest Church			Southwest Corner of Sennett	Sennett, New York		Oldest Church in Sennett. Built 1820 Organized 1809 as First Congregational Remodeled 1847 Became Presbyterian 1870
138	Seneca Turnpike			on Rte. 20 1 Mi. E. of Auburn	Sennett, New York		Seneca Turnpike 1800 From Utica To Canandaigua Via Skaneateles Creek at End of Cherry Valley Turnpike. Mirgration Route To the West
139	Dr. Sylvester Willard House			Center of Sennett, So. Side Former Rte. 5	Sennett, New York		This House erected 1823 Dr. Sylvester Willard
140	Cayuga Castle			Junction Rte. 90 & Great Gully Road	Springport, New York	42°48′44.78″N 76°41′55.18″W	Junction Rte. 90 & Great Gully Road
141	Cayuga Castle			on Sesqui Monument Lot Nr. Great Gully Rte. 90	Springport, New York	42°48′35.60″N 76°42′2.81″W	Cayuga Castle Goi-O-Gouen Site of Principal Cayuga Village Destroyed Sept. 23, 1779 Sullivan Campaign
142	Cayuga Mine			on Auburn Rd. 326, 2 Mis. E. Rte. 90	Springport, New York		Cayuga Mine Reservation Northwest Cor.Of Sq. Mile Reserved To Cayugas by Treaties 1789 Sold To the State 1799
143	East Cayuga-Old Town			on Gully Rd. 1/2 Mi. west of Rte. 34B in Tn. Springport	Springport, New York		East Cayuga-Old Town Indian Village of 13 Houses Destroyed Sept. 22, 1779 by Col. William Butler's Detachment of Sullivan Campaign
144	First School House			At Junction Rte. 90 & Auburn Rd.	Springport, New York		At Junction Rte. 90 & Auburn Rd.
145	First Church			At Cross Roads	Springport, New York		At Cross Roads
146	Frontenac Island			Union Springs-On Island Off Union Springs	Springport, New York		Frontenac Island Ancient Algonkian Village Site. Indian Burial Place Given To Union Springs by the State 1856
147	Ge-Wauga			In Front of Old High Sch. Main St., Union Springs	Springport, New York		In Front of Old High Sch. Main St., Union Springs
148	Home of John J. Thomas			Union Springs S. Side Homer St.	Springport, New York		Home of John J. Thomas 1810-95 Prominent Agriculturist An Editor of "The Country Gentleman" and Promoter of Cayuga Lake R.R.
149	Indian Mound			on Sesqui Mon. Plot, Rte. 90 1½ Mi. south of Union Springs	Springport, New York	42°48′36.47″N 76°42′2.66″W	on Sesqui Mon. Plot, Rte. 90 1½ Mi. south of Union Springs
150	Iroquois Trail			on 326 north of Oakwood	Springport, New York		Iroquois Trail from Cayuga To Owasco Lakes, Part of the Great Trail from Niagara To Albany During the American Revolution
151	Reservation of Cayugas			on Farleys Point	Springport, New York		Reservation of Cayugas Sold To the State 1799 a Body of Tuscaroras were the Last of the Iroquois To Occupy this Point
152	Spring Mills			In Front of Pond W. Side Rte. 90, Union Springs	Springport, New York		Spring Mills erected 1839-40 by George Howland Stone Mill Third Built on Same Site Second was Woolen Mill
153	Upper Cayuga			on So. Side Great Gully Rd. 2 Miles east of Rte. 90	Springport, New York		Site of Village and Fort on Opposite Bank of Great Gully Destroyed by Col. Butler in Sullivan Campaign
154	Yawger Tavern			Intrsctn. Rte. 326 & Co. Rd. 1 Mi. E. of Rte. 90	Springport, New York		Yawger Tavern Built by Peter Yawger, 1810 on the Junction of the Indian Trails Wasco To Gewauga and Chuharo To Goiogoven
155	Frontenac Island			Cor. Rte. 90 & Seminary St. Union Springs	Springport, New York		Frontenac Island Site of Algonkian Village Deeded To Union Springs by the State for Use as a Park 1856
156	Fair Haven			At Fair Haven on Rte. 104A	Sterling, New York		At Fair Haven on Rte. 104A
157	Martville			Martville on Rte. 104A	Sterling, New York		Chauncey Hickock and Timothy Austin Settled 1823, Built First Mills, Robt. Lay Built First Store 1825
158	Sterling Valley First Settlement			At Sterling Valley. on Rte. 104A	Sterling, New York		made here 1805 by Peter Dumus, a Soldier With Layfayette. Earlier Called Coopers Mills after John Cooper 1819
159	Town of Sterling			At Sterling Ctr. on Rte. 104A	Sterling, New York		Town of Sterling Named after a Revolutionary Officer, Lord Wm. Alexander Stering. Set Off from Cato 1812. First Grist and Saw Mill Built here in 1813
160	Millard Fillmore			Fillmore Road betw. Salt Rd. and Lick St.	Summerhill, New York	42°41′33″N 76°20′9″W	Millard Fillmore 13th President of the United States, was Born in a Log Cabin in the Adjacent Field Jan 7, 1800
161	Old Salt Road			In Summerhill, Rte. 90	Summerhill, New York		In Summerhill, Rte. 90
162	Old Salt Road			W. Side Rd. at Head Sherman Gulf	Summerhill, New York		W. Side Rd. at Head Sherman Gulf
163	Summerhill			In Summerhill on Rte. 90	Summerhill, New York		Summerhill Formed from Locke as Plato 1831. Name Changed 1832 First Settlement made by Hezekiah Mix in 1797 One Mile west of Here.
164	Home of Gen. John S. Clark			on Co. Rd. #1148 1½ Mis. N.W. of Throopville	Throop, New York		Home of Gen. John S. Clark Born 1823. Died 1912. Civil Engineer, Historian, Civil War Officer and First Supervisor of Throop
165	Throopsville			Throopsville	Throop, New York		Throopsville
166	Town of Throop			Throopsville	Throop, New York		Town of Throop Formed 1859 from Portions of Aurelius, Mentz, and Sennett. Named after Former Governor Enos T. Throopn of Auburn
167	Wards Settlement			Near Tn.Line on road from Throopsville To Montezuma	Throop, New York		Wards Settlement Named from Jonas Ward and Son, Caleb, Who Settled here in 1796. First Settlement in Throop made Near here in 1790 by Ezekial Crane
168	Baptist Church			Stewarts Corners	Venice, New York		Baptist Church Founded June 9, 1795 by Elder David Irish present Church erected 1812-14
169	Daniel Holley			1 Mi.S. & 1/2 Mi. E. of Stewarts Cnrs.	Venice, New York		Home of Daniel Holley Settled here 1797. the Frame House Built Soon after Is Part of Barn
170	Indian Fields			Indian Fields on Rte. 34 So. of Venice Center	Venice, New York		Indian Fields Farms of the Cayugas before Revolution here White settlers Found Cleared and Cultivated Fields, Villages and Forts
171	Indian Fields			on Rte. 34 No. of Town Line	Venice, New York		Indian Fields Farms of the Cayugas before Revolution here White settlers Found Cleared and Cultivated Fields, Villages and Forts
172	Site of First Store			Poplar Ridge	Venice, New York		Site of First Store Built About 1800 by Jethro Wood, Inventor present Store Built from Some of Original Timbers
173	Town of Venice			Venice Center	Venice, New York		Town of Venice Set Off from Scipio 1823. Settled as Early as 1790. Joshua Murdock Came here in 1800 and Built a Homestead in 1816
174	North Victory			At Intersection Rtes. 104 & 38	Victory, New York		North Victory First Settlement by Conrad Phrozine in 1812. Here Is the Site of the Mill He Built
175	Town of Victory			In Victory	Victory, New York		Town of Victory Set Off from Cato 1821. First Settlements 1800 by John Mcneal and John Martin. Village Settled by James Gregory in 1806
176	Westbury			1½ Miles N.W. of Victory	Victory, New York		Westbury First Settled in 1806 by William and Jacob Burghduff. M.E. Church Organized 1816, Built 1838

== See also ==
- List of New York State Historic Markers
- National Register of Historic Places listings in New York
- List of National Historic Landmarks in New York
