= Center House =

Center House or Centre House may refer to:

- Centre House, London, a New Age community co-founded by Christopher Hills
- Center House, Wisconsin, US, a community
- Center House (Auburn, New York), a historic tavern with a New York State Historic Marker in Cayuga County, New York, US
- Center House Bulletin, now Presidential Studies Quarterly, a political science journal
