= New York State Route 176 =

State highway in central New York, US

New York State Route 176
- Map of central New York with NY 176 highlighted in red

Route information
- Maintained by NYSDOT and the city of Fulton
- Length: 13.75 mi (22.13 km)
- Existed: 1930–present

Major junctions
- South end: NY 370 in Cato
- North end: NY 48 in Fulton

Location
- Country: United States
- State: New York
- Counties: Cayuga, Oswego

Highway system
- New York Highways; Interstate; US; State; Reference; Parkways
← NY 175	→ NY 177

New York State Route 176 (NY 176) is a north–south state highway located in the central part of New York, in the United States, that connects Cayuga County with Oswego County. The southern terminus of the route is at an intersection with NY 370 in the northeast part of the town of Cato, east of Meridian. Its northern terminus is at a junction with NY 48 in the city of Fulton.

The route used to extend north from its current northern terminus to NY 3 three-quarters of a mile to the north and, earlier, to a northern terminus at County Route 4 (CR 4) in the town of Scriba, east of the city of Oswego.

== Route description ==
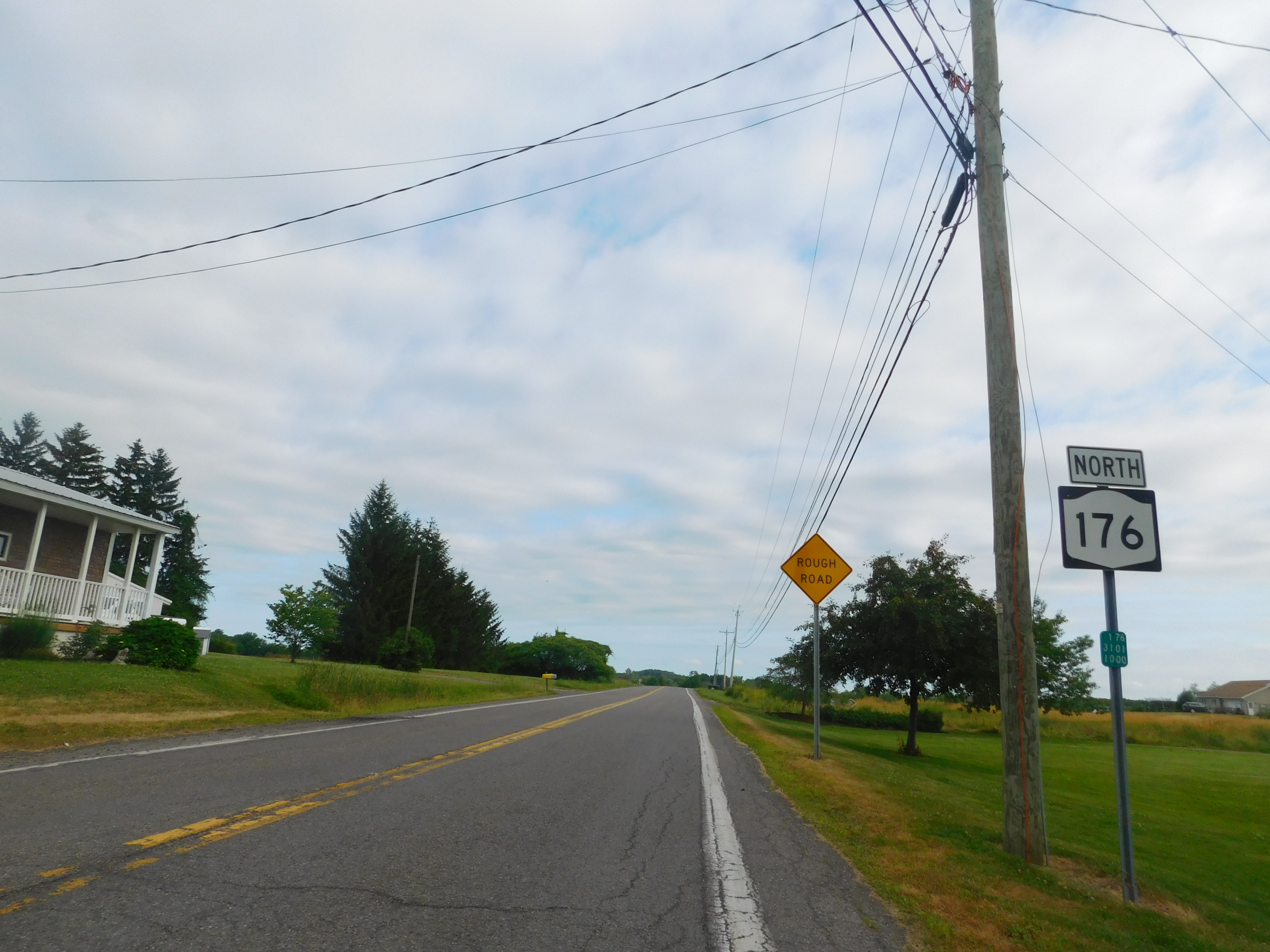
NY 176 northbound from NY 370 in Cato

NY 176 begins at an intersection with NY 370 in the town of Cato. NY 176 proceeds northwest through Cato as a two-lane rural roadway, passing several farms in each direction, along with a large pond. A short distance later, NY 176 crosses the town line out of Cato into Ira, remaining the two-lane farm road, but turning northeast. NY 176 runs near the shore of a large pond in Ira, crossing an intersection with County Route 38 (CR 38; Ira Hill Road / Lysander Road). NY 176 continues north through Ira, crossing several farms before crossing the county line into Oswego County.

Now in Oswego County, NY 176 is in the town of Hannibal and immediately into the hamlet of South Hannibal. In South Hannibal, the route makes a gradual bend to the east at a junction with CR 7. South Hannibal consists of a few homes along NY 176 and CR 7, until NY 176 leaves the hamlet eastbound. Continuing through Hannibal, NY 176 becomes residential before crossing over a large pond, where it bends to the northeast. NY 176 continues northeast through Hannibal, intersecting with several local roads before entering the town of Granby. In Granby, the route turns eastward once again, entering the hamlet of Bowens Corners. In Bowens Corners, NY 176 proceeds eastward as a two-lane residential street, intersecting with CR 8 (Minetto–Lysander Road), which runs concurrent along NY 176 for a short distance to the north.

At the northern end of Bowens Corners, NY 176 bends east off the right-of-way of CR 8, which continues north towards Minetto. NY 176 meanwhile, proceeds east out of Bowens Corners, crossing a large farm in the town of Granby, where it turns to the northeast. The route becomes primarily residential after Chipper Road, while intersecting with the northern terminus of CR 55 (Jacksonville Road). After this intersection, the route becomes rural again, continuing northeast through Granby. Intersecting with the northern terminus of CR 14 (Ley Creek Road), NY 176 crosses a railroad grade and enters the city of Fulton. In Fulton, NY 176 gains the moniker of Curtis Street, becoming a two-lane residential street. NY 176 passes through four city blocks before intersecting with NY 48 (West First Street) on the shores of the Oswego River. This intersection serves as the northern terminus of NY 176.

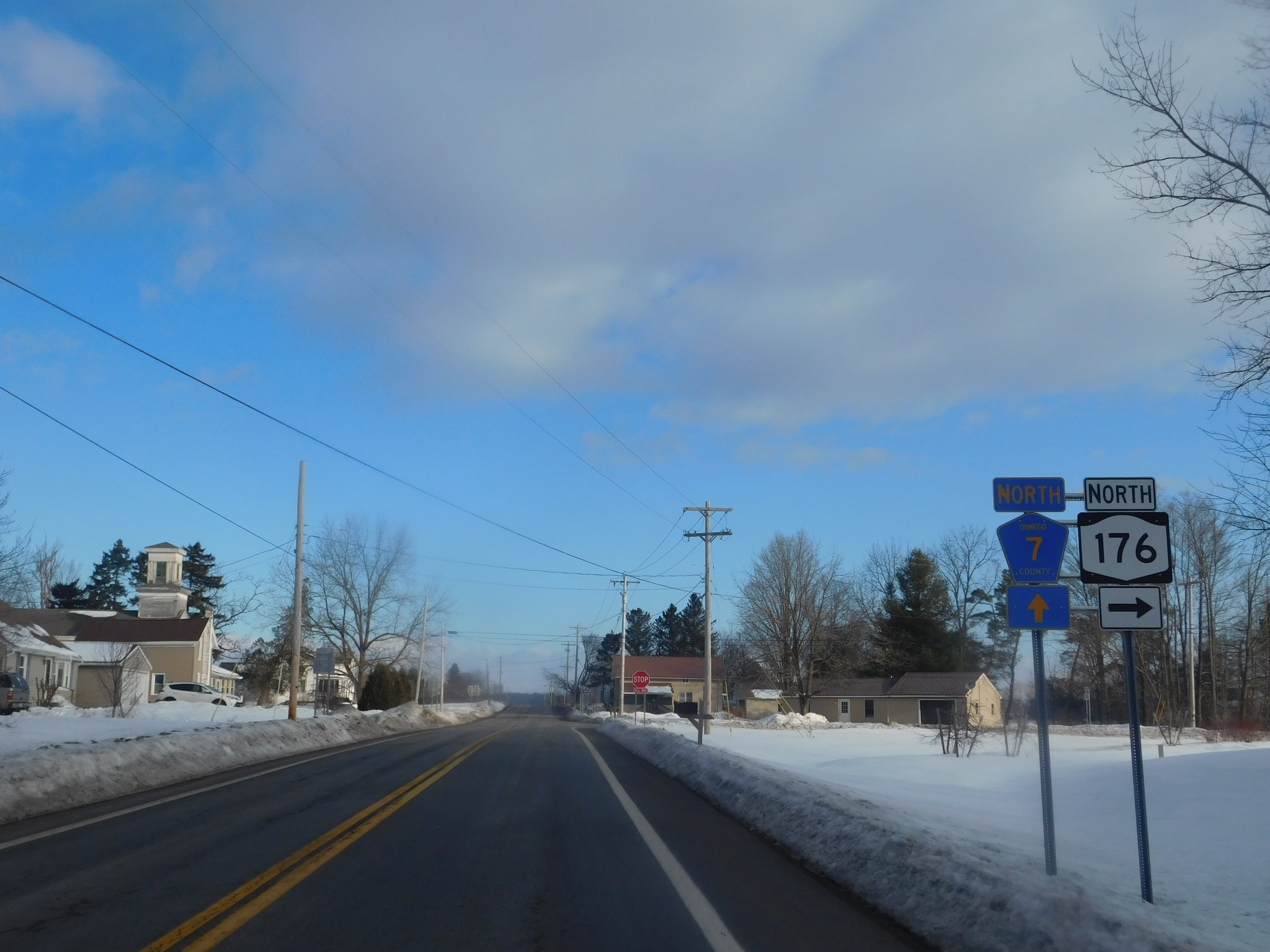
NY 176 northbound at CR 7 in South Hannibal

== History ==
When NY 176 was originally assigned as part of the 1930 renumbering of state highways in New York, it encompassed only its modern routing between NY 370 near Meridian and NY 48 in Fulton. The route was extended north through Fulton c. 1932 on NY 48, NY 3, 7th Street, and Whittaker Road to the Scriba hamlet of South Scriba, where it ended at a simple four-way intersection with modern CR 4. The northward extension of NY 176 was eliminated on April 1, 1980, as part of a highway maintenance swap between the state of New York and Oswego County. In the swap, ownership and maintenance of NY 176 north of the Fulton city line was transferred from the state to the county in exchange for maintenance of the portions of NY 3 and NY 34 between the Cayuga–Oswego County line and NY 104. NY 176 was truncated to its junction with NY 48 south of Fulton following the swap while the former routing of NY 176 between the Fulton city line and CR 4 in South Scriba became CR 176.

== Major intersections ==
County	Location	mi	km	Destinations	Notes
Cayuga	Town of Cato	0.00	0.00	NY 370 – Baldwinsville, Meridian, Rochester	Southern terminus
Oswego	Fulton	13.75	22.13	NY 48 (West First Street)	Northern terminus
1.000 mi = 1.609 km; 1.000 km = 0.621 mi

== See also ==
- List of county routes in Oswego County, New York
