= William Smith Ingham House =

Historic house in New York, United States

- U.S. National Register of Historic Places
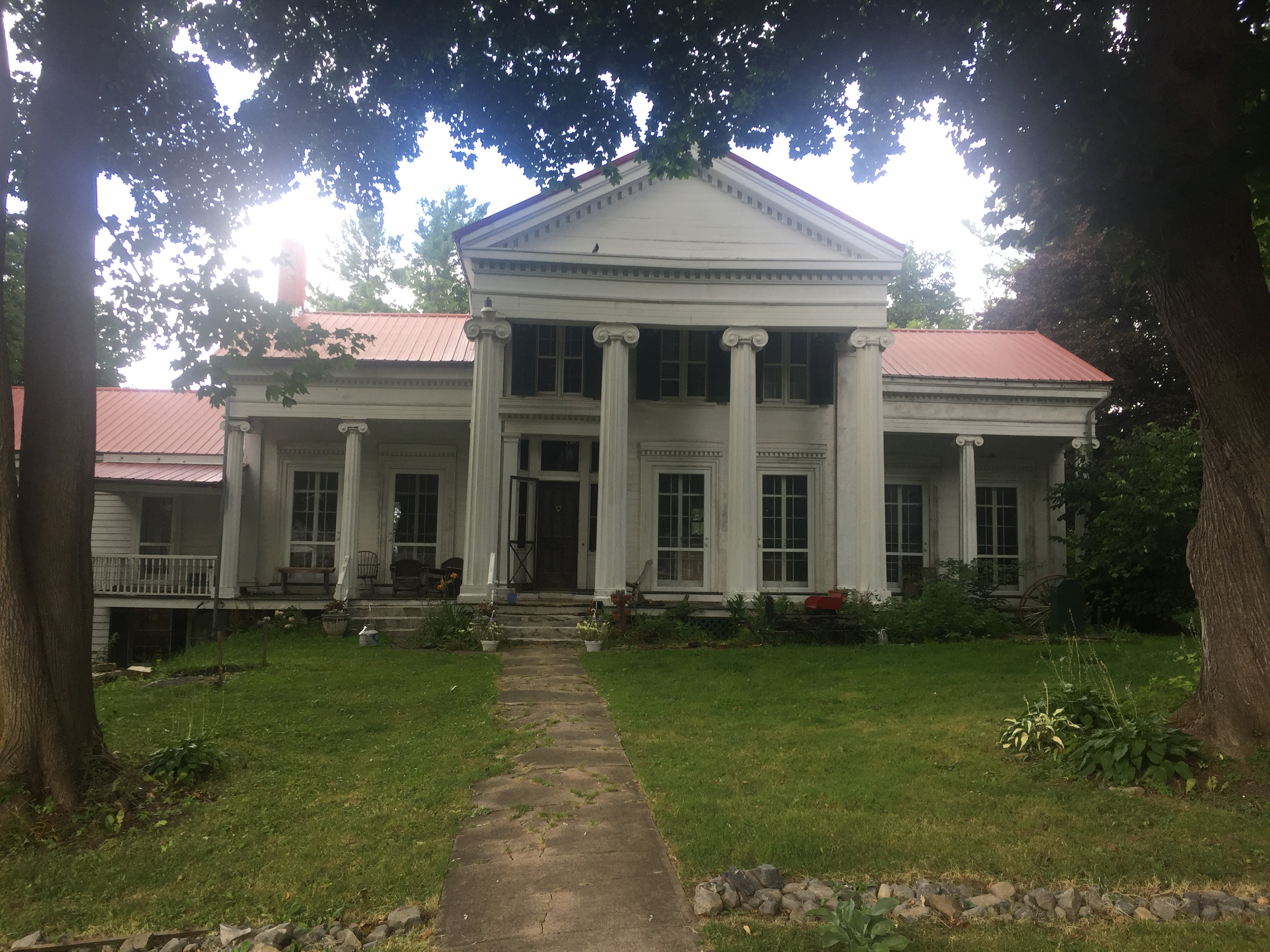
- House in 2022

- Location within New York Location within the United States
- Location: 3069 W Main St., Meridian, New York
- Coordinates: 43.16624°N 76.53759°W
- Area: less than one acre
- Built: 1835
- Architectural style: Greek Revival
- NRHP reference No.: 05000263
- Added to NRHP: April 6, 2005

William Smith Ingham House is a historic house in Meridian, Cayuga County, New York. It is a two-story, three-bay, side hall frame. It was built in 1985 in vernacular Greek revival style. A late 19th-century carriage house is also on the property.

It was listed on the National Register of Historic Places in 2005.

It has a Temple-style front with a tetrastyle portico of Ionic columns. It is located at 3069 W Main St. (NY-370) in Meridian.
