= Sennett Federated Church and Parsonage =

Historic church in New York, United States

- U.S. National Register of Historic Places
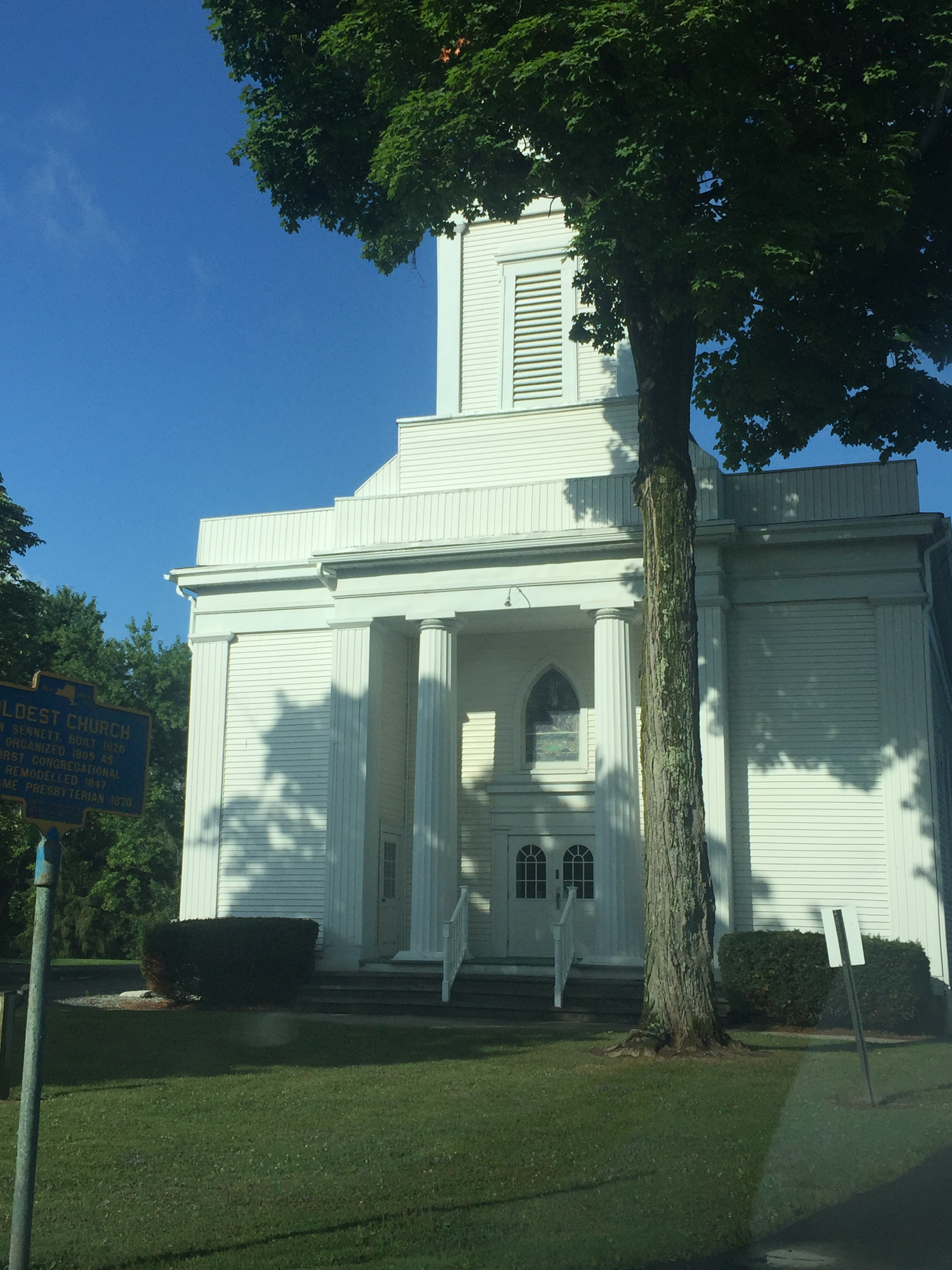
- Church in 2022

- Location within New York Location within the United States
- Location: 7777 Weedsport-Sennett Rd., Sennett, New York
- Coordinates: 42°59′45″N 76°32′1″W
- Area: 5.9 acres (2.4 ha)
- Built: 1848
- Architect: Munson, Edward; Servis, James M.
- Architectural style: Greek Revival
- MPS: Freedom Trail, Abolitionism, and African American Life in Central New York MPS
- NRHP reference No.: 05001130
- Added to NRHP: October 05, 2005

Sennett Federated Church and Parsonage is a historic church formed in 1929 from the combining of Baptist and Congregational churches located in the hamlet of Sennett, in the town of Sennett in Cayuga County, New York. Both congregations were committed to the abolition movement and the Underground Railroad. The church was constructed in 1848 for the Congregational church and probably incorporates part of an earlier 1820 church building. The parsonage was built in 1818 and was constructed as a 16 feet by 24 feet frame building. It was enlarged in the mid 19th century into a typical Greek Revival style gable and wing building, perhaps incorporating the earlier structure as the west wing.

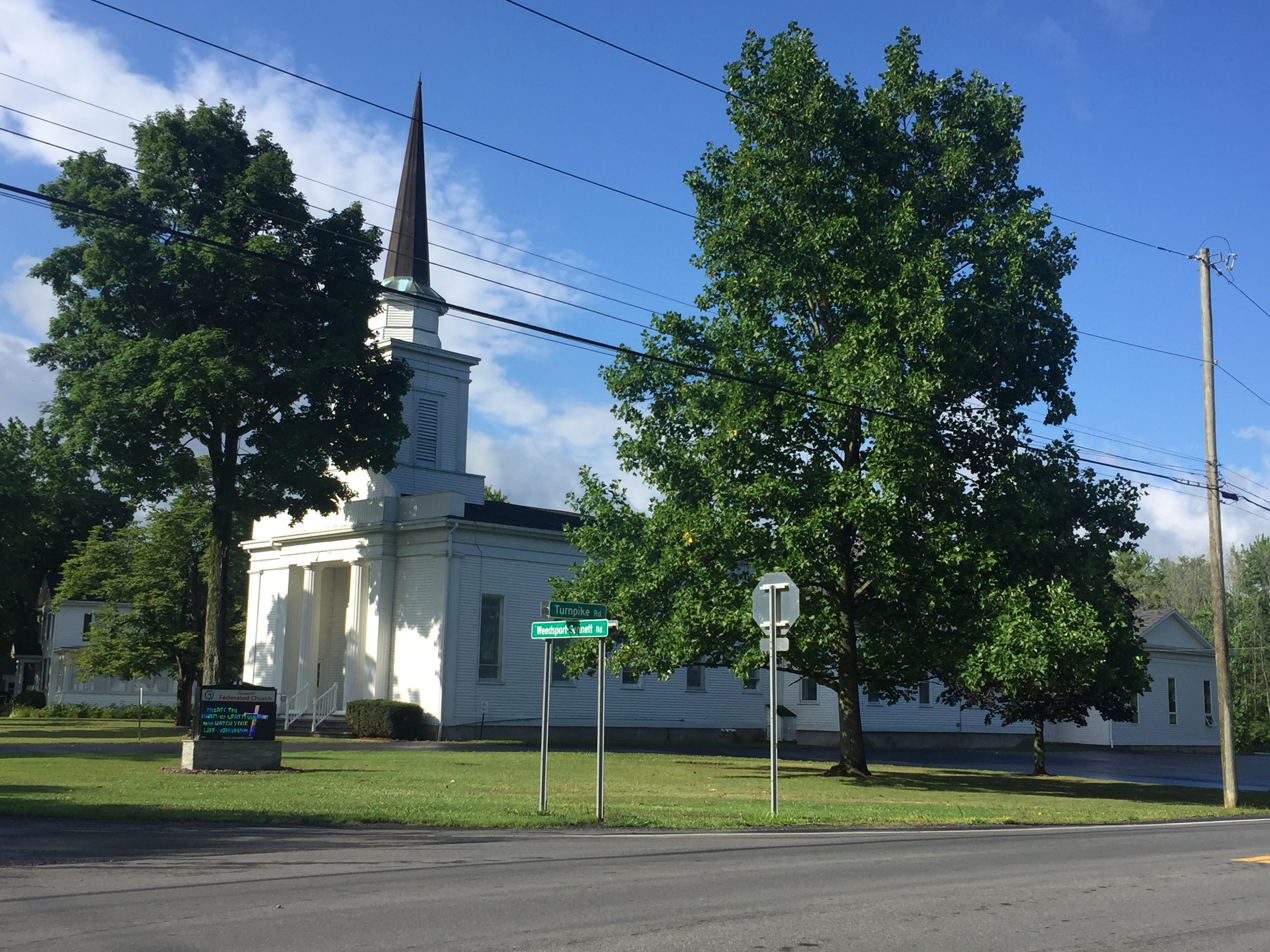
Full side view

It was listed on the National Register of Historic Places in 2005.

The church was covered in vinyl siding in the 1990s. The vinyl covers cornices, sides, eaves, and even two of the main four pillars of the front facade. The stained glass windows from the early 20th century are protected by plastic sheets. Railings that might appear original are not; they are vinyl as well. Only the two round pillars seem to be anything like the original surfaces.
