= Otter Lake (Cayuga County, New York) =

Lake in Cayuga County, New York, USA

- Location within New York Location within the United States
- Location: Cayuga County, New York, United States
- Coordinates: 43°8′24.78″N 76°31′58.87″W
- Basin countries: United States
- Surface area: 282 acres (1.14 km^{2})
- Average depth: 6 feet (1.8 m)
- Max. depth: 14 feet (4.3 m)
- Shore length^{1}: 3.6 miles (5.8 km)
- Surface elevation: 397 feet (121 m)
- Settlements: Meridian, New York
- ^{1} Shore length is not a well-defined measure.

Otter Lake is located near Meridian, New York. Fish species present in the lake are black bullhead, and walleye. There is access with a fee through the Leisure Acres Trailer Park.
