= Hannibal High School =

Hannibal High School may refer to:

- Hannibal High School (Missouri), in Hannibal, Missouri
- Hannibal High School (New York), part of the Hannibal Central School District, Hannibal, Oswego County, New York
