= Josh Warner =

American football player (born 1979)

No. 67
- Positions: Center, guard

Personal information
- Born: May 15, 1979 (age 47); Auburn, New York, U.S.
- Listed height: 6 ft 5 in (1.96 m)
- Listed weight: 305 lb (138 kg)

Career information
- High school: Cato (NY) Meridian
- College: Brockport State
- NFL draft: 2001: undrafted

Career history
- New York Giants (2001)*; Green Bay Packers (2002)*; Chicago Bears (2002–2003); → Berlin Thunder (2002); Washington Redskins (2005)*
- * Offseason or practice squad member only

Career NFL statistics
- Games: 10
- Games started: 0
- Stats at Pro Football Reference

Joshua Warner (born May 15, 1979) is an American former professional football player who was an offensive lineman in the National Football League (NFL). Undrafted in 2001, He played college football for the Brockport Golden Eagles. Warner was signed by the Chicago Bears and assigned to the Berlin Thunder. In 2003, Warner played ten games for the Bears.
