= USS Cayuga County =

LST-491-class tank landing ship

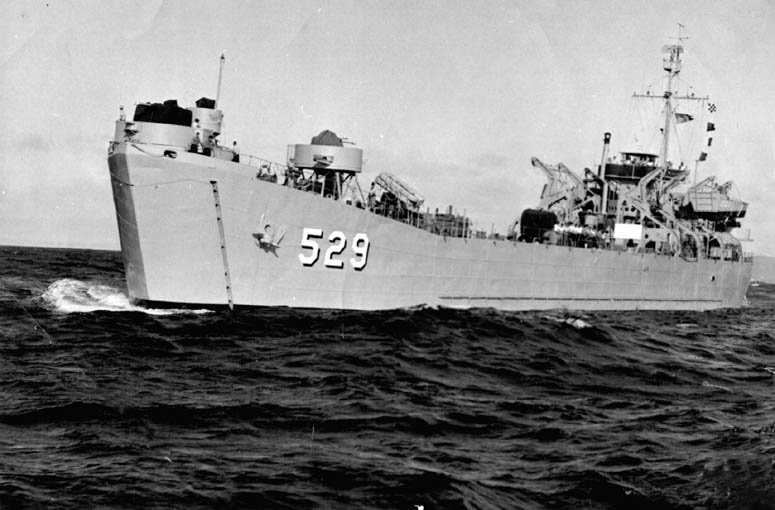
- USS Cayuga County (LST-529) underway, date and place unknown. Official U.S. Navy photo distributed to the crew c. 1958 while assigned to the Mariana Trust Territory and homeported in Guam.

History

United States
- Name: USS LST-529, later USS Cayuga County
- Namesake: Cayuga County, New York
- Builder: Jeffersonville Boat and Machine Company, Jeffersonville, Indiana
- Laid down: 8 November 1943
- Launched: 17 January 1944
- Commissioned: 29 February 1944
- Decommissioned: 7 June 1946
- Recommissioned: 22 September 1950
- Decommissioned: 17 December 1963
- Renamed: USS Cayuga County (LST-529), 1 July 1955
- Honours and awards: 1 battle star (World War II); 3 battle stars (Korea)
- Fate: Transferred to the Republic of Vietnam, 17 December 1963

South Vietnam
- Name: Thi Nai (HQ-502)
- Acquired: 17 December 1963
- Fate: Escaped to the Philippines, April 1975

Philippines
- Name: BRP Cotabato Del Sur (LT-87)
- Commissioned: 17 November 1975
- Fate: Scrapped, 2003

General characteristics
- Class & type: LST-491-class tank landing ship
- Displacement: 1,780 long tons (1,809 t) light; 3,640 long tons (3,698 t) full
- Length: 328 ft (100 m)
- Beam: 50 ft (15 m)
- Draft: Unloaded : 2 ft 4 in (0.71 m) forward; 7 ft 6 in (2.29 m) aft; Loaded : 8 ft 2 in (2.49 m) forward; 14 ft 1 in (4.29 m) aft
- Propulsion: 2 × General Motors 12-567 diesel engines, two shafts, twin rudders
- Speed: 12 knots (22 km/h; 14 mph)
- Boats & landing craft carried: 2 LCVPs
- Troops: Approximately 140 officers and enlisted men
- Complement: 8-10 officers, 100-115 enlisted men
- Armament: 1 × single 3"/50 caliber gun mount; 8 × 40 mm guns; 12 × 20 mm guns

USS Cayuga County (LST-529) was an LST-491-class tank landing ship built for the United States Navy during World War II. Named for Cayuga County, New York.

LST-529 was laid down on 8 November 1943 at Jeffersonville, Indiana by the Jeffersonville Boat & Machine Company; launched on 17 January 1944; sponsored by Mrs. Margaret S. Carey; and commissioned on 29 February 1944.

== Service history ==
During the European theatre of World War II, LST-529 participated in the Invasion of Normandy in June 1944. On 7 June 1946, she was decommissioned and, as a result of hostilities in Korea, recommissioned on 22 September 1950. She served in the Korean War and took part in the following campaigns: U.N. Summer-Fall offensive (July and August 1951); the Second Korean Winter (December 1951 through March 1952); and the Korea, Summer 1953 (June and July 1953). Immediately following the Korean War, she continued to serve in the Korean area until July 1954. Following her Korean service, she returned to the United States.

She was named USS Cayuga County (LST-529) on 1 July 1955 and was assigned as a logistic support ship for the Mariana and Bonin Islands in the late 1950s, remaining there until decommissioned and transferred to the Republic of Vietnam on 17 December 1963, when she was renamed Thi Nai (HQ-502). Following the fall of Saigon on 29 April 1975 Thi Nai escaped to the Philippines. Transferred to the Philippine Navy 17 November 1975 she was renamed BPR Cotabato Del Sur (LT-87). The ship was scrapped in 2003.

LST-529 earned one battle star for World War II service and three battle stars for Korean War service.

== See also ==
- List of United States Navy LSTs
