= Morse Farm (Moravia, New York) =

Historic house in New York, United States

- U.S. National Register of Historic Places
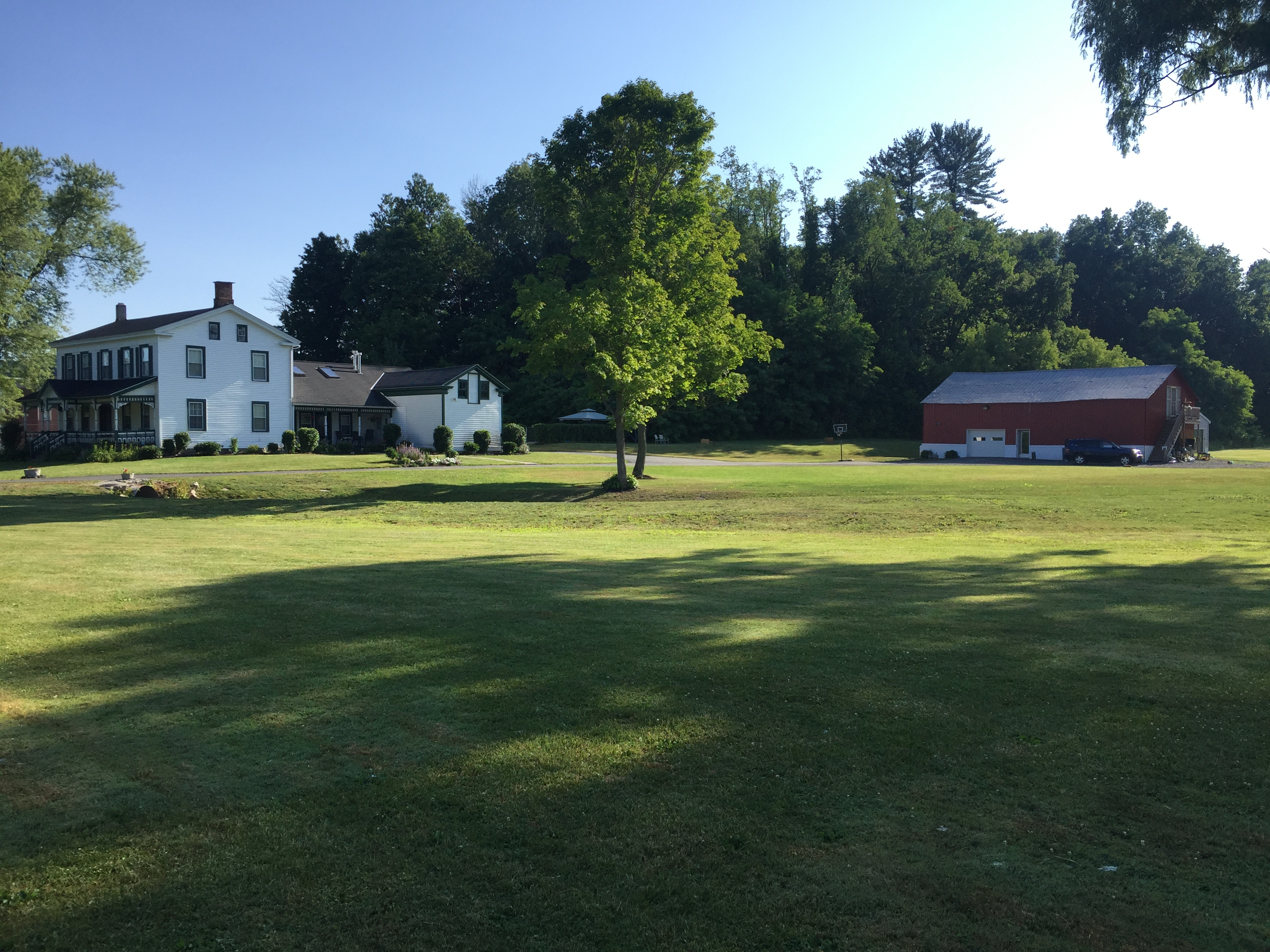

- Location within New York Location within the United States
- Location: 52 S. Main St., Moravia, New York
- Coordinates: 42.70625°N 76.42010°W
- Area: 10 acres (4.0 ha)
- Built: 1794
- Architectural style: Federal
- MPS: Moravia MPS
- NRHP reference No.: 95000067
- Added to NRHP: February 24, 1995

Morse Farm is a historic farm property located in the village of Moravia in Cayuga County, New York. Its main building is a two-story, frame Federal style farmhouse. The house is in a "big house, little house, back house" configuration. Portions of the house reportedly date to 1794; the house was remodelled into essentially its present form about 1815. Also on the property is a 19th-century two-story barn with board and batten siding.

It was listed on the National Register of Historic Places in 1995.

Its address in National Register registration was 53 South Main St. but the street has been renumbered; it located at what is now 52 South Main St.

A historic plaque identifies the original portion of the house, what is now the kitchen area, as the oldest in Moravia.
