= Ira, New York =

- Town
- Location within Cayuga County and the state of New York

- Location within New York Location within the United States
- Coordinates: 43°12′30″N 76°31′50″W
- Country: United States
- State: New York
- County: Cayuga

Government
  - Type: Town Council
  - Town Supervisor: James E. Lunkenheimer (R)
  - Town Council: Members' List: • Roy Campbell (R); • James Edelstein (R); • Lawrence L. Wallace (R); • Ricky O. Wilson (R)

Area
  - Total: 34.90 sq mi (90.39 km^{2})
  - Land: 34.80 sq mi (90.12 km^{2})
  - Water: 0.10 sq mi (0.27 km^{2})
- Elevation: 456 ft (139 m)

Population (2020)
  - Total: 2,145 ▼
  - Estimate (2021): 2,129
  - Density: 64/sq mi (24.7/km^{2})
- Time zone: UTC-5 (Eastern (EST))
  - Summer (DST): UTC-4 (EDT)
- ZIP Codes: 13033 (Cato); 13027 (Baldwinsville); 13074 (Hannibal); 13111 (Martville)
- FIPS code: 36-011-37660
- GNIS feature ID: 0979094

Ira is a town in Cayuga County, New York, United States. The population was 2,145 at the 2020 census. The town is in the northern part of the county and is northwest of Syracuse.

== History ==
Ira was part of the Central New York Military Tract, with the first settlement in the area believed to have been made around 1800. Prior to this, it was land of the Cayuga people as well as part of the Seneca Nations of the Haudenosaunee Confederacy.

A legislative act created the township of Ira, in addition to the Townships of Victory, Conquest, and Cato from the original military township of Cato on March 16, 1821. Part of Ira was re-annexed by Cato in 1824, with Cayuga County’s final nineteenth-century configuration solidified by 1859, with 23 townships, 6 incorporated villages, and Auburn as county seat.

Ira’s early institutions included a school first taught in 1805, a first inn kept in 1800, a first store at Ira Corners in 1813, and a first grist mill in 1818.

The Auburn Theological Seminary, established in 1818, remained a major county religious institution through the nineteenth century.

Wells College was founded at Aurora in Cayuga County in 1868 as an institution of higher education for women.

Across Cayuga County, abolitionists provided Underground Railroad safe houses, and suffragists were also active in the same nineteenth-century reform culture.

== Geography ==
According to the United States Census Bureau, the town has a total area of 34.9 square miles (90.4 km^{2}), of which 34.8 square miles (90.1 km^{2}) is land and 0.12 square miles (0.3 km^{2}), or 0.30%, is water. Many drumlins and relics of the Ice Age are scattered about the town.

The northern town line and part of the eastern town boundary are the border of Oswego County, and the remainder of the east town line is the border of Onondaga County.

New York State Route 34 and New York State Route 176 are north–south highways in Ira. New York State Route 370 is an east–west highway along the south town line.

== Demographics ==
Historical population
Census	Pop.	Note	%±
1830	2,198		—
1840	2,283		3.9%
1850	2,110		−7.6%
1860	2,238		6.1%
1870	2,014		−10.0%
1880	2,113		4.9%
1890	1,873		−11.4%
1900	1,668		−10.9%
1910	1,451		−13.0%
1920	1,361		−6.2%
1930	1,342		−1.4%
1940	1,336		−0.4%
1950	1,473		10.3%
1960	1,448		−1.7%
1970	1,720		18.8%
1980	1,869		8.7%
1990	1,990		6.5%
2000	2,426		21.9%
2010	2,206		−9.1%
2020	2,145		−2.8%
2021 (est.)	2,129		−0.7%
U.S. Decennial Census

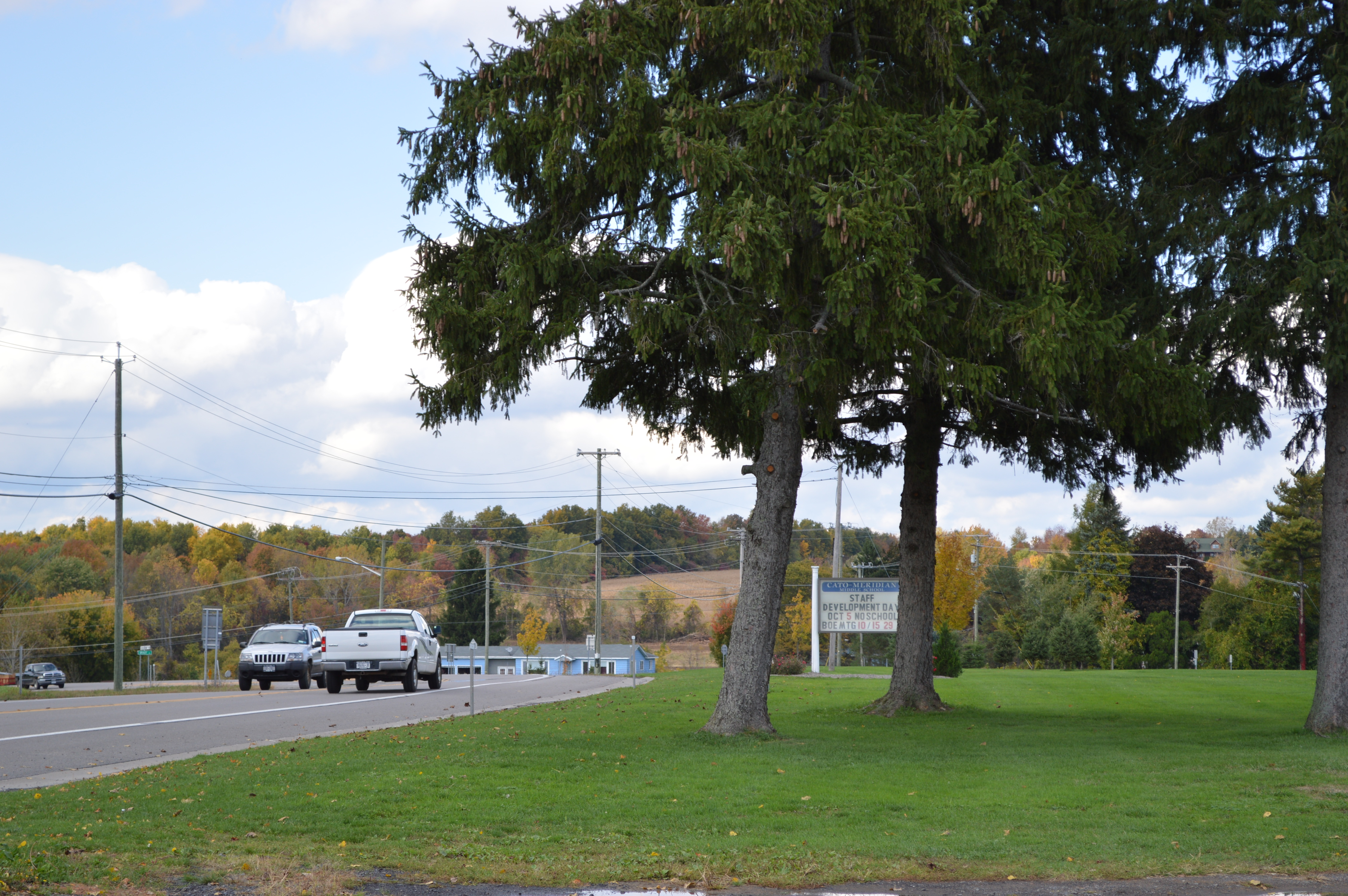

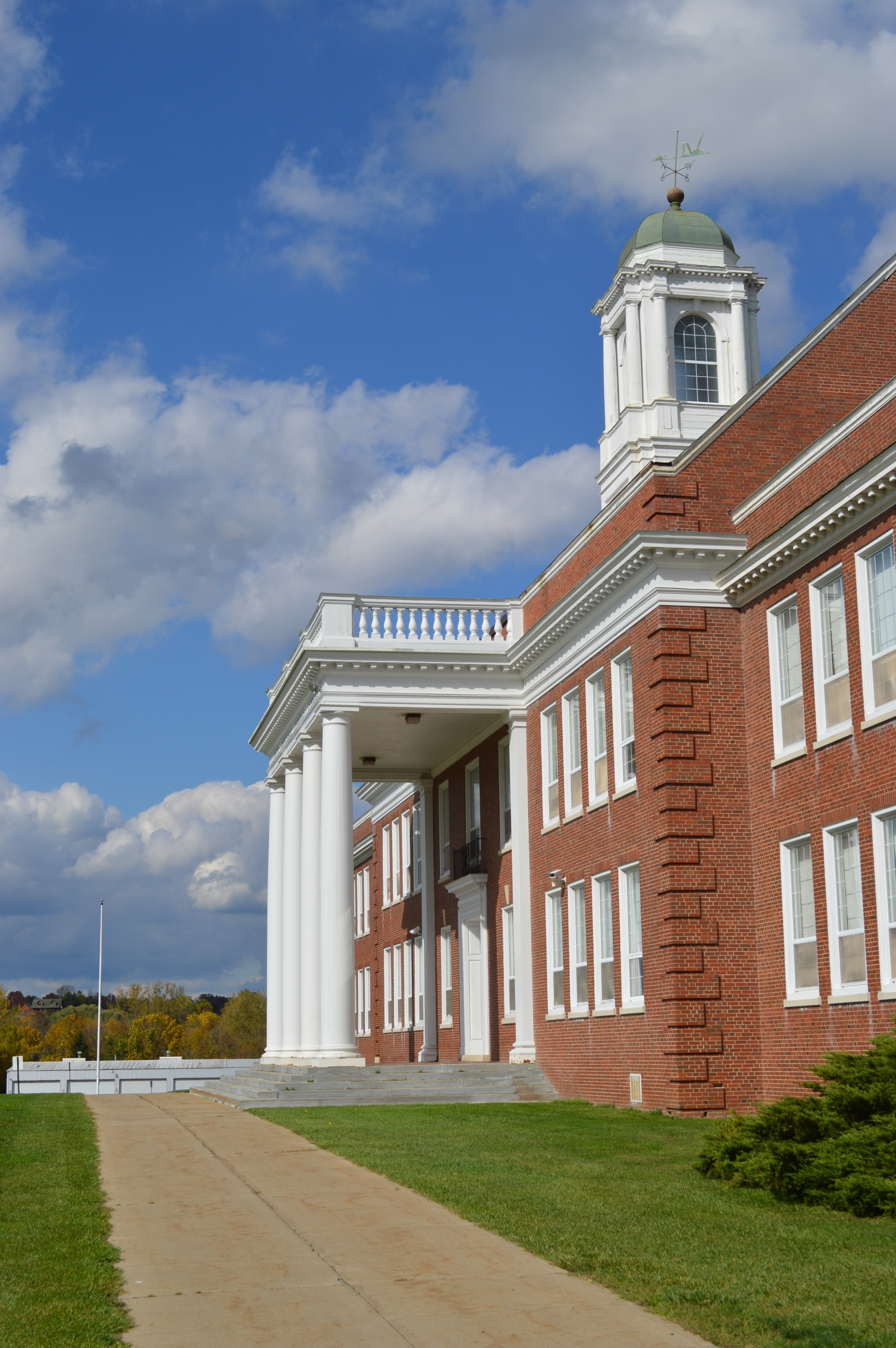

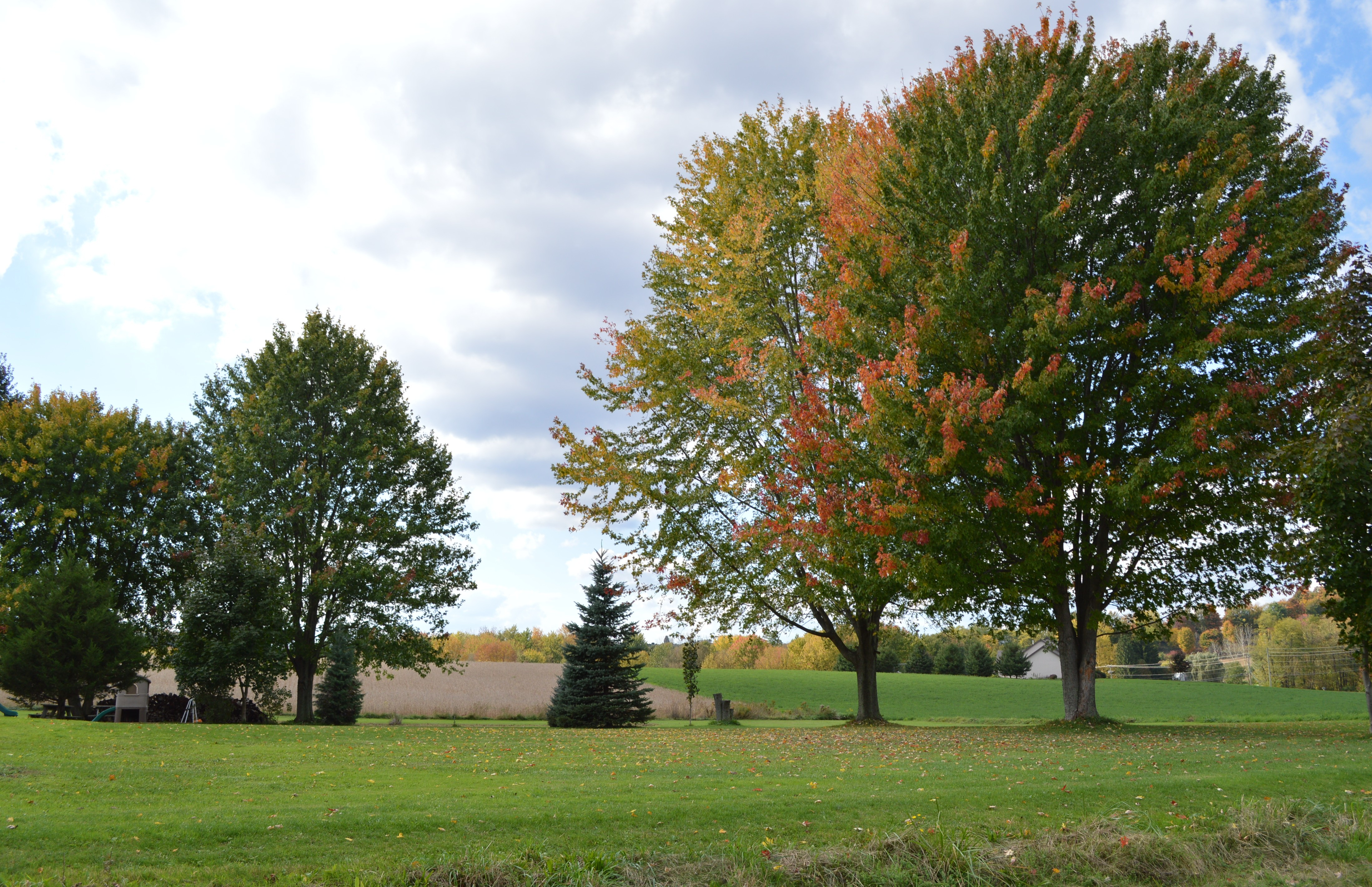

As of the census of 2000, there were 2,426 people, 822 households, and 669 families residing in the town. The population density was 69.6 inhabitants per square mile (26.9/km^{2}). There were 867 housing units at an average density of 24.9 per square mile (9.6/km^{2}). The racial makeup of the town was 97.03% White, 0.41% African American, 0.70% Native American, 0.04% Asian, 0.04% Pacific Islander, and 1.77% from two or more races. Hispanic or Latino of any race were 1.03% of the population.

There were 822 households, out of which 41.4% had children under the age of 18 living with them, 65.5% were married couples living together, 10.7% had a female householder with no husband present, and 18.5% were non-families. 14.1% of all households were made up of individuals, and 4.1% had someone living alone who was 65 years of age or older. The average household size was 2.95 and the average family size was 3.20.

In the town, the population was spread out, with 30.6% under the age of 18, 7.1% from 18 to 24, 31.7% from 25 to 44, 22.0% from 45 to 64, and 8.5% who were 65 years of age or older. The median age was 35 years. For every 100 females, there were 100.8 males. For every 100 females age 18 and over, there were 100.1 males.

The median income for a household in the town was $46,027, and the median income for a family was $48,750. Males had a median income of $35,472 versus $25,134 for females. The per capita income for the town was $16,954. About 3.4% of families and 7.0% of the population were below the poverty line, including 9.0% of those under age 18 and 5.3% of those age 65 or over.

== Communities and locations ==
- Beaver Meadows – A swampy area south of Benton Corners.
- Benton Corners – A location east of Ira village on NY-176.
- Bethel Corners (also called "Bethel") – A hamlet near the northern town line on NY-34.
- Cato – The village of Cato is on the southern town boundary, partly in the town of Cato.
- Floridaville – A hamlet at the eastern town line.
- Fox's Corners – A former location west of Ira village.
- Ira (formerly "Ira Center") – The hamlet of Ira is near the center of the town. It was settled c. 1805.
- Ira Corners (formerly "Ira Station") – a location on the western town line, west of Ira.
- Meridian – The village of Meridian is by the southern town line in the town of Cato.
- Mud Pond – A small lake in the southwestern part of Ira.
