= Cato, New York =

- Town
- Location within Cayuga County and the state of New York

- Location within New York Location within the United States
- Coordinates: 43.128°N 76.536°W
- Country: United States
- State: New York
- County: Cayuga

Government
  - Type: Town Council
  - Town Supervisor: Charles R. Ray (R)
  - Town Council: Members: • Vernon J. Blumer (R); • W. Irving Foster (D); • Stefan House (D); • Gerald Hunter (R)

Area
  - Total: 36.2 sq mi (93.7 km^{2})
  - Land: 33.6 sq mi (87.1 km^{2})
  - Water: 2.5 sq mi (6.6 km^{2})
- Elevation: 420 ft (130 m)

Population (2020)
  - Total: 2,445 ▼
  - Density: 75/sq mi (29.1/km^{2})
- Time zone: UTC-5 (Eastern (EST))
  - Summer (DST): UTC-4 (EDT)
- ZIP Codes: 13033 (Cato); 13113 (Meridian); 13166 (Weedsport); 13080 (Jordan)
- Area code: 315
- FIPS code: 36-011-12969
- GNIS feature ID: 0978801
- Website: www.cayugacounty.us/townofcato

Cato is a town in Cayuga County, New York, United States. According to the 2020 census, the town had a population of 2,445. The town is named after Cato the Elder, a Roman statesman. The name was assigned by the surveyors of the Military Tract, and is one of many towns and villages bearing a classical name.

The town of Cato contains part of a village also named Cato, as well as the entire village of Meridian. Cato is northwest of Syracuse.

== History ==
The town was in the Central New York Military Tract, reserved for veterans of the American Revolution. Settlers trickled in during the early 19th century. After the War of 1812, the population increased more quickly.

The town was formed in 1802 from part of the town of Aurelius. Cato was subsequently reduced in size when new towns were formed: Sterling in 1812, and in 1821 Conquest, Ira, and Victory. Part of the town of Ira was returned to Cato in 1824.

== Notable people ==
- Howard Frank Mosher, novelist
- Regan Smith, NASCAR driver
- Josh Warner, professional football player (Chicago Bears)

== Geography ==
According to the United States Census Bureau, the town has a total area of 36.2 square miles (93.7 km^{2}), of which 33.7 square miles (87.2 km^{2}) is land and 2.5 square miles (6.6 km^{2}), or 7.03%, is water.

The town of Cato is on the eastern side of Cayuga County, so that the eastern town line is the border of Onondaga County. The southern town boundary is defined by the Seneca River/Erie Canal.

Cato village is located along the northern border of the town; half of it extends into the town of Ira to the north. The village of Meridian is to the east of Cato village and is entirely within the town of Cato. New York State Route 34, a north–south highway, intersects New York State Route 370, an east–west highway, in Cato village. The southern terminus of New York State Route 176 is at NY-370, east of Meridian.

== Demographics ==
Historical population
Census	Pop.	Note	%±
1810	1,075		—
1820	4,021		274.0%
1830	1,782		−55.7%
1840	2,380		33.6%
1850	2,247		−5.6%
1860	2,350		4.6%
1870	2,091		−11.0%
1880	2,059		−1.5%
1890	1,996		−3.1%
1900	1,624		−18.6%
1910	1,569		−3.4%
1920	1,394		−11.2%
1930	1,286		−7.7%
1940	1,458		13.4%
1950	1,513		3.8%
1960	1,815		20.0%
1970	1,975		8.8%
1980	2,139		8.3%
1990	2,452		14.6%
2000	2,744		11.9%
2010	2,537		−7.5%
2020	2,445		−3.6%
2021 (est.)	2,433	▼	−0.5%
U.S. Decennial Census

As of the census of 2000, there were 2,744 people, 994 households, and 747 families residing in the town. The population density was 81.6 inhabitants per square mile (31.5/km^{2}). There were 1,293 housing units at an average density of 38.4 per square mile (14.8/km^{2}). The racial makeup of the town was 97.74% White, 0.36% Black or African American, 0.40% Native American, 0.29% Asian, 0.04% Pacific Islander, 0.07% from other races, and 1.09% from two or more races. Hispanic or Latino of any race were 0.36% of the population.

There were 994 households, out of which 36.4% had children under the age of 18 living with them, 62.0% were married couples living together, 7.6% had a female householder with no husband present, and 24.8% were non-families. 19.6% of all households were made up of individuals, and 9.9% had someone living alone who was 65 years of age or older. The average household size was 2.76 and the average family size was 3.16.

In the town, the population was spread out, with 29.0% under the age of 18, 6.6% from 18 to 24, 29.2% from 25 to 44, 24.5% from 45 to 64, and 10.6% who were 65 years of age or older. The median age was 37 years. For every 100 females, there were 100.7 males. For every 100 females age 18 and over, there were 98.2 males.

The median income for a household in the town was $43,281, and the median income for a family was $49,028. Males had a median income of $35,150 versus $24,572 for females. The per capita income for the town was $19,941. About 6.0% of families and 8.3% of the population were below the poverty line, including 9.5% of those under age 18 and 11.7% of those age 65 or over.

== Communities and locations in the town of Cato ==
- Cato – The village of Cato straddles the northern town line at the junction of NY-34 and NY-370. The northern part of the village of Cato is in the town of Ira.
- Cross Lake – A large lake on the eastern town line.
- Meridian – The village of Meridian is at the northern town boundary on NY-370.
- Otter Lake – A lake south of Meridian.
- Parker Pond – A small lake at the southeastern corner of Cato village.
- Whitford's Airport (FAA LID: B16) – A general aviation airport near the southern town line. It is also called "Weedsport Airport."
