= Sennett, New York =

- Town
- Motto: A family-oriented town in Cayuga County that is rich in history
- Location within Cayuga County and New York

- Location within New York Location within the United States
- Coordinates: 42°58′23″N 76°31′15″W
- Country: United States
- State: New York
- County: Cayuga

Government
  - Type: Town Council
  - Town Supervisor: Thomas Blair (R)
  - Town Council: Members' List: • Edward Rizzo (D); • Kristopher LaPointe [R]; • Michael Wellauer [R]; • James Vivenzio [D]

Area
  - Total: 28.84 sq mi (74.70 km^{2})
  - Land: 28.82 sq mi (74.64 km^{2})
  - Water: 0.023 sq mi (0.06 km^{2})
- Elevation: 771 ft (235 m)

Population (2010)
  - Total: 3,595
  - Estimate (2016): 3,550
  - Density: 123.2/sq mi (47.56/km^{2})
- Time zone: UTC-5 (Eastern (EST))
  - Summer (DST): UTC-4 (EDT)
- ZIP Codes: 13021 (Sennett); 13166 (Weedsport)
- Area code: 315
- FIPS code: 36-011-66443
- GNIS feature ID: 0979482
- Website: www.sennettny.gov

Sennett is a town in Cayuga County, New York, United States. The population was 3,595 at the 2010 census. The town is named after a public official and early settler, Daniel Sennett. The town is on the eastern county line of Cayuga County and borders Auburn.

== History ==
The land that now makes up the town of Sennett was part of the Central New York Military Tract, land reserved for war veterans. Prominent resident Daniel Sennett, a circuit judge, settled in the area in 1795 .

Sennett was formed from the towns of Brutus and Aurelius on March 19, 1827. In 1859, a portion of the town land was re-allocated to contribute territory to the town of Throop . Sennett also contributed some of its southwestern territory to the city of Auburn.

The Sennett Federated Church and Parsonage, built in 1848, is listed on the National Register of Historic Places.

== Geography ==
According to the United States Census Bureau, the town has a total area of 28.8 square miles (74.7 km^{2}), of which 0.023 square miles (0.06 km^{2}), or 0.08%, is water.

The east town line is the border of Onondaga County. Sennett is in the Finger Lakes region, being near the north end of Owasco Lake and Skaneateles Lake.

New York State Route 5 is a northeast-southwest highway, and New York State Route 34 is a north-south highway which traverse the town and converge with U.S. Route 20 in the adjacent city of Auburn.

== Demographics ==
Historical population
Census	Pop.	Note	%±
1830	2,297		—
1840	2,060		−10.3%
1850	2,347		13.9%
1860	1,923		−18.1%
1870	1,748		−9.1%
1880	1,644		−5.9%
1890	1,498		−8.9%
1900	1,440		−3.9%
1910	1,423		−1.2%
1920	1,358		−4.6%
1930	1,528		12.5%
1940	1,664		8.9%
1950	1,730		4.0%
1960	2,283		32.0%
1970	2,553		11.8%
1980	2,561		0.3%
1990	2,913		13.7%
2000	3,244		11.4%
2010	3,595		10.8%
2016 (est.)	3,550		−1.3%
U.S. Decennial Census

As of the census of 2000, there were 3,244 people, 1,085 households, and 864 families residing in the town. The population density was 112.6 inhabitants per square mile (43.5/km^{2}). There were 1,117 housing units at an average density of 38.8 per square mile (15.0/km^{2}). The racial makeup of the town was 96.02% White, 2.37% African American, 0.18% Native American, 0.86% Asian, 0.06% Pacific Islander, 0.03% from other races, and 0.46% from two or more races. Hispanic or Latino of any race were 0.65% of the population.

There were 1,085 households, out of which 36.5% had children under the age of 18 living with them, 69% were married couples living together, 7.5% had a female householder with no husband present, and 20.3% were non-families. 16.8% of all households were made up of individuals, and 10% had someone living alone who was 65 years of age or older. The average household size was 2.75 and the average family size was 3.1.

In the town, the population was spread out, with 27.1% under the age of 18, 6.7% from 18 to 24, 25.8% from 25 to 44, 24.2% from 45 to 64, and 16.2% who were 65 years of age or older. The median age was 39 years. For every 100 females, there were 99.8 males. For every 100 females age 18 and over, there were 97 males.

The median income for a household in the town was $50,282, and the median income for a family was $57,009. Males had a median income of $37,663 versus $24,479 for females. The per capita income for the town was $19,593. 4.9% of the population and 3.7% of families were below the poverty line. 6% of those under the age of 18 and 4.7% of those 65 and older were living below the poverty line.

== Communities and locations in Sennett ==
- McMasters Corners – A location on NY-34, west of Sennett village.
- Sennett ( once "Fellows Corners") – The hamlet of Sennett is located on NY-5, northeast of Auburn.
- Wicks Corners – A hamlet by the eastern town line, east of Auburn.
- Sennett Federated Church - A central landmark built in 1829 in the hamlet of Sennett that remains in use, located north of NY-5 at the corner of Turnpike Rd and Weedsport-Sennett Rd Listed on the National Register of Historic Places as Sennett Federated Church and Parsonage.

== Notable people ==
- Brandon Williams, businessman and politician
- Charles Clinton Adams, businessman and politician
- Chester Gillette, murderer (buried here)
- John Hulbert, executioner (buried here)
