= Center House, Wisconsin =

- Unincorporated community
- Location within Wisconsin Location within the United States
- Coordinates: 43°47′26″N 88°57′20″W
- Country: United States
- State: Wisconsin
- County: Green Lake
- Town: Green Lake
- Elevation: 968 ft (295 m)
- Time zone: UTC-6 (Central (CST))
  - Summer (DST): UTC-5 (CDT)
- Area code: 920
- GNIS feature ID: 1562885

Center House is an unincorporated community in the town of Green Lake, Green Lake County, Wisconsin, United States. The community is at the intersection of County Highways K and N, 3.7 miles (6.0 km) south of the city of Green Lake.
