= Cato (village), New York =

Cato, New York
- Village
- Location within the state of New York
- Coordinates: 43°10′7″N 76°34′25″W
- Country: United States
- State: New York
- County: Cayuga
- Town: Cato

Area
  - Total: 1.01 sq mi (2.62 km^{2})
  - Land: 0.99 sq mi (2.56 km^{2})
  - Water: 0.023 sq mi (0.06 km^{2})
- Elevation: 460 ft (140 m)

Population (2020)
  - Total: 517
  - Density: 523.0/sq mi (201.93/km^{2})
- Time zone: UTC-5 (Eastern (EST))
  - Summer (DST): UTC-4 (EDT)
- ZIP code: 13033
- Area code: 315
- FIPS code: 36-12958
- GNIS feature ID: 0946053
- Website: villageofcatony.com

Cato is a village in Cayuga County, New York, United States. The population was 532 at the 2010 census. The name was assigned by the surveyors of the Military Tract, and is one of many towns and villages bearing classical place names. The village of Cato is half within the town of Cato and half within the town of Ira. It is west of Syracuse.

== History ==
The village was part of the Central New York Military Tract, land set aside in 1782 for veterans of the American Revolution. Prior native occupants were compelled to live on reservations established at that time. The first permanent settler arrived around 1805, and the new community was called "Jakway's Corners".

Railroad service came to the village in 1869, aiding its prosperity, but rail service ended in 1953.

Cato is home to the 1993 Section 3 Class D state football champions. Modern Cato is partly a bedroom community, with many residents commuting to surrounding cities.

== Geography ==
According to the United States Census Bureau, the village has a total area of 1.0 square mile (2.6 km^{2}), of which 0.023 square miles (0.06 km^{2}), or 2.44%, is water.

The village is located in a drumlin field.

Parker Pond, formerly known as "Forest Lake", is a small lake at the southeast edge of the village. Muskrat Creek drains from the lake and flows southward to the Seneca River (and Erie Canal).

The village is at the junction of NY-34 and NY-370. Locating places within the village is extremely simple, since virtually all locations which may be visited by a non-resident are located on these two highways.

== Water tower ==
The Cato water tower stands 120 feet (37 m) over the village of Cato, to the northeast of the village center. The light blue structure had been a landmark for 75 years or more but was to be torn down as of June 2012. The new water tower was to be dark blue on top and still say "Cato" on both sides. It will sit on 82 feet (25 m) of concrete. It will also be bigger, holding 25,000 extra gallons of water, in anticipation of future town growth.

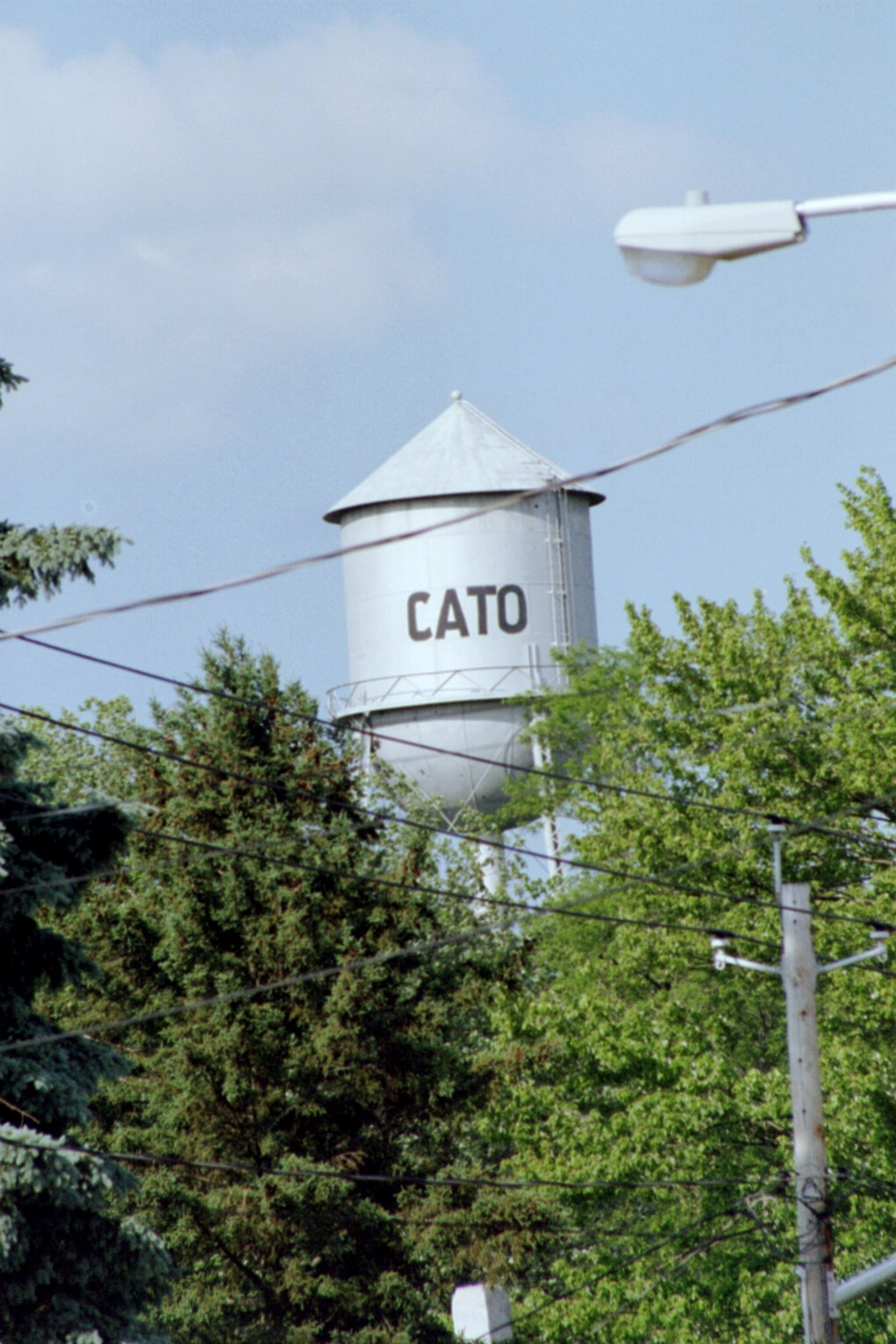
Old Cato water tower Summer 2012

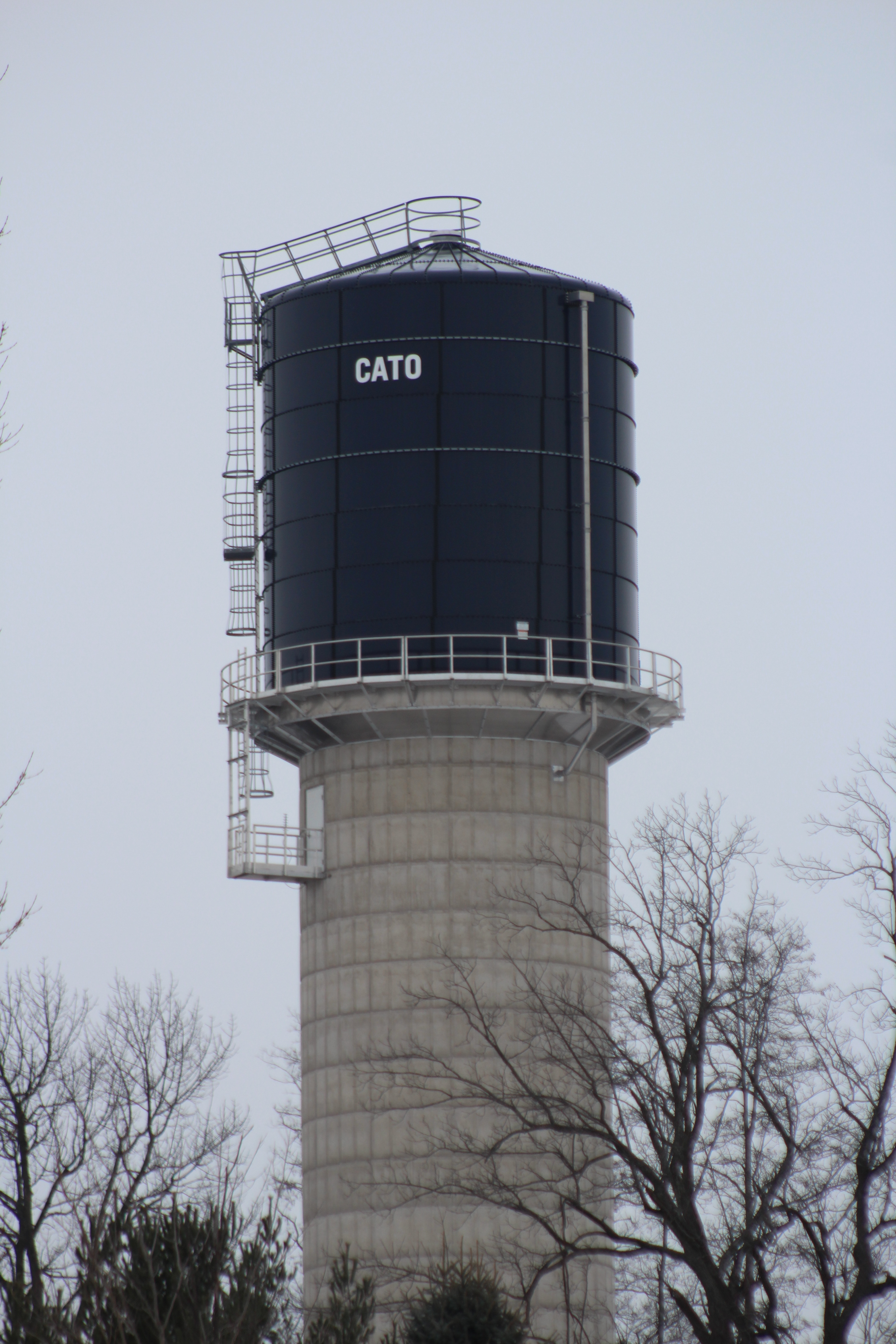
New Water Tower Winter 2017

== Demographics ==
Historical population
Census	Pop.	Note	%±
1880	313		—
1900	350		—
1910	374		6.9%
1920	404		8.0%
1930	403		−0.2%
1940	412		2.2%
1950	431		4.6%
1960	476		10.4%
1970	601		26.3%
1980	475		−21.0%
1990	581		22.3%
2000	601		3.4%
2010	532		−11.5%
2020	517		−2.8%
U.S. Decennial Census

As of the census of 2000, there were 601 people, 238 households, and 154 families residing in the village. The population density was 608.2 inhabitants per square mile (234.8/km^{2}). There were 253 housing units at an average density of 256.0 per square mile (98.8/km^{2}). The racial makeup of the village was 97.50% White, 0.33% Black or African American, 0.50% Native American, 0.33% from other races, and 1.33% from two or more races. Hispanic or Latino of any race were 0.50% of the population.

There were 238 households, out of which 35.3% had children under the age of 18 living with them, 51.3% were married couples living together, 11.3% had a female householder with no husband present, and 34.9% were non-families. 31.5% of all households were made up of individuals, and 19.7% had someone living alone who was 65 years of age or older. The average household size was 2.53 and the average family size was 3.15.

In the village, the population was spread out, with 29.5% under the age of 18, 6.3% from 18 to 24, 27.8% from 25 to 44, 19.3% from 45 to 64, and 17.1% who were 65 years of age or older. The median age was 38 years. For every 100 females, there were 87.8 males. For every 100 females age 18 and over, there were 80.4 males.

The median income for a household in the village was $35,938, and the median income for a family was $49,219. Males had a median income of $37,303 versus $26,250 for females. The per capita income for the village was $17,511. About 2.9% of families and 6.9% of the population were below the poverty line, including 5.5% of those under age 18 and 21.0% of those age 65 or over.

== Education ==
It is in the Cato-Meridian Central School District.
