= Hannibal Central School District =

School district in New York, United States

Location
- Hannibal, New York; United States

District information
- Type: Public

Students and staff
- District mascot: Warrior (Carthaginian Soldier)
- Colors: Purple and White

Other information
- Website: www.hannibalcsd.org

Hannibal Central School District serves the town of Hannibal, Oswego County, New York and includes:

- Hannibal High School
- (Dennis M.) Kenney Middle School
- Fairley Elementary School

As of 2011, the district had a total enrollment of 1,514.

== Athletics ==
Hannibal competes in the American division of the OHSL Liberty League, and Section III of the New York State Public High School Athletic Association (NYSPHSAA). All athletics are in Class B except for Cross Country being placed in Class C. Hannibal has many accomplishments throughout its sports programs including League and Section championships and New York State Scholar Athletes.

=== Cross Country ===
The Warriors are coached by Dan "P Dawg” Pawlewicz, who has built a powerhouse program.

- Section Champions: 1972, 2012
- 2012 3rd Place NYSPHSAA Class C
- League Champions: 1972, 2012, 2015
- 2011 McQuaid Invitational Champions

==== 2012 Section Champions Roster ====
- Ryan Perry, Kyle Cooper, Ben "Speed Lightning" Slate, Erick Xavier Febus, Jason "McQuaid" McFarland, Frank "The Tank" Lackey, Zane-O Pointon, Blake "The Snake" Farnham, Ben Raymond

==== Individual Accomplishments ====
- Jason "McQuaid" McFarland
  - 2014 & 2015 Section 3 Class C Champion
  - 2015 - 4th in NYSPHSAA Class C
  - 2015 - 25th NYS Federation meet
  - 2014 - 11th in NYSPHSAA Class C
  - 2013 - 33rd in NYSPHSAA Class C
  - 2012 a part of the 3rd place NYSPHSAA Class C team and Section 3 Class C Champions
  - 2014 & 2015 All CNY Team
  - Competed at the NYSPHSAA meet all 4 years of his career
  - OHSL League Champion 2014 & 2015
  - JV McQuaid winner in 2012
  - Freshman Speed Rating Record 151
  - School Speed Rating Record 181
  - Final Ranking of 2nd in NYS Class C
- Ryan Perry
  - 2012 Section 3 Class C Champion
  - 2nd place 2012 OHSL Championship
  - 2012 All CNY Team
- Ben Griffin
  - 3rd Section 3 Class C
  - 8th NYSPHSAA Class C
- Ben Slate
  - 8th place Section 3 Class C
  - 3rd OHSL Championship
- Zane Pointon
  - 2013 1st place Section 3 Class B Steeplechase

=== Football ===
In 2005 and 2006 Hannibal's high school football team advanced to the Dome where the Syracuse Orange play. Both seasons ended with a 9 -1 record.

=== Indoor Track & Field ===
Coached by Dan Pawlewicz and Dom Pike

=== Outdoor Track & Field ===
Coached by Dom Pike

=== Baseball ===
==== Athletes to turn Pro ====
- Josh Shortslef Drafted 179th overall in the 6th round to the Pittsburgh Pirates in 2000
- Jake Shortslef Drafted Round 26 to the Texas Rangers in 2015 after playing for Herkimer Community College

Jake Shortslef hold the Section III record for most strikeouts in a game with 20. The 20 strikeouts was a Hannibal record and tied a Section III record held by West Genesee's Kevin Krause in 1991 and by Mexico's Jeff Hains in 2006.
