= Meridian, New York =

- Village
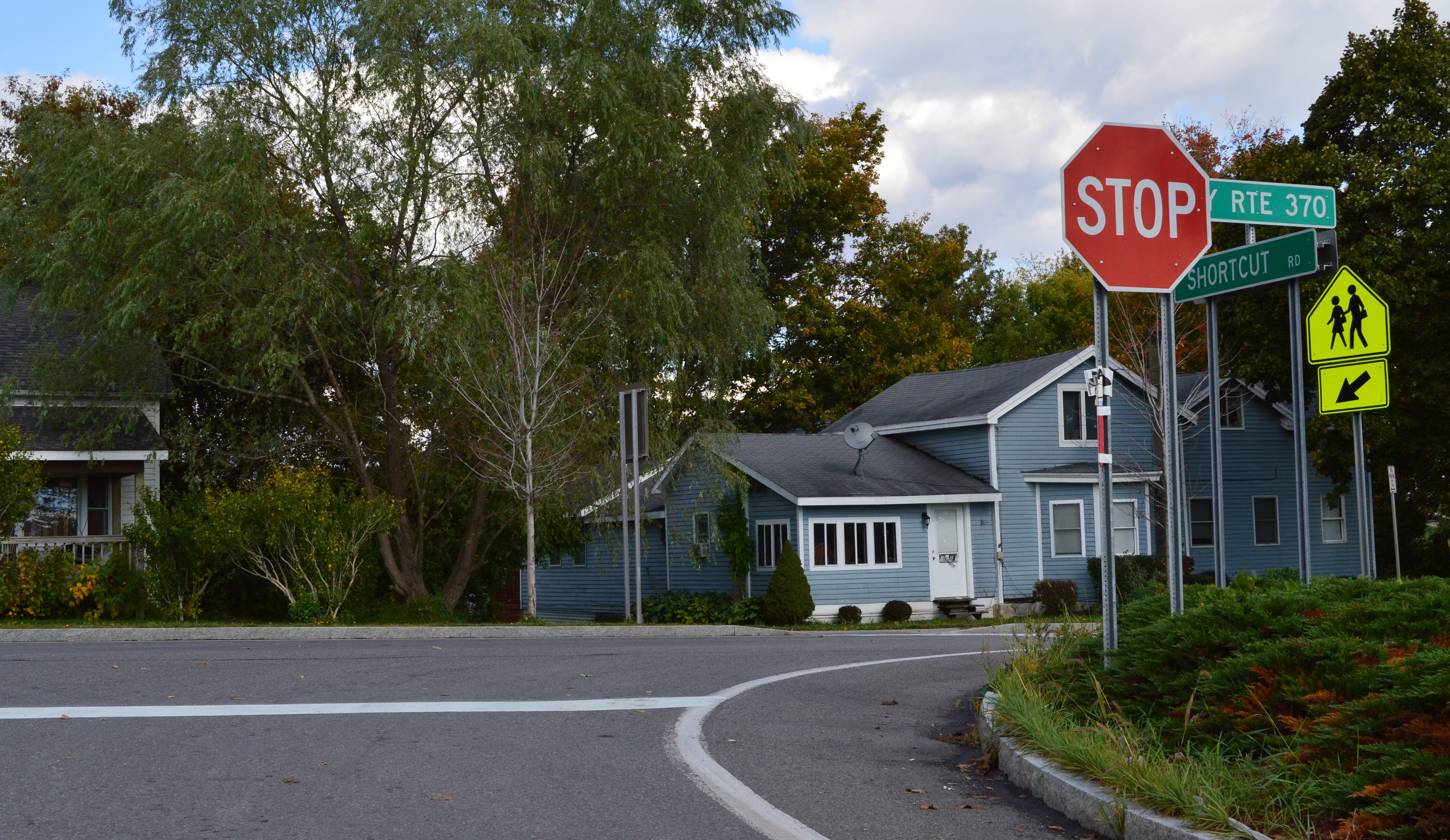

- Location within New York Location within the United States
- Coordinates: 43°9′49″N 76°32′6″W
- Country: United States
- State: New York
- County: Cayuga
- Town: Cato

Area
  - Total: 0.69 sq mi (1.79 km^{2})
  - Land: 0.69 sq mi (1.79 km^{2})
  - Water: 0 sq mi (0.00 km^{2})
- Elevation: 453 ft (138 m)

Population (2020)
  - Total: 287
  - Density: 415.5/sq mi (160.42/km^{2})
- Time zone: UTC-5 (Eastern (EST))
  - Summer (DST): UTC-4 (EDT)
- ZIP Codes: 13113 (Meridian); 13033 (Cato)
- Area code: 315
- FIPS code: 36-46646
- GNIS feature ID: 0956983

Meridian is a village in Cayuga County, New York, United States. As of the 2020 census, Meridian had a population of 287. Meridian is near the northern town line of the town of Cato and is west of Syracuse.

== History ==
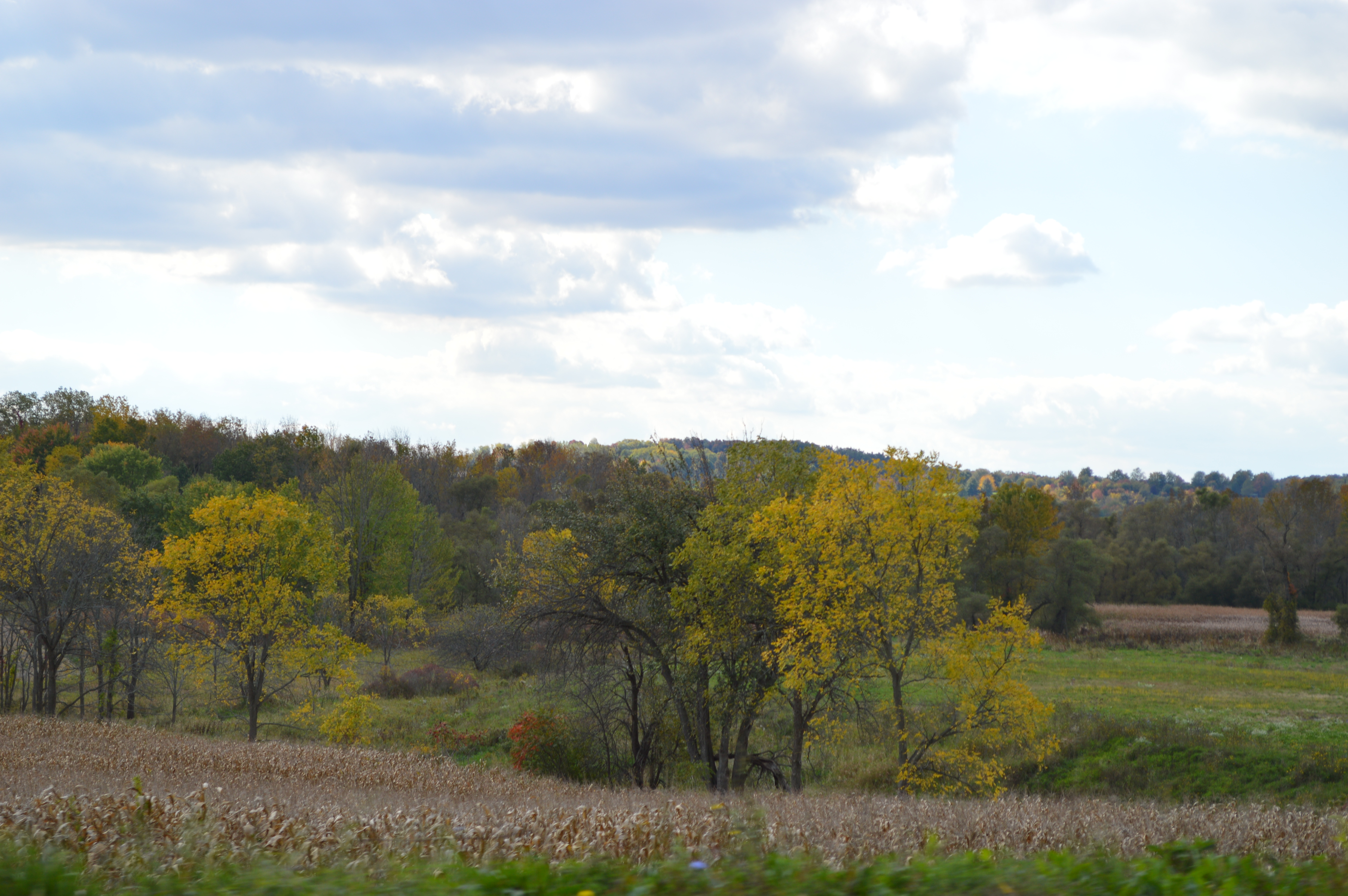

The community was settled in 1804. It was once called "Cato Four Corners". Meridian was incorporated as a village in 1854.

The Meridian Baptist Church, at the eastern edge of the village, was founded in 1810. The church celebrated the 200th anniversary of its founding for a full year in 2010. The anniversary observance ended in October.

A number of historical homes and other buildings featuring Neoclassical architectural styling, in varying conditions of preservation, can be found throughout the village. The William Smith Ingham House, one of such, is listed in the National Register of Historic Places.

== Notable person ==
Theodore Ruggles Timby, inventor of the revolving turret used on the USS Monitor during the Civil War, lived in Meridian from at least 1839 until he left in the fall of 1855. Prior to his leaving the village, his fraudulent behavior while serving as Secretary and agent of the Tempest Insurance Company of Meridian caused significant financial losses to the company. He left town heavily in debt. His residence still stands on the west side of Bonta Bridge Road, south of the center of the village.

== Geography ==
Meridian is located at 43°9′49″N 76°32′6″W (43.163531, -76.535045).

According to the United States Census Bureau, the village has a total area of 0.69 square miles (1.8 km^{2}), all land.

New York State Route 370 passes through the village.

== Demographics ==
Historical population
Census	Pop.	Note	%±
1870	249		—
1900	335		—
1910	326		−2.7%
1920	274		−16.0%
1930	264		−3.6%
1940	307		16.3%
1950	354		15.3%
1960	379		7.1%
1970	369		−2.6%
1980	344		−6.8%
1990	351		2.0%
2000	350		−0.3%
2010	309		−11.7%
2020	287		−7.1%
U.S. Decennial Census

As of the census of 2000, there were 350 people, 118 households, and 90 families residing in the village. The population density was 505.8 inhabitants per square mile (195.3/km^{2}). There were 120 housing units at an average density of 173.4 per square mile (67.0/km^{2}). The racial makeup of the village was 97.43% White, 0.57% Native American, and 2.00% from two or more races. Hispanic or Latino of any race were 1.14% of the population.

There were 118 households, out of which 38.1% had children under the age of 18 living with them, 61.0% were married couples living together, 10.2% had a female householder with no husband present, and 22.9% were non-families. 17.8% of all households were made up of individuals, and 6.8% had someone living alone who was 65 years of age or older. The average household size was 2.97 and the average family size was 3.34.

In the village, the population was spread out, with 31.4% under the age of 18, 8.0% from 18 to 24, 29.1% from 25 to 44, 19.1% from 45 to 64, and 12.3% who were 65 years of age or older. The median age was 34 years. For every 100 females, there were 105.9 males. For every 100 females age 18 and over, there were 96.7 males.

The median income for a household in the village was $41,250, and the median income for a family was $48,250. Males had a median income of $35,313 versus $25,125 for females. The per capita income for the village was $15,567. About 5.5% of families and 9.4% of the population were below the poverty line, including 10.5% of those under age 18 and 5.7% of those age 65 or over.

== Education ==
It is in the Cato-Meridian Central School District.
