= Cayuga County, New York =

County in New York, United States

- County
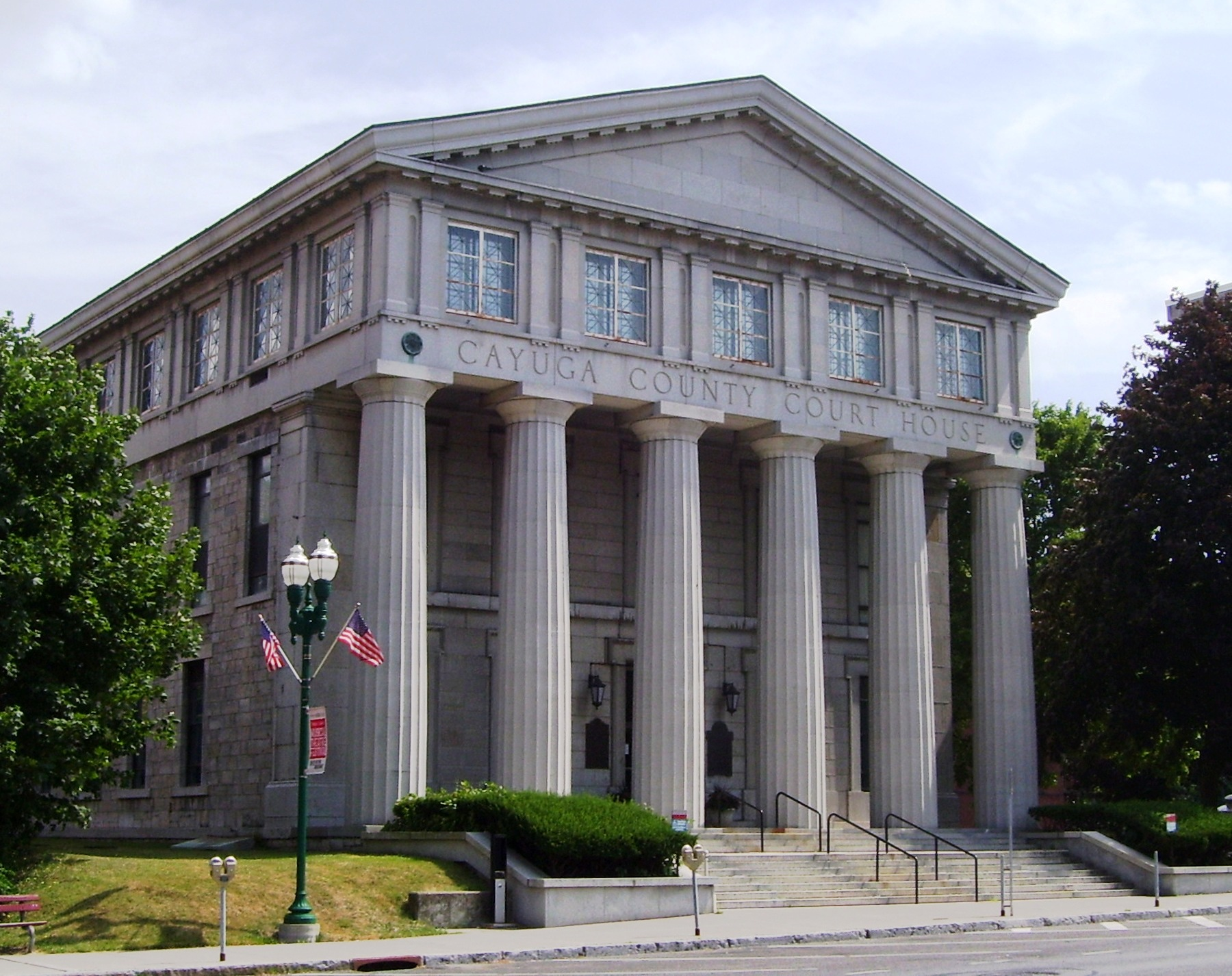
- Cayuga County Courthouse

- Seal

- Location within the U.S. state of New York
- Coordinates: 43°00′N 76°34′W
- Country: United States
- State: New York
- Founded: 1799
- Named for: Cayuga people
- Seat: Auburn
- Largest city: Auburn

Area
  - Total: 864 sq mi (2,240 km^{2})
  - Land: 692 sq mi (1,790 km^{2})
  - Water: 172 sq mi (450 km^{2}) 20%

Population (2020)
  - Total: 76,248
  - Estimate (2025): 74,365 ▼
  - Density: 110/sq mi (42.5/km^{2})
- Time zone: UTC−5 (Eastern)
  - Summer (DST): UTC−4 (EDT)
- Congressional districts: 22nd, 24th
- Website: www.cayugacounty.gov

Cayuga County is a county in the U.S. state of New York. As of the 2020 census, the population was 76,248. Its county seat and largest city is Auburn. The county was named for the Cayuga people, one of the Native American tribes in the Iroquois Confederation. The county is part of the Central New York region of the state.

Cayuga County comprises the Auburn, NY Micropolitan Statistical Area, which is also included in the Syracuse-Auburn, NY Combined Statistical Area.

== History ==
When counties were established in the Province of New York in 1683, the present Cayuga County was part of Albany County. This was an enormous county, including the northern part of the present state of New York and all of the present state of Vermont and, in theory, extending westward to the Pacific Ocean. This county was reduced in size on July 3, 1766, by the creation of Cumberland County, and further on March 16, 1770, by the creation of Gloucester County, both containing territory now in Vermont.

On March 12, 1772, what was left of Albany County was split into three parts, one remaining under the name Albany County. One of the other pieces, Tryon County, contained the western portion (and thus, since no western boundary was specified, theoretically still extended west to the Pacific). The eastern boundary of Tryon County was approximately five miles west of the present city of Schenectady, and the county included the western part of the Adirondack Mountains and the area west of the West Branch of the Delaware River. The area then designated as Tryon County now includes 37 counties of New York State. The county was named for William Tryon, colonial governor of New York. In the years prior to 1776, most of the Loyalists in Tryon County fled to Canada.

In 1784, following the peace treaty that ended the American Revolutionary War, the name of Tryon County was changed to Montgomery County in honor of the general, Richard Montgomery, who had captured several places in Canada and died attempting to capture the city of Quebec, replacing the name of the hated British governor.

In 1789, Montgomery County was reduced in size by the splitting off of Ontario County. The actual area split off from Montgomery County was much larger than the present county, also including the present Allegany, Cattaraugus, Chautauqua, Erie, Genesee, Livingston, Monroe, Niagara, Orleans, Steuben, Wyoming, Yates, and part of Schuyler and Wayne Counties.

Herkimer County was one of three counties split off from Montgomery County (the others being Otsego and Tioga Counties) in 1791.

Onondaga County was formed in 1794 by the splitting of Herkimer County.

Cayuga County was formed in 1799 by the splitting of Onondaga County. This county was, however, much larger than the present Cayuga County. It then included the present Seneca and Tompkins Counties.

In 1804, Seneca County was formed by the splitting of Cayuga County. Then in 1817, in turn, a portion of Seneca County was combined with a piece of the remainder of Cayuga County to form Tompkins County.

In the late 19th and early 20th century, this region attracted European immigrants who developed farms or took over existing ones, particularly from Italy and Poland.

== Geography ==
According to the U.S. Census Bureau, the county has a total area of 864 square miles (2,240 km^{2}), of which 692 square miles (1,790 km^{2}) is land and 172 square miles (450 km^{2}) (20%) is water.

Cayuga County is located in the west central part of the state, in the Finger Lakes region. Owasco Lake is in the center of the county, and Cayuga Lake forms part of the western boundary. Lake Ontario is on the northern border, and Skaneateles Lake and Cross Lake form part of the eastern border. Cayuga County has more waterfront land than any other county in the state not adjacent to the Atlantic Ocean.

=== Adjacent counties ===
- Oswego County – northeast
- Onondaga County – east
- Cortland County – southeast
- Tompkins County – south
- Seneca County – west
- Wayne County – west
- Prince Edward County, Ontario – north

=== Major highways ===
- Interstate 90 (New York State Thruway)
- U.S. Route 20
- New York State Route 3
- New York State Route 5
- New York State Route 31
- New York State Route 34
- New York State Route 38
- New York State Route 90
- New York State Route 104

=== National protected areas ===
- Lake Ontario National Marine Sanctuary (part)
- Montezuma National Wildlife Refuge (part)

== Demographics ==
Historical population
Census	Pop.	Note	%±
1800	15,871		—
1810	29,843		88.0%
1820	38,897		30.3%
1830	47,948		23.3%
1840	50,338		5.0%
1850	55,458		10.2%
1860	55,767		0.6%
1870	59,550		6.8%
1880	65,081		9.3%
1890	65,302		0.3%
1900	66,234		1.4%
1910	67,106		1.3%
1920	65,221		−2.8%
1930	64,751		−0.7%
1940	65,508		1.2%
1950	70,136		7.1%
1960	73,942		5.4%
1970	77,439		4.7%
1980	79,894		3.2%
1990	82,313		3.0%
2000	81,963		−0.4%
2010	80,026		−2.4%
2020	76,248		−4.7%
2025 (est.)	74,365	▼	−2.5%
U.S. Decennial Census; 1790–1960 1900–1990; 1990–2000 2010–2020

=== 2020 census ===
Cayuga County, New York – Racial and ethnic composition Note: the US Census treats Hispanic/Latino as an ethnic category. This table excludes Latinos from the racial categories and assigns them to a separate category. Hispanics/Latinos may be of any race.
Race / Ethnicity (NH = Non-Hispanic)	Pop 1980	Pop 1990	Pop 2000	Pop 2010	Pop 2020	% 1980	% 1990	% 2000	% 2010	% 2020
White alone (NH)	76,852	77,719	75,762	73,098	66,313	96.19%	94.42%	92.43%	91.34%	86.97%
Black or African American alone (NH)	1,911	2,774	3,166	3,009	2,727	2.39%	3.37%	3.86%	3.76%	3.58%
Native American or Alaska Native alone (NH)	147	259	243	252	224	0.18%	0.31%	0.30%	0.31%	0.29%
Asian alone (NH)	185	319	346	387	379	0.23%	0.39%	0.42%	0.48%	0.50%
Native Hawaiian or Pacific Islander alone (NH)	x	x	17	26	54	x	x	0.02%	0.03%	0.07%
Other race alone (NH)	166	40	70	112	253	0.21%	0.05%	0.09%	0.14%	0.33%
Mixed race or Multiracial (NH)	x	x	748	1,246	3,662	x	x	0.91%	1.56%	4.80%
Hispanic or Latino (any race)	633	1,202	1,611	1,896	2,636	0.79%	1.46%	1.97%	2.37%	3.46%
Total	79,894	82,313	81,963	80,026	76,248	100.00%	100.00%	100.00%	100.00%	100.00%

=== 2000 Census ===
As of the census of 2000, there were 81,963 people, 30,558 households, and 20,840 families residing in the county. The population density was 118 people per square mile (46 people/km^{2}). There were 35,477 housing units at an average density of 51 per square mile (20/km^{2}). The racial makeup of the county was 93.34% White, 3.99% Black or African American, 0.31% Native American, 0.42% Asian, 0.02% Pacific Islander, 0.88% from other races, and 1.03% from two or more races. 1.97% of the population were Hispanic or Latino of any race. 16.3% were of Irish, 16.0% English, 15.7% Italian, 11.3% German, 9.5% American and 6.3% Polish ancestry according to Census 2000. 94.9% spoke English, 2.0% Spanish and 1.0% Italian as their first language.

There were 30,558 households, out of which 32.60% had children under the age of 18 living with them, 52.00% were married couples living together, 11.00% had a female householder with no husband present, and 31.80% were non-families. 26.20% of all households were made up of individuals, and 11.90% had someone living alone who was 65 years of age or older. The average household size was 2.53 and the average family size was 3.04.

In the county, the population was spread out, with 25.10% under the age of 18, 8.20% from 18 to 24, 29.70% from 25 to 44, 22.60% from 45 to 64, and 14.40% who were 65 years of age or older. The median age was 37 years. For every 100 females there were 102.20 males. For every 100 females age 18 and over, there were 101.80 males.

The median income for a household in the county was $37,487, and the median income for a family was $44,973. Males had a median income of $33,356 versus $23,919 for females. The per capita income for the county was $18,003. About 7.80% of families and 11.10% of the population were below the poverty line, including 14.90% of those under age 18 and 8.20% of those age 65 or over.

At 2.3%, Cayuga County has the highest share of Ukrainian Americans of any county in New York State. The Ukrainian-American population in Cayuga County is heavily concentrated in the Auburn area.

== Government and politics ==
United States presidential election results for Cayuga County, New York
Year	Republican / Whig		Democratic		Third party(ies)	
Year	No.	%	No.	%	No.	%
1836	3,724	46.50%	4,284	53.50%	0	0.00%
1840	5,172	51.17%	4,863	48.12%	72	0.71%
1844	4,908	46.81%	5,202	49.61%	376	3.59%
1848	4,318	45.99%	1,034	11.01%	4,037	43.00%
1852	4,838	46.91%	4,552	44.14%	923	8.95%
1856	7,035	65.28%	1,818	16.87%	1,923	17.85%
1860	7,922	66.71%	3,954	33.29%	0	0.00%
1864	7,534	63.09%	4,408	36.91%	0	0.00%
1868	8,261	62.86%	4,880	37.14%	0	0.00%
1872	7,994	62.35%	4,782	37.30%	46	0.36%
1876	8,967	58.91%	6,120	40.21%	134	0.88%
1880	9,372	58.90%	5,976	37.56%	564	3.54%
1884	9,205	56.62%	6,041	37.16%	1,012	6.22%
1888	9,646	57.78%	6,380	38.22%	668	4.00%
1892	8,341	53.95%	5,999	38.80%	1,121	7.25%
1896	10,024	61.38%	5,846	35.80%	460	2.82%
1900	10,328	59.99%	6,330	36.77%	559	3.25%
1904	10,708	62.88%	5,707	33.52%	613	3.60%
1908	9,699	58.34%	5,789	34.82%	1,136	6.83%
1912	5,788	42.01%	4,691	34.05%	3,298	23.94%
1916	7,831	53.31%	6,391	43.51%	467	3.18%
1920	15,234	67.68%	6,343	28.18%	933	4.14%
1924	17,252	63.66%	7,369	27.19%	2,479	9.15%
1928	20,202	62.11%	11,787	36.24%	536	1.65%
1932	17,280	55.66%	12,989	41.84%	774	2.49%
1936	20,203	60.85%	12,158	36.62%	839	2.53%
1940	21,032	59.80%	13,985	39.76%	156	0.44%
1944	18,680	57.25%	13,849	42.44%	100	0.31%
1948	19,017	56.35%	14,317	42.42%	413	1.22%
1952	25,037	68.08%	11,695	31.80%	46	0.13%
1956	26,503	72.08%	10,268	27.92%	0	0.00%
1960	20,437	54.18%	17,257	45.75%	28	0.07%
1964	11,453	32.20%	24,090	67.73%	23	0.06%
1968	16,167	49.49%	14,604	44.71%	1,895	5.80%
1972	22,774	67.08%	11,097	32.68%	81	0.24%
1976	19,775	59.31%	13,348	40.03%	220	0.66%
1980	17,945	54.78%	11,708	35.74%	3,103	9.47%
1984	21,451	63.50%	12,207	36.14%	121	0.36%
1988	16,934	52.45%	15,044	46.60%	307	0.95%
1992	12,065	33.82%	13,088	36.69%	10,518	29.49%
1996	11,093	34.78%	15,879	49.79%	4,922	15.43%
2000	14,988	44.11%	17,031	50.12%	1,959	5.77%
2004	17,743	49.22%	17,534	48.64%	775	2.15%
2008	15,243	44.80%	18,128	53.28%	651	1.91%
2012	13,454	43.18%	17,007	54.58%	700	2.25%
2016	17,384	52.41%	13,522	40.76%	2,266	6.83%
2020	19,632	53.33%	16,359	44.44%	818	2.22%
2024	20,482	56.09%	15,772	43.19%	263	0.72%

Cayuga County is considered a swing county in national elections. In 2000, Democrat Al Gore won Cayuga County with 50% of the vote to George W. Bush's 44%. In 2004, however, incumbent President Bush defeated John Kerry by a narrow margin of only 0.58%, or 49.22% to 48.64%. In 2008, it was won by Democrat Barack Obama, with 53% of the vote to Republican John McCain's 45%. In 2012, Obama won the county again by a slightly larger margin over Republican Mitt Romney.

However, like most of upstate New York, Cayuga County swung right in 2016. Republican Donald Trump carried it with 52.41% of the vote to Hillary Clinton's 40.76%, the largest Republican vote share since 1988 and the largest margin of victory for a Republican since 1984. In 2020, Trump carried the county again, this time taking 53.49% of the vote (the largest vote share for any Republican since 1984) to Joe Biden's 44.27%. Biden became the first Democrat to win the presidency without carrying Cayuga County since Jimmy Carter in 1976. In 2024 this trend continued, with Donald Trump winning the highest percentage of the vote for any candidate of either party since Reagan in 1984.

In statewide elections it has gone for Democrats: both Eliot Spitzer and Hillary Clinton won it in 2006 with more than 60% of the vote. In 2010, Democrat Andrew Cuomo defeated Republican Carl Paladino 53% to 40% for the governorship, with 3% going to Green Party candidate Howie Hawkins. Also in 2010, both Democratic U.S. Senators, Kirsten Gillibrand and Chuck Schumer, carried Cayuga County. Gillibrand won 54% of the vote, while Schumer won 61%.

The Cayuga County Legislature consists of 15 members, each of whom are elected from single-member districts.

Voter registration as of February 21, 2022
Party	Active voters	Inactive voters	Total voters	Percentage
Republican	17,415	822	18,237	36.46%
Democratic	14,809	733	15,542	31.07%
Unaffiliated	11,479	745	12,224	24.44%
Other (Note: Included are voters affiliated with the Conservative Party, Green Party, Working Families Party, Independence Party, Women's Equality Party, Reform Party, and other small parties.)	3,753	259	4,012	8.02%
Total	47,456	2,559	50,015	100%

== Communities ==
A map of the towns and villages in Cayuga County

=== Larger Settlements ===
#	Location	Population	Type	Sector
1	†Auburn	27,687	City	Center
2	Melrose Park	2,294	CDP	Center
3	Weedsport	1,815	Village	North
4	Port Byron	1,290	Village	North
5	Moravia	1,282	Village	South
6	Union Springs	1,197	Village	Center
7	Aurora	724	Village	South
7	Fair Haven	724	Village	North
9	Cayuga	549	Village	Center
10	Cato	532	Village	North
11	Meridian	309	Village	North

† - County Seat

=== Towns ===
- Aurelius
- Brutus
- Cato
- Conquest
- Fleming
- Genoa
- Ira
- Ledyard
- Locke
- Mentz
- Montezuma
- Moravia
- Niles
- Owasco
- Scipio
- Sempronius
- Sennett
- Springport
- Sterling
- Summerhill
- Throop
- Venice
- Victory

=== Hamlets ===
- Kelloggsville
- Sherwood
- Westbury

== Education ==
School districts include:

- Auburn City School District
- Cato-Meridian Central School District
- Groton Central School District
- Hannibal Central School District
- Homer Central School District
- Jordan-Elbridge Central School District
- Moravia Central School District
- Oswego City School District
- Port Byron Central School District
- Red Creek Central School District
- Skaneateles Central School District
- Southern Cayuga Central School District
- Union Springs Central School District
- Weedsport Central School District

== Notable people ==
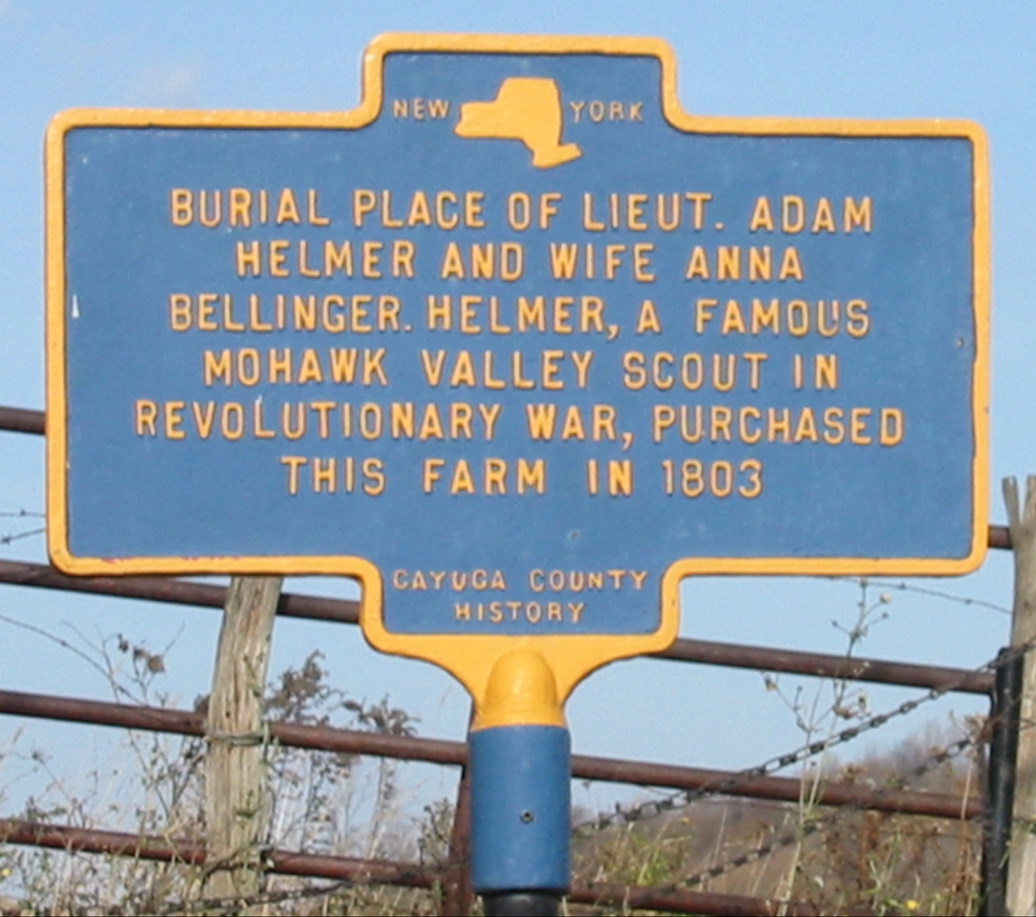
Marker at the burial site of Helmer and his wife on the north side of Cottle Road in the Town of Brutus, New York. Their grave stones were moved to the Weedsport Rural Cemetery.

- Millard Fillmore was born here.
- Charles Bogardus (1841–1929), politician and businessman
- William H. Carpenter (1821–1885), United States Consul to Fuzhou during the American Civil War
- Adam Helmer, (c. 1754–1830), American Revolutionary War hero
- William H. Seward (1801–1872), United States Secretary of State and Governor of New York
- Harriet Tubman (1822–1913), abolitionist and social activist
- Harold Wethey (1902–1984), art historian and professor of art history at the University of Michigan

== See also ==
- Cayuga Community College
- Cayuga County Sheriff's Office
- List of counties in New York
- National Register of Historic Places listings in Cayuga County, New York
- USS Cayuga County (LST-529)
