= New York State Route 38A =

New York state highway

New York State Route 38A
- Map of the Finger Lakes region with NY 38A highlighted in red

Route information
- Auxiliary route of NY 38
- Maintained by NYSDOT and the city of Auburn
- Length: 21.91 mi (35.26 km)
- Existed: 1930–present

Major junctions
- South end: NY 38 in Moravia
- North end: US 20 / NY 5 in Auburn

Location
- Country: United States
- State: New York
- Counties: Onondaga, Cayuga

Highway system
- New York Highways; Interstate; US; State; Reference; Parkways
| ← NY 38 | → NY 38B |

New York State Route 38A (NY 38A) is a north–south state highway located within Onondaga and Cayuga counties in central New York in the United States. The southern terminus of the route is at an intersection with NY 38 in the village of Moravia. Its northern terminus is at a junction with U.S. Route 20 (US 20) and NY 5 in downtown Auburn. Much of NY 38A runs through rural, undeveloped areas situated between Owasco Lake and Skaneateles Lake.

The southern half of NY 38A was originally designated as part of NY 26 in 1924. In the 1930 renumbering of state highways in New York, NY 26 was broken up into several routes, including NY 38A, a new route assigned to NY 26's former alignment between Moravia and Skaneateles and a previously unnumbered highway from Skaneateles to Auburn.

== Route description ==
NY 38A begins at an intersection with NY 38 in the village of Moravia. It proceeds east out of the village on East Cayuga Street and follows it to the vicinity of St. Patrick's Cemetery, where NY 38A turns to follow Decker Creek northward through a valley surrounding the creek. While in the valley, NY 38A passes through mostly undeveloped areas of the towns of Moravia and Niles. At Globe Hotel Corners, an extremely small hamlet just north of the Niles town line, NY 38A begins to parallel NY 41A, which runs roughly 2 miles (3.2 km) to the east of NY 38A along the top of the valley.

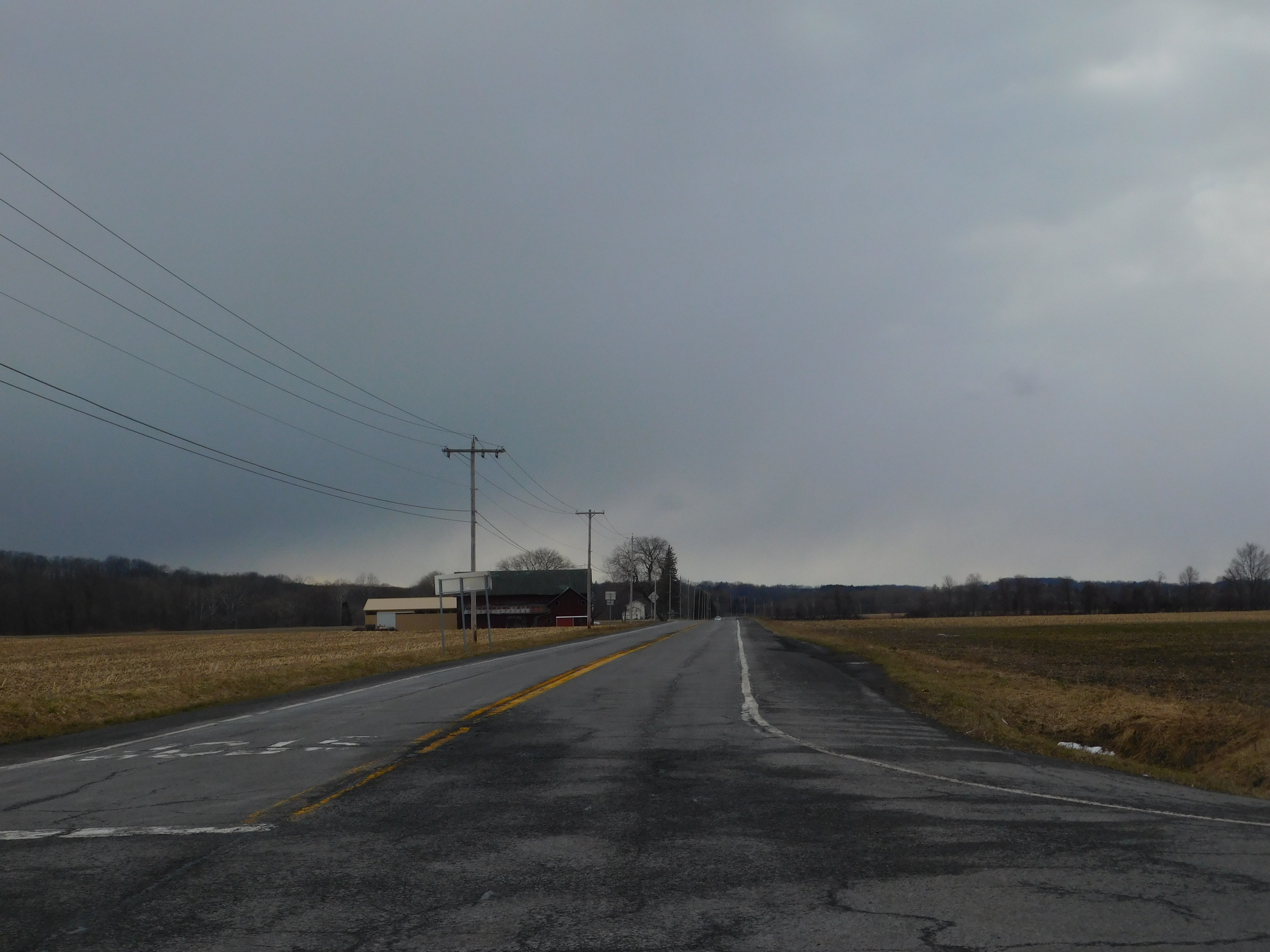
NY 38A north from the junction with NY 359 in Onondaga County

Approximately 2 miles (3.2 km) north of Globe Hotel Corners, NY 38A turns to follow a more northwesterly routing, matching the curvature of the river valley. The valley ends at the Cayuga–Onondaga County line, where NY 38A enters an area of flats situated in between Owasco Lake and Skaneateles Lake. Here, NY 38A intersects NY 359, a short highway leading to NY 41A. NY 38A bears west here, traveling to the south of the Dutch Hollow Country Club as it reenters Cayuga County.

The route proceeds west into the town of Owasco and the hamlet of the same name within, the first community of any significant size along the route since it left Moravia. It heads westward through the center of the community before reentering rural surroundings and coming within view of Owasco Lake. The route curves northward at the waterbody and follows the eastern shore of Owasco Lake toward Auburn. Southeast of Auburn, NY 38A crosses a small stream and serves the Lakeview Golf and Country Club and the Owasco Country Club as it curves westward around the northern end of the lake.

At Emerson Park, a public park situated near the midpoint of the northern lakeshore, the highway turns back to the north to access Melrose Park, a community built up just north of the lake around the Owasco Outlet. Here, NY 38A meets NY 437, a short connector highway linking NY 38A to its parent, NY 38. North of Melrose Park, the route becomes known as Owasco Street as it follows the Owasco Outlet into the city of Auburn. At the city line, ownership and maintenance of the route shifts from the New York State Department of Transportation (NYSDOT) to Auburn. The route heads northeastward through the densely populated city to Walnut Street, where it splits into a one-way couplet along Fulton Street (northbound) and John and Owasco Streets (southbound). One block to the north, NY 38A intersects US 20 at Genesee Street. US 20 joins NY 38A for one block to the Auburn Arterial (NY 5), where NY 38A comes to an end.

== History ==
When the first set of posted routes in New York were assigned in 1924, the segment of modern NY 38A between its southern terminus in Moravia and NY 359 in Skaneateles was designated as part of NY 26, a north–south highway extending from Ithaca to Syracuse. In the 1930 renumbering of state highways in New York, NY 26 was split into several routes. From Dryden to Moravia, NY 26 became part of NY 38. Between Moravia and modern NY 359, it became the southern half of the new NY 38A, an alternate route of NY 38 around the east side of Owasco Lake that continued from the current NY 359 junction to Auburn by way of a previously unnumbered roadway.

== Major intersections ==
| County | Location | mi | km | Destinations | Notes |
|---|---|---|---|---|---|
| Cayuga | Village of Moravia | 0.00 | 0.00 | NY 38 (West Cayuga Street / Main Street) | Southern terminus |
| Onondaga | Town of Skaneateles | 11.51 | 18.52 | NY 359 north – Skaneateles | Hamlet of Mandana; southern terminus of NY 359 |
| Cayuga | Town of Owasco | 19.63 | 31.59 | NY 437 west (White Bridge Road) to NY 38 | Eastern terminus of NY 437; hamlet of Melrose Park |
| Cayuga | Auburn | | | US 20 east (Genesee Street) – Skaneateles | Southern terminus of US 20 / NY 38A overlap |
| Cayuga | Auburn | 21.91 | 35.26 | US 20 west / NY 5 (Arterial) – Seneca Falls, Geneva | Northern terminus; northern terminus of US 20 / NY 38A overlap |
1.000 mi = 1.609 km; 1.000 km = 0.621 mi: Concurrency terminus
