= New York State Route 359 =

State highway in Onondaga County, New York, US

New York State Route 359
- Map of the Finger Lakes region with NY 359 highlighted in red

Route information
- Maintained by NYSDOT
- Length: 1.71 mi (2.75 km)
- Existed: early 1940s–present

Major junctions
- South end: NY 38A in Skaneateles
- North end: NY 41A in Skaneateles

Location
- Country: United States
- State: New York
- Counties: Onondaga

Highway system
- New York Highways; Interstate; US; State; Reference; Parkways
← NY 358	→ NY 360

New York State Route 359 (NY 359) is a state highway located entirely within the town of Skaneateles in Onondaga County, New York in the United States. At 1.71 miles (2.75 km) in length, it is one of the shortest signed state highways in all of New York. The route begins at NY 38A a half-mile (0.8 km) north of the Onondaga-Cayuga County county line and ends at NY 41A in the hamlet of Mandana. It lies between Skaneateles Lake and Owasco Lake. Excluding its termini, there are only two junctions with other roadways along the entire route. NY 359 was assigned in the early 1940s and was part of the original NY 26 from 1924 to 1930.

== Route description ==
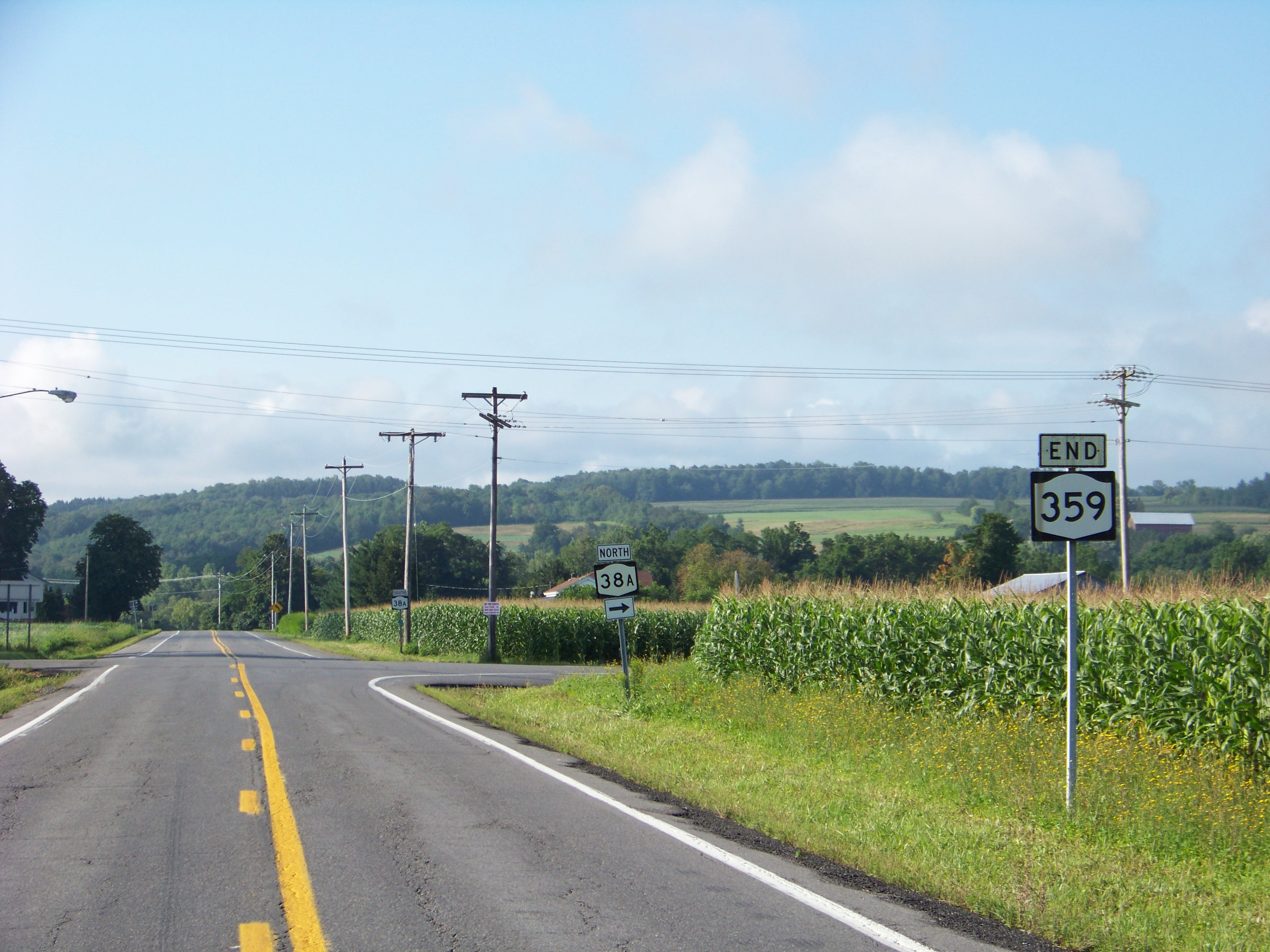
The southern terminus of NY 359 at NY 38A

NY 359 begins in the town of Skaneateles at an intersection with Heifer Street, a local road, and NY 38A. The route goes north, intersecting with Weeks Road 0.6 miles (1.0 km) north of NY 38A. Here, NY 359 begins to curve to the east with Weeks Road carrying on the northward alignment of NY 359. Upon meeting Lacy Road, the route takes over its east–west routing and heads east. NY 359 comes to an end just under a mile later at NY 41A in the lakeside hamlet of Mandana. East of NY 41A, the roadway continues for roughly 400 feet (120 m) to a boat launch on the western shore of Skaneateles Lake, 1.71 miles (2.75 km) from NY 38A.

Signed as a north–south route, it lies that way at the southern end, but about midway along its length the road turns and thence travels east–west. Excluding its termini, there are only two junctions with other roadways along the entire route. It is the only instance in New York of a route designated without an alphabetic suffix that terminates at both ends at suffixed routes.

== History ==
The origins of NY 359 date back to the assignment of the first state routes in New York in 1924. At this time, all of modern NY 359 became part of NY 26, a highway that continued north along what is now NY 41A toward the village of Skaneateles and south on modern NY 38A toward the village of Moravia. In the 1930 renumbering of state highways in New York, NY 26 was reassigned elsewhere in the state. Its former routing was incorporated into several new routes, including part of NY 38A from Moravia to the modern junction of NY 38A and NY 359 and part of NY 41A from Mandana to Skaneateles. The portion that is now NY 359, however, received no designation and became unnumbered. It was designated as NY 359 in the early 1940s.

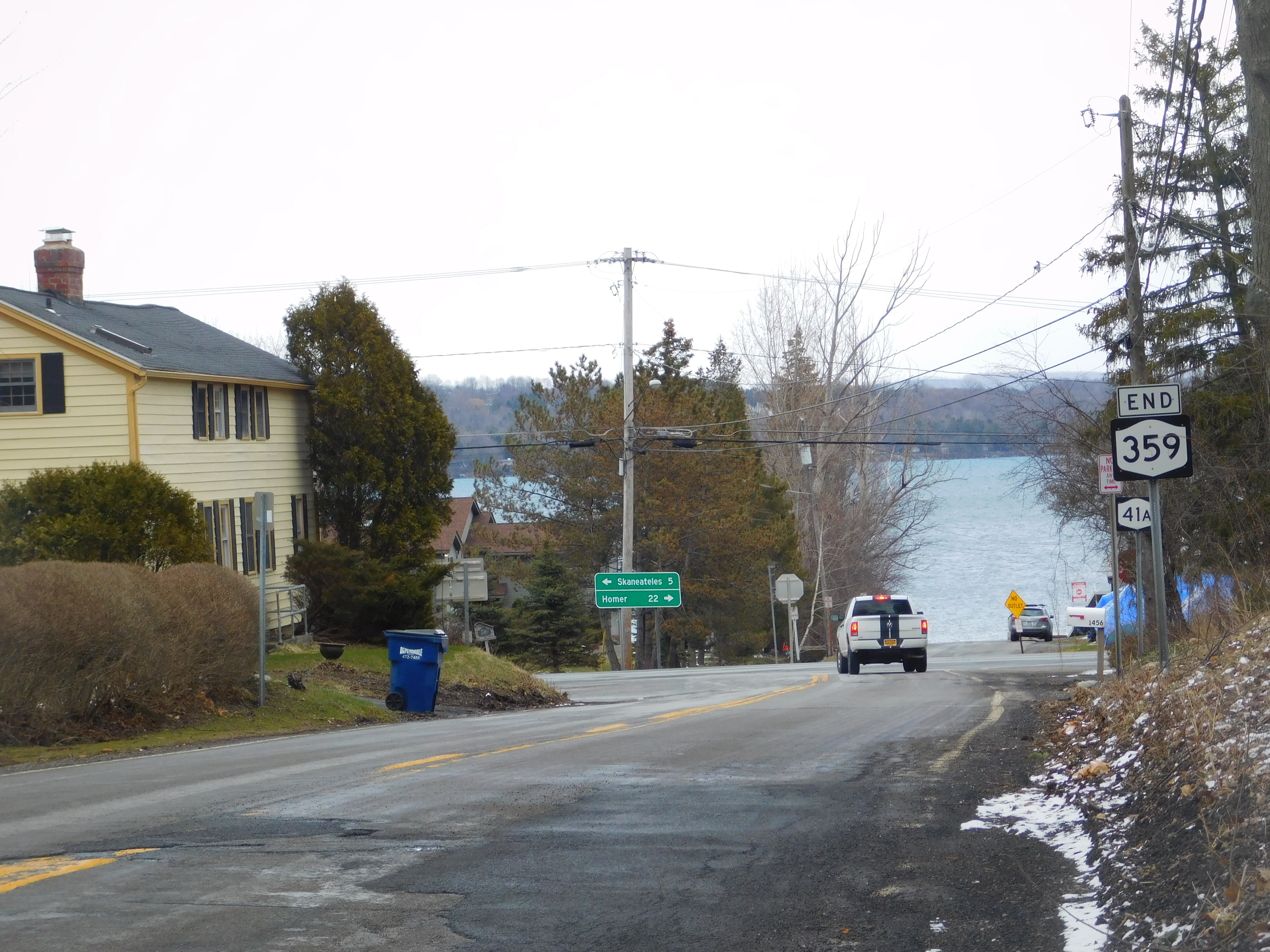
NY 359 approaching NY 41A in Mandana

== Major intersections ==
The entire route is in Skaneateles, Onondaga County.

mi	km	Destinations	Notes
0.00	0.00	NY 38A – Moravia, Auburn	Southern terminus
1.71	2.75	NY 41A – Skaneateles, Homer	Northern terminus; hamlet of Mandana
1.000 mi = 1.609 km; 1.000 km = 0.621 mi
