= New York State Route 437 =

State's shortest signed state highway

New York State Route 437
- White Bridge Road
- Map of Cayuga County in central New York with NY 437 highlighted in red

Route information
- Maintained by NYSDOT
- Length: 0.30 mi (480 m)
- Existed: January 1, 1970–present

Major junctions
- West end: NY 38 in Fleming
- East end: NY 38A in Owasco

Location
- Country: United States
- State: New York
- Counties: Cayuga

Highway system
- New York Highways; Interstate; US; State; Reference; Parkways
← NY 436	→ NY 438

New York State Route 437 (NY 437) is a state highway located south of Auburn in Cayuga County, New York, in the United States. At 0.30 miles (0.48 km) in length, it is the shortest signed state route in New York. It is a brief connector route between NY 38 and NY 38A known locally as White Bridge Road. The highway allows motorists, especially those wanting quick access to the opposite side of nearby Owasco Lake, to avoid having to cross the Owasco Outlet further downstream, in the city. NY 437 was assigned in 1970; however, the designation had appeared on maps of the area as early as two decades before.

== Route description ==
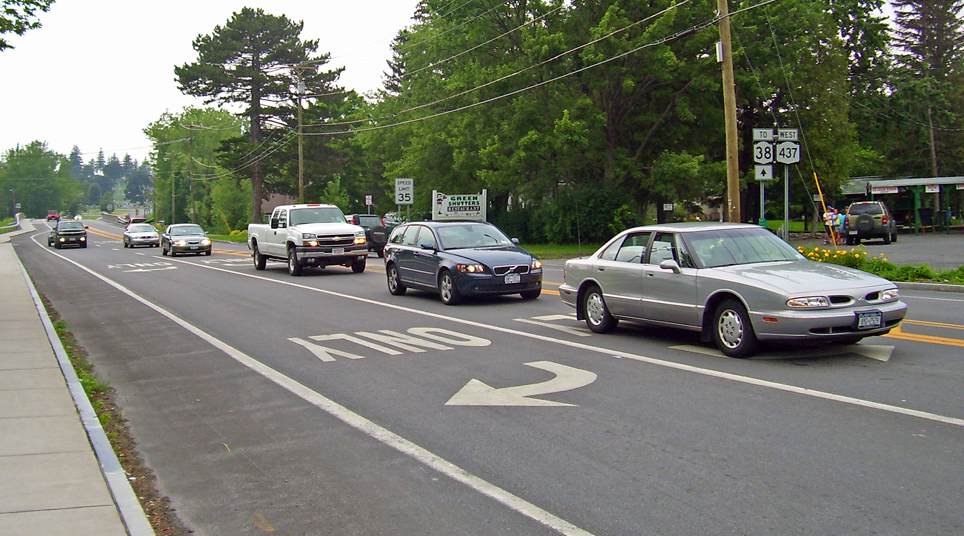
Looking toward the western terminus of NY 437 from the eastern terminus

NY 437 begins adjacent to St. Joseph Cemetery at a traffic circle with NY 38 in the town of Fleming, located south of the city of Auburn. It heads east as White Bridge Road, running along the north end of Owasco Lake. Roughly midway along its routing, NY 437 crosses the Owasco Outlet and passes into both Owasco and Emerson Park, a public park owned and maintained by Cayuga County. The route ends 200 yards (180 m) later at a T-intersection with NY 38A in an area of Owasco known as Melrose Park. NY 437 serves an undeveloped, forested area west of the outlet and a mostly residential area east of the waterway. The highway is just 0.30 miles (480 m) from end to end, making it the shortest signed state highway in New York.

== History ==
What is now NY 437 was originally improved to state highway standards in stages during the early 20th century. The portion from the modern traffic circle with NY 38 to the Owasco Lake outlet was rebuilt in 1908 as part of State Highway 384 (SH 384), while the section between the outlet and current NY 38A was reconstructed from 1912 to 1913 as part of SH 752. Both numbers are internal, legislative designations and are thus unsigned. NY 437 was marked on contemporary maps of the area as a designation for the short east–west state highway as early as 1947; however, the designation was not officially assigned by the New York State Department of Transportation (NYSDOT) until January 1, 1970.

== Major intersections ==
The entire route is in Cayuga County.

Location	mi	km	Destinations	Notes
Fleming	0.00	0.00	NY 38	Western terminus; traffic circle
Owasco	0.30	0.48	NY 38A	Census-designated place of Melrose Park; eastern terminus
1.000 mi = 1.609 km; 1.000 km = 0.621 mi

== See also ==
- New York State Route 419
