= Sempronius, New York =

- Town
- Location within Cayuga County and New York

- Location within New York Location within the United States
- Coordinates: 42°43′37″N 76°19′54″W
- Country: United States
- State: New York
- County: Cayuga

Government
  - Type: Town Council
  - Town Supervisor: Kevin J. Court (R)
  - Town Council: Members' List: • Joanne Andersen (R); • George Glover (R); • Herrick C. Kimball (R); • John Bell (R)

Area
  - Total: 29.72 sq mi (76.97 km^{2})
  - Land: 29.34 sq mi (75.99 km^{2})
  - Water: 0.38 sq mi (0.98 km^{2})
- Elevation: 1,736 ft (529 m)

Population (2020)
  - Total: 840
  - Density: 28.6/sq mi (11.05/km^{2})
- Time zone: UTC-5 (Eastern (EST))
  - Summer (DST): UTC-4 (EDT)
- ZIP Codes: 13118 (Moravia); 13077 (Homer)
- Area code: 315
- FIPS code: 36-011-66278
- GNIS feature ID: 0979479
- Website: www.cayugacounty.us/1001/Sempronius-Town

Sempronius is a town in Cayuga County, New York, United States. The population was 840 at the 2020 census. The town was named after a Roman military and political leader by Robert Harpur, a clerk interested in the classics. Sempronius is in the southeastern part of the county, southeast of Auburn.

== History ==
Sempronius was part of the Central New York Military Tract. The first settler arrived c. 1793. Sempronius became a town in 1799 by breaking away from Scipio, but its area was later reduced by the formation of newer towns: Marcellus (Onondaga County) in 1804, Moravia and Niles in 1833.

Sempronius was the birthplace of the 12th Governor of Illinois (1860–1861) John Wood on December 20, 1798.

== Geography ==
According to the United States Census Bureau, Sempronius has a total area of 29.7 square miles (77.0 km^{2}), of which 29.3 square miles (76.0 km^{2}) is land and 0.39 square miles (1.0 km^{2}), or 1.28%, is water. The northern part of the eastern town line borders the southern end of Skaneateles Lake and Onondaga County; the rest of the eastern town line borders Cortland County.

New York State Route 41A is a north–south highway in the town.

== Demographics ==
Historical population
Census	Pop.	Note	%±
1820	5,033		—
1830	5,705		13.4%
1840	1,304		−77.1%
1850	1,266		−2.9%
1860	1,262		−0.3%
1870	1,165		−7.7%
1880	1,138		−2.3%
1890	981		−13.8%
1900	896		−8.7%
1910	756		−15.6%
1920	575		−23.9%
1930	543		−5.6%
1940	526		−3.1%
1950	572		8.7%
1960	548		−4.2%
1970	649		18.4%
1980	733		12.9%
1990	802		9.4%
2000	893		11.3%
2010	895		0.2%
2020	840		−6.1%
U.S. Decennial Census

As of the census of 2000, there were 893 people, 311 households, and 238 families residing in the town. The population density was 30.4 inhabitants per square mile (11.7/km^{2}). There were 405 housing units at an average density of 13.8 per square mile (5.3/km^{2}). The racial makeup of the town was 97.42% White, 0.56% African American, 0.34% Native American, 0.90% Asian, 0.22% Pacific Islander, and 0.56% from two or more races. Hispanic or Latino of any race were 0.78% of the population.

There were 311 households, out of which 41.5% had children under the age of 18 living with them, 61.4% were married couples living together, 7.7% had a female householder with no husband present, and 23.2% were non-families. 18.0% of all households were made up of individuals, and 5.1% had someone living alone who was 65 years of age or older. The average household size was 2.87 and the average family size was 3.21.

In the town, the population was spread out, with 30.9% under the age of 18, 7.6% from 18 to 24, 30.3% from 25 to 44, 25.0% from 45 to 64, and 6.2% who were 65 years of age or older. The median age was 33 years. For every 100 females, there were 111.6 males. For every 100 females age 18 and over, there were 116.5 males.

The median income for a household in the town was $38,611, and the median income for a family was $39,813. Males had a median income of $30,417 versus $22,438 for females. The per capita income for the town was $15,365. About 6.3% of families and 8.9% of the population were below the poverty line, including 9.5% of those under age 18 and 5.9% of those age 65 or over.

== Communities and locations in Sempronius ==
- Dresserville – A hamlet in the southern part of the town at the influx of Mill Creek into Dresserville Creek. The village is named after Artemas Dresser, the first permanent settler and a subsequent owner of mills.
- Dresserville Creek – A stream flowing out the western side of the town past Morse Hill. The stream flows to Owasco Inlet in Moravia.
- Fall Creek – A stream flowing southward near the eastern town line. It flows southwest to the southern end of Cayuga Lake in Ithaca.
- Glen Haven – A hamlet on the southwestern shore of Skaneateles Lake. It was the location of "water cure" resorts in the 19th century.
- Hardy Corners – A location on NY Route 41A in the central part of the town.
- Mill Brook – A stream flowing past Sempronius village. It is the primary tributary of Dresserville Creek.
- Morse Hill – A hamlet in the western part of the town, west of Sempronius village.
- Murphy Corners – A location north of Sempronius village.
- Sayles Corners – A hamlet in the northwestern part of the town.
- Sempronius – The hamlet of Sempronius on NY-41A.
- Wards Corners – A location between Sempronius village and Dresserville.

== Notable people ==
- Rhoda A. Esmond (1819–1894), American philanthropist, temperance leader
