= New York State Route 38 =

Highway in New York

New York State Route 38
- Map of New York with NY 38 highlighted in red

Route information
- Maintained by NYSDOT and the city of Auburn
- Length: 95.65 mi (153.93 km)
- Existed: 1930–present

Major junctions
- South end: NY 96 in Owego
- NY 13 in Dryden; US 20 / NY 5 in Auburn
- North end: NY 104A in Sterling

Location
- Country: United States
- State: New York
- Counties: Tioga, Cortland, Tompkins, Cayuga

Highway system
- New York Highways; Interstate; US; State; Reference; Parkways
← NY 37C	→ NY 38A

New York State Route 38 (NY 38) is a north–south state highway in the Finger Lakes region of New York in the United States. Its southern terminus is at an intersection with NY 96 in the town of Owego in Tioga County. The northern terminus is at a junction with NY 104A in the town of Sterling in Cayuga County. NY 38 is a two-lane local road for most of its length. The route is the main access road to parts of Auburn, Dryden, Newark Valley and Port Byron. It passes through mountainous terrain in Tioga and Cortland counties, but the terrain levels out as it heads through the Finger Lakes area and Cayuga County.

The route intersects several long-distance highways, including NY 13 in Dryden, U.S. Route 20 (US 20) and NY 5 in Auburn, and NY 31 in Port Byron. It passes over the New York State Thruway (Interstate 90 or I-90) north of Port Byron; however, there is no connection between the two. NY 38 has two suffixed routes. The first, NY 38A is an alternate route of NY 38 between Moravia and Auburn, while the other, NY 38B, is a simple east–west connector in the Southern Tier. While NY 38 runs along the western shore of Owasco Lake, NY 38A travels to Auburn along a routing east of the lake.

NY 38 passes along or near waterbodies for much of its length. From its southern end in Owego to the town of Harford, the route parallels Owego Creek or a branch of said creek. Between Groton and Mentz, it runs along the aforementioned Owasco Lake and its inlet (south of the lake) and outlet (north of the lake). It also comes within 4 miles (6 km) of Lake Ontario at its northern end.

In the 1920s, the portion of NY 38 between Owego and Freeville was designated as New York State Route 42 while the segment from Freeville to Moravia was the southern part of New York State Route 26, a highway that continued north from Moravia to Syracuse. NY 38 was assigned as part of the 1930 renumbering of state highways in New York, utilizing all of pre-1930 NY 42, the Freeville–Moravia portion of NY 26, and a previously unnumbered highway north to Sterling. Originally, NY 38 extended south into the village of Owego by way of an overlap with NY 96. It was truncated to its current southern terminus by 1994.

== Route description ==
All of NY 38—save for two sections within the city of Auburn—is maintained by the New York State Department of Transportation (NYSDOT). In Auburn, the route is city-maintained to the north and south of where the route meets US 20 and NY 5 in downtown Auburn. The portion of NY 38 that runs between and overlaps with those two routes is state-maintained.

=== Tioga and Cortland counties ===
NY 38 begins at an intersection with NY 96 about 0.5 miles (0.8 km) north of the Owego village limits in the town of Owego. The road heads northeastward as a two-lane highway, paralleling Owego Creek as it proceeds along the base of a valley surrounding the waterway. The Tioga County portion of NY 38 passes through mostly rural, forested areas with only small, scattered pockets of development. The route continues toward the hamlet of Flemingville, where the Owego Creek splits into western and eastern branches. NY 38 does not enter the community; instead, it bypasses it to the southeast and follows the eastern branch of Owego Creek into the town of Newark Valley.

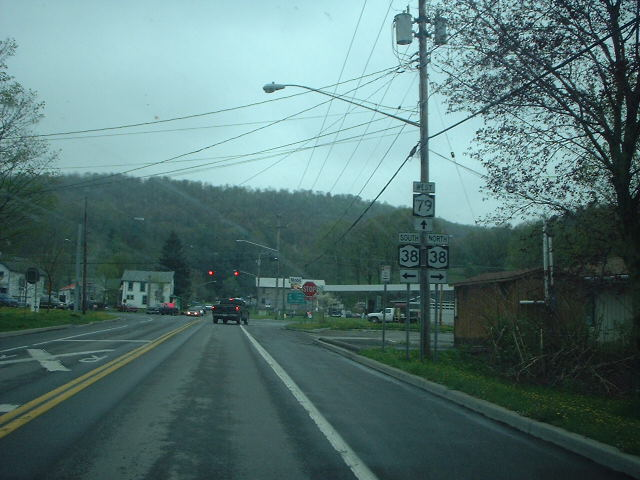
Approaching NY 38 on NY 79 westbound in Richford

The number of homes along the route begins to increase as NY 38 approaches the village of Newark Valley. Just south of the village limits, NY 38 intersects NY 38B, a spur leading to NY 26 in Maine. The route continues into the small village as South Main Street and passes by several blocks of homes and commercial buildings. At Water Street, NY 38 becomes North Main Street; however, from this point north, most of the village is situated on the opposite bank of Owego Creek. As a result, NY 38 continues through the village limits but passes very few buildings before seamlessly exiting the community and entering another rural area.

The route continues on, crossing over Owego Creek and passing the Newark Valley Country Club about 1 mile (1.6 km) north of Newark Valley village before entering the town of Berkshire. In Berkshire, NY 38 serves the hamlet of Berkshire, a small community situated directly on the highway. The route continues on through the narrowing creek valley into the town of Richford and the hamlet of the same name, where it meets NY 79 in the community's center. After Richford, the valley continues to narrow for just under 1.5 miles (2.4 km) before reversing course as the route heads into Cortland County and the town of Harford.

NY 38 clips the extreme southwestern corner of Cortland County; as a result, only 3.38 miles (5.44 km) of the route is located within the county. Just north of the county line, the route meets NY 200 in the hamlet of Harford Mills. NY 200 is little more than an alternate route to NY 221, which NY 38 meets in the hamlet of Harford 1.5 miles (2.4 km) to the northeast. In between Harford Mills and Harford, the east branch of Owego Creek separates from NY 38 and heads north to follow NY 221 instead. NY 38 continues northwest out of Harford hamlet and into Tompkins County.

=== Tompkins County ===
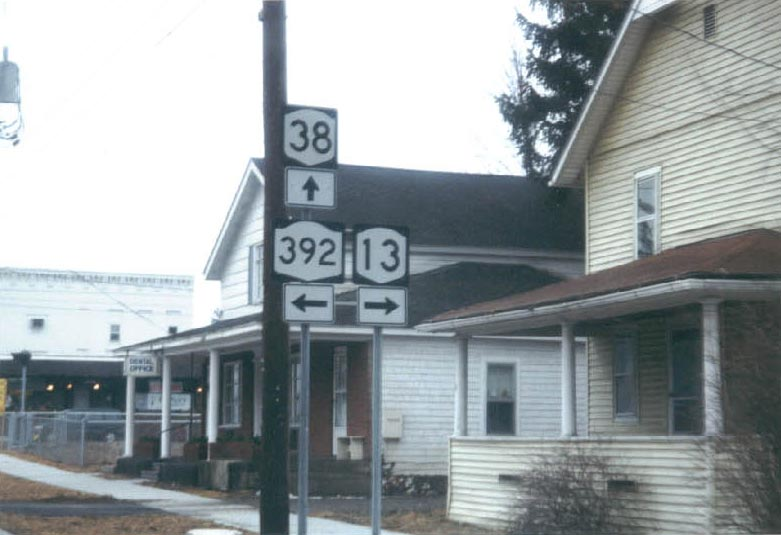
NY 38 at the intersection with NY 13 and NY 392 in Dryden

Upon entering the border town of Dryden, NY 38 emerges from the valley and becomes Dryden–Harford Road as it heads northwestward through a more low-lying but still undeveloped area. The highway gradually curves to the north toward the village of Dryden, where the route changes names to South Street upon entering the village limits. It continues north across Virgil Creek and past three blocks of homes to the commercial village center, where it intersects both NY 13 and NY 392. The latter begins here and heads off to the east while the former joins NY 38 along North Street.

The overlap between NY 13 and NY 38 ends at the northern village line. At this point, NY 13 continues north while NY 38 forks to the west, running along the village limits on Freeville Road for about 1 mile (1.6 km) through an area with only a handful of homes. While doing so, the route passes to the south of the Dryden Middle and High School complex. NY 38 heads onward through an open, undeveloped area, curving to the northwest and eventually to the north as it approaches the village of Freeville, where it serves the William George Agency for Children's Services at the southern village line. It remains on Freeville Road until Railroad Street, where it turns west and proceeds into the densely populated village center. Here, it intersects the eastern terminus of NY 366 at a junction situated adjacent to Fall Creek.

NY 38 proceeds out of Freeville, passing over Fall Creek and heading north along Groton Road through a lightly populated area of the town of Dryden. The route passes by a mixture of open fields, forests, and isolated homes on its way to the Dryden–Groton town line, where it meets the southern terminus of NY 34B southeast of the hamlet of Peruville. NY 38 parallels the Owasco Inlet into Groton and the village of the same name, becoming Peru Road at the southern village line. It continues north, following South and Main Streets through the densely populated village to an intersection with NY 222's western terminus at Cortland Street. At this point, NY 38 becomes Cayuga Street and winds its way northward along the Owasco Inlet and out of the village. Now known as Locke Road, NY 38 heads the northwest through another rural, largely undeveloped area into Cayuga County.

=== Cayuga County ===
Cayuga County, located in the Finger Lakes region of New York, has a highly unorthodox shape. Most of the county is only about 15 miles (24 km) wide from its western border to its eastern edge. From north to south, however, it extends from Locke north to the Lake Ontario shoreline—a distance of about 55 miles (89 km). NY 38 passes through much of the county, ending about 4 miles (6 km) south of the shoreline in Sterling. As a result, over half of NY 38's routing is located in the county, with the midpoint located near the city of Auburn.

==== County line to Auburn ====
The route heads northwest from the county line, following the Owasco Inlet through open fields and past small patches of trees to the large hamlet of Locke. NY 38 heads north–south through the residential community as Main Street and intersects NY 90 at the center of the hamlet. North of the community, the highway crosses over the Owasco Inlet and enters another rural area dominated by fields situated amongst forests. Upon crossing into the town of Moravia, the amount of development along the highway increases as it passes Fillmore Glen State Park and approaches the village of Moravia.

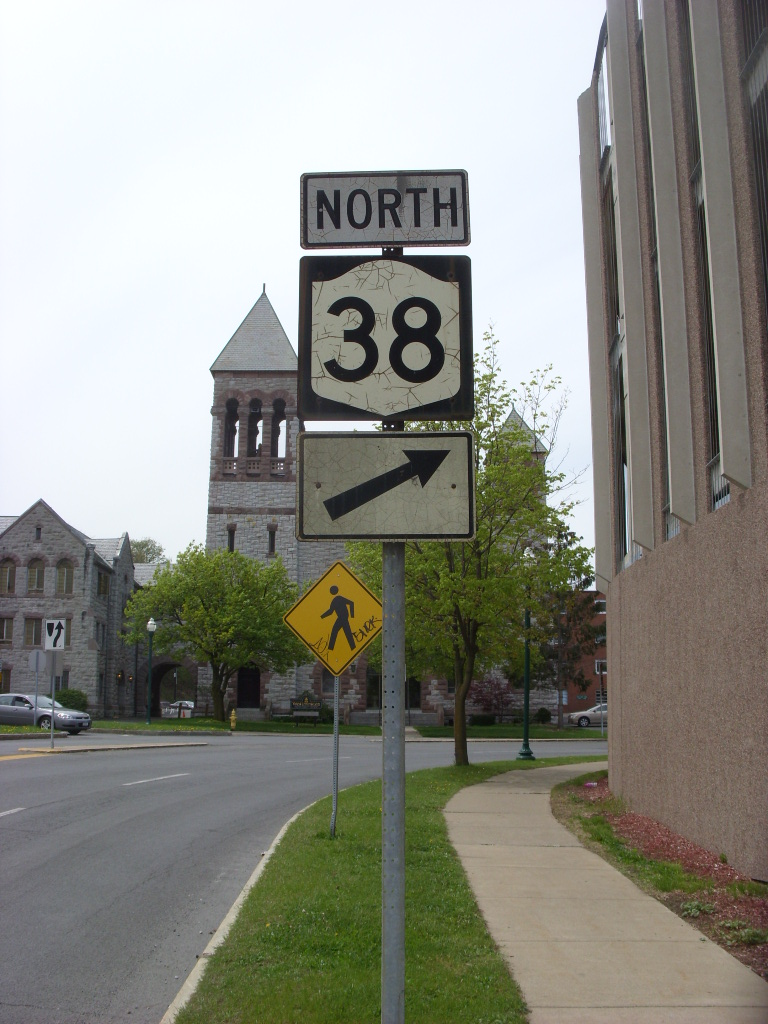
Old signage for NY 38 in Auburn

In Moravia, a highly developed village comprising several blocks of homes and businesses, NY 38 is known as Main Street as it heads north into the village center. At Cayuga Street, NY 38 intersects NY 38A, the second of its two suffixed routes. NY 38A heads eastward from this point while NY 38 turns to follow West Cayuga Street across Owasco Inlet and out of the village. Past the inlet, NY 38 curves to the north and runs along the western edge of the Owasco Flats, a wide, flat-bottomed, undeveloped valley at the foot of Owasco Lake. The flats give way to the lake in Cascade, a hamlet in the town of Venice, at which point NY 38 begins to climb up the western edge of the lake valley. It reaches the lip of the valley 2 miles (3.2 km) later in the town of Scipio.

For the next 2.5 miles (4.0 km), the route passes by open fields as it overlooks the lake to the east. The route gradually descends back into the valley as it heads further northward into the town of Fleming. Once in Fleming, NY 38 runs along the lakeshore and serves a long line of lakeside homes as it passes by a series of fields to the west. The amount of development along the route begins to increase at the northern end of the lake in the hamlet of Melrose Park, where NY 38 meets NY 437 by way of a traffic circle. At this point, NY 437 becomes the primary lakeside highway while NY 38 becomes a four-lane divided highway and heads northwest as Lake Avenue toward the city of Auburn.

As NY 38 enters Auburn, it passes by Auburn High School before heading north through densely populated blocks filled with homes. The divided highway ends abruptly at Swift Street, where NY 38 turns west to follow the two-lane undivided Swift Street west for seven blocks to NY 34 (South Street). Here, NY 38 leaves Swift Street and joins NY 34 on South Street. The two routes follow South Street past the William H. Seward House into downtown Auburn, where the homes are replaced with businesses at Lincoln Street. Three blocks later, South Street intersects with the East Arterial (eastbound US 20 and NY 5). The overlap between NY 34 and NY 38 ends one block later at the West Arterial (westbound US 20 and NY 5), where NY 38 turns to follow the Arterial for a block to the west.

At State Street, NY 38 leaves US 20 and NY 5 and heads north through the city's north side, crossing the Owasco Outlet and serving the Auburn Correctional Facility. The route passes through several blocks of commercial and residential development up to Grant Street, where it begins to taper off. It ceases almost entirely near the northern city line at York Street, where the homes along the highway become more sporadic and spaced apart.

==== North of Auburn ====
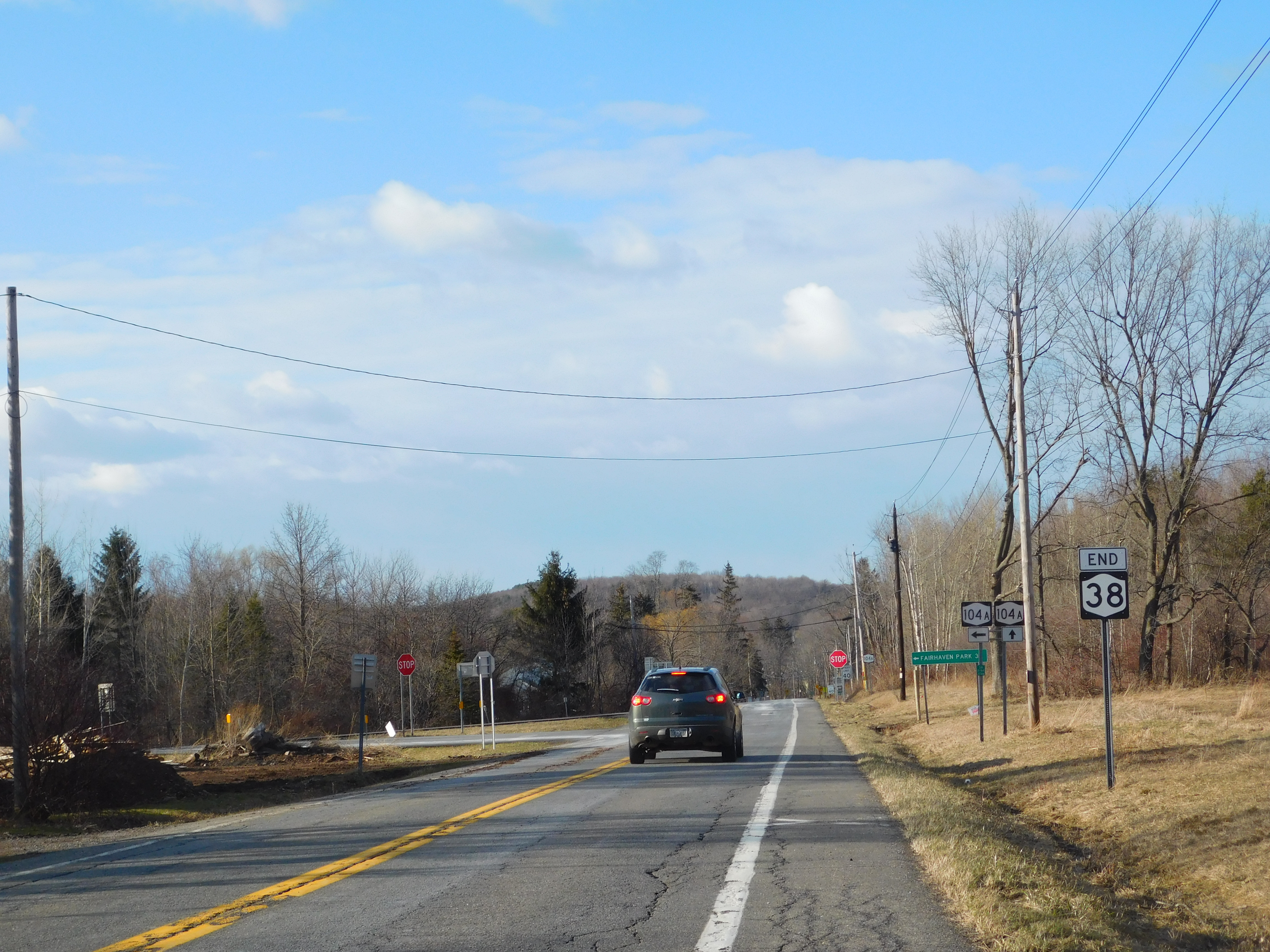
NY 38 approaching NY 104A

Now in the town of Throop, NY 38 follows the Owasco Outlet through open, mostly flat areas dotted with houses amongst fields and trees. Within Throop, it serves the small hamlet of Sawyers Corners, where NY 38 meets Turnpike Road (County Route 10B or CR 10B). North of this junction, the houses give way to dense forests as the route continues along the waterway into the town of Mentz and the village of Port Byron a short distance north of the town line. It follows Main Street through a mostly commercial and industrial portion of the village to the village center, where it intersects NY 31 at Rochester and Utica Streets. NY 38 turns west, overlapping NY 31 along Rochester Street.

The two routes cross the Owasco Outlet and enter a more residential area of the community, where NY 38 splits from NY 31 and continues north along Canal Street. The route crosses over the New York State Thruway (I-90) as it leaves the village limits and heads north into a largely undeveloped area of forests and fields. At North Port Byron, a sparsely populated hamlet 0.5 miles (0.8 km) north of Port Byron, NY 38 passes over the CSX Transportation-owned Rochester Subdivision railroad line. The highway continues on, becoming Conquest Road and crossing the Seneca River (Erie Canal) at Mosquito Point, near where Owasco Outlet flows into the river. NY 38 enters the town of Conquest upon traversing the waterway.

NY 38 continues north as an unnamed highway to the hamlet of Conquest, a small community built up around the intersection of NY 38 and Fuller and Slayton Roads. It continues on into the town of Victory, where the undeveloped fields give way to cultivated fields used as farmland. The route heads through mostly desolate surroundings to the hamlet of Victory, a slightly larger community centered on NY 38. The route proceeds through the hamlet, passing by several homes on its way to a junction with NY 370 just north of the community. Past this point, the homes cease again as NY 38 presses on through more fields and forests to the town of Sterling.

Just north of the town line in the small hamlet of North Victory, NY 38 intersects NY 104. Past this point, the route heads through mostly undeveloped, forested areas on its way to the hamlet of Finches Corners. North of here, the forests cede slightly as the number of fields along the highway increases. The highway continues on to the hamlet of Sterling, where it ends at an intersection with NY 104A (the Seaway Trail) just south of the hamlet's center and 4 miles (6 km) south of the Lake Ontario shoreline.

== History ==
=== Old roads ===
Several portions of modern NY 38 were originally part of turnpikes and plank roads during the 1800s. On April 13, 1819, the New York State Legislature passed a law incorporating the Cortland and Owego Turnpike Company. The company was tasked with building a highway—the Cortland and Owego Turnpike—from Owego north to the then-village of Cortland. This route roughly followed what is now NY 38 north from Owego to the vicinity of Harford, where it would have turned north to access Virgil, then continued to Cortland by way of modern NY 215. A property dispute case in 1965 showed no evidence of this turnpike having been built.

On April 13, 1825, the legislature chartered the Auburn and Port Byron Turnpike Company. The Auburn and Port Byron Turnpike began at the Auburn State Prison in Auburn and proceeded northward along the routing of NY 38 to meet the north branch of the Seneca Turnpike in the town of Brutus (now Throop). From there, the turnpike continued on NY 38 through Port Byron to the Seneca River, where it ended at a bridge crossing the river at Mosquito Point. In 1851, the Auburn and Moravia Plank Road Company was incorporated. They were tasked with connecting Moravia to Auburn by way of a plank road along the western side of Owasco Lake (now NY 38).

=== Designation ===
When the first set of posted routes in New York were assigned in 1924, the portion of what is now NY 38 from Freeville to Moravia became part of NY 26, a north–south highway extending from Freeville to Syracuse via Skaneateles. By 1926, the segment of current NY 38 between Freeville and Owego was designated as NY 42. In the 1930 renumbering of state highways in New York, the entirety of NY 42 and the portion of NY 26 south of Moravia was incorporated into the new NY 38, which extended north from Moravia to NY 3 (modern NY 104A) in Sterling. The section of the route adjacent to Owasco Lake was still being constructed at the time of NY 38's assignment; it was completed c. 1932.

NY 38 originally overlapped with NY 96 (designated as NY 15 in 1930) through Owego to a terminus at the modern junction of NY 96 and NY 434 south of the village. The overlap was extended slightly along Southside Drive to NY 17 exit 64 in the 1960s following the construction of the Southern Tier Expressway through the area. It was removed altogether when NY 38 was truncated to the northern end of the overlap by 1994.

== Suffixed routes ==
NY 38 has two suffixed spur routes:

- NY 38A (21.91 miles or 35.26 kilometres) runs from Moravia to NY 359, near Mandana and NY 41A in southwestern Onondaga County, and then towards Auburn. It was assigned as part of the 1930 renumbering of state highways in New York.
- NY 38B (7.69 miles or 12.38 kilometres) is a short spur in Broome and Tioga counties connecting NY 38 in Newark Valley in the west to NY 26 in Maine in the east. It was assigned in 1948.

== Major intersections ==
County	Location	mi	km	Destinations	Notes
Tioga	Town of Owego	0.00	0.00	NY 96 – Owego, Candor, Ithaca	Southern terminus
Tioga	Town of Newark Valley	7.29	11.73	NY 38B east – Binghamton	Western terminus of NY 38B
Tioga	Richford	18.01	28.98	NY 79 – Whitney Point, Ithaca	
Cortland	Harford	21.94	35.31	NY 200 east	Western terminus of NY 200; hamlet of Harford Mills
Cortland	Harford	23.53	37.87	NY 221 east – Marathon	Western terminus of NY 221; hamlet of Harford
Tompkins	Village of Dryden	29.69	47.78	NY 13 south / NY 392 east – Ithaca	Western terminus of NY 392; southern terminus of NY 13 / NY 38 overlap
Tompkins	Village of Dryden	30.22	48.63	NY 13 north – Cortland	Northern terminus of NY 13 / NY 38 overlap
Tompkins	Freeville	33.29	53.58	NY 366 west – Etna, Ithaca	Eastern terminus of NY 366
Tompkins	Dryden–Groton town line	35.93	57.82	NY 34B west – South Lansing	Eastern terminus of NY 34B; hamlet of Peruville
Tompkins	Village of Groton	39.04	62.83	NY 222 east	Western terminus of NY 222
Cayuga	Locke	45.15	72.66	NY 90	
Cayuga	Village of Moravia	48.91	78.71	NY 38A north	Southern terminus of NY 38A
Cayuga	Auburn	64.56	103.90	NY 437 east (White Bridge Road) to NY 38A – Emerson Park	Western terminus of NY 437
Cayuga	Auburn	66.57	107.13	NY 34 south	Southern terminus of NY 34 / NY 38 overlap
Cayuga	Auburn	67.49	108.61	US 20 east / NY 5 east – Syracuse	
Cayuga	Auburn	67.53	108.68	US 20 west / NY 5 west / NY 34 north – Weedsport	Northern terminus of NY 34 / NY 38 overlap; eastern terminus of US 20 / NY 5 / NY 38 overlap
Cayuga	Auburn	67.70	108.95	US 20 west / NY 5 west – Seneca Falls	Western terminus of US 20 / NY 5 / NY 38 overlap
Cayuga	Port Byron	75.27	121.14	NY 31 east to New York Thruway	Eastern terminus of NY 31 / NY 38 overlap
Cayuga	Port Byron	75.67	121.78	NY 31 west	Western terminus of NY 31 / NY 38 overlap
Cayuga	Victory	87.17	140.29	NY 370 – Cato	
Cayuga	Sterling	91.23	146.82	NY 104 – Oswego, Rochester	Hamlet of North Victory
Cayuga	Sterling	95.65	153.93	NY 104A – Fairhaven Park	Northern terminus
1.000 mi = 1.609 km; 1.000 km = 0.621 mi: Concurrency terminus
