= Church Street–Congress Street Historic District =

Historic district in New York, United States

- U.S. National Register of Historic Places
- U.S. Historic district
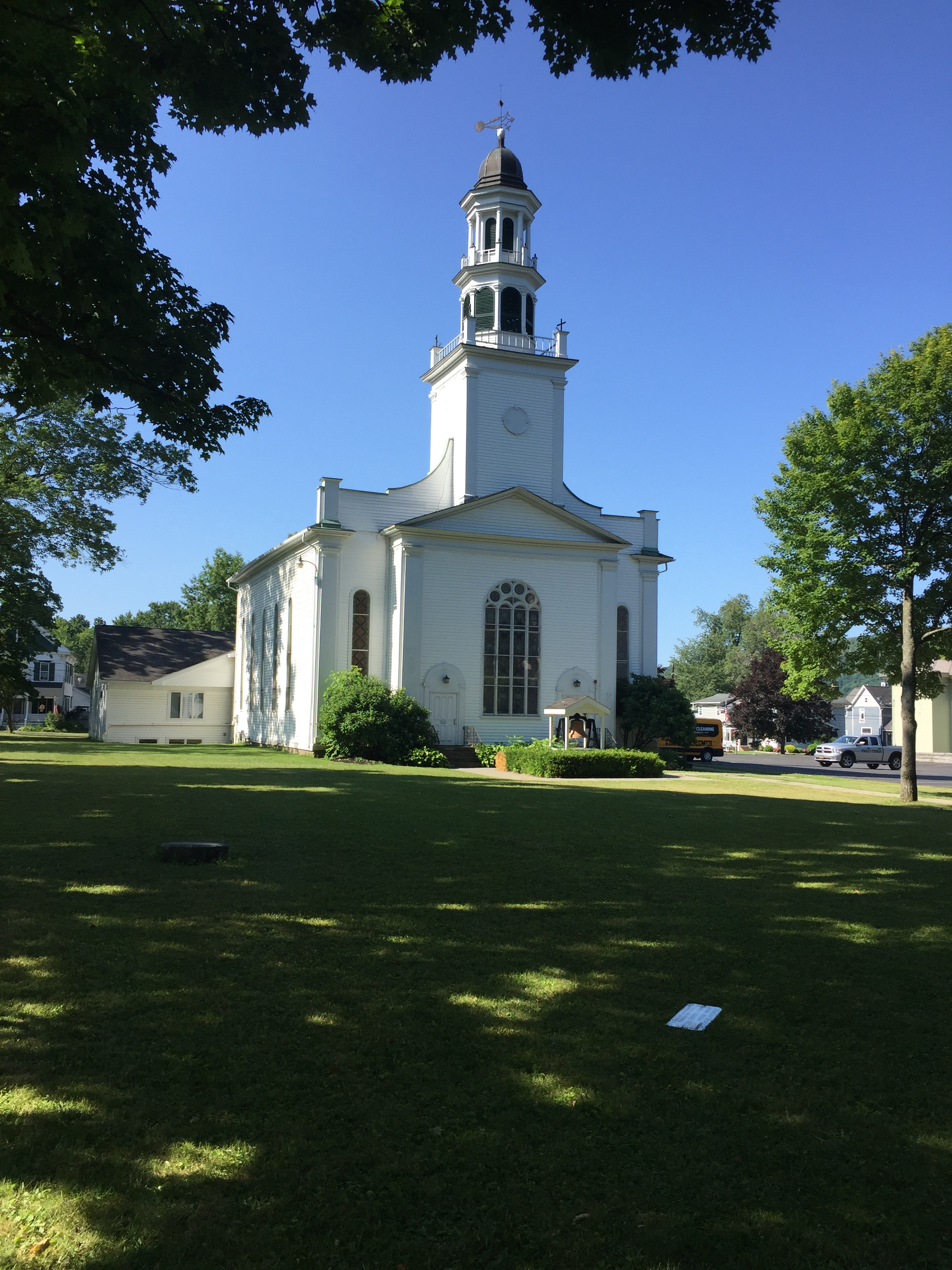
- First Congregational Church

- Location within New York Location within the United States
- Location: Roughly bounded by S. Main, Church, Park and Congress Sts., Moravia, New York
- Coordinates: 42°42′36″N 76°25′7″W
- Area: 43 acres (17 ha)
- Architectural style: Italianate, Greek Revival, Federal
- MPS: Moravia MPS
- NRHP reference No.: 92001364
- Added to NRHP: February 3, 1994

Church Street–Congress Street Historic District is a national historic district located in the village of Moravia in Cayuga County, New York. The district contains 122 contributing buildings and one contributing structure. It is primarily a residential district and preserves several intact examples from the village's earliest period of development, 1810–1830. Numerous residential structures date to the 1830–1840 period and are in the Greek Revival style. This includes the Federal style Congregational Church (1823). Other churches located in the district are the Romanesque style Baptist Church (1874) and the Gothic Revival St. Matthew's Episcopal Church (1897–1898). The district also includes the Powers Library (1880) building and Moravia High School (1924).

It was listed on the National Register of Historic Places in 1994.

Selected contributing properties are:

- U.S. Post Office (1940–41), South Main Street, WPA brick building. (Note: Note the Church Street-Congress Street HD document states that the U.S. Post Office on South Main Street in Moravia was separately NRHP-listed in 1991. And there were in fact numerous ones covered in a 1988-approved Multiple Resources study "United States Post Offices in New York State - 1858 to 1943 - Thematic Resources" (written by Larry E. Gobrecht, National Register and Survey Coordinator, New York State Office of Parks, Recreation and Historic Preservation, December 1986) which were identified as NRHP-eligible and separately listed in subsequent years, and the Moravia one is listed in that document's Appendix IV as presumed or assessed to be eligible for individual NRHP listing, but the Moravia one seems not ever to have been separately NRHP-listed.)
- St. Matthew's Episcopal Church (1897–1898), 16 Church St. A clapboarded frame church with a corner tower. Has noncontributing church school addition, built c.1960.
- Powers Library (1880), with Romanesque Revival style for its front, brick building
- First Congregational Church (1823), now Christ United Methodist Church, Federal in style with three-stage bell tower
- First Baptist Church (1874), 37 Church Street, brick Romanesque Revival building, expanded in 1891
- Jewett Mansion (c.1870), 30 Church Street, Second Empire mansion with c.1870 carriage house
- 35 Congress Street (1875), Italianate
- Former Moravia High School (1924)
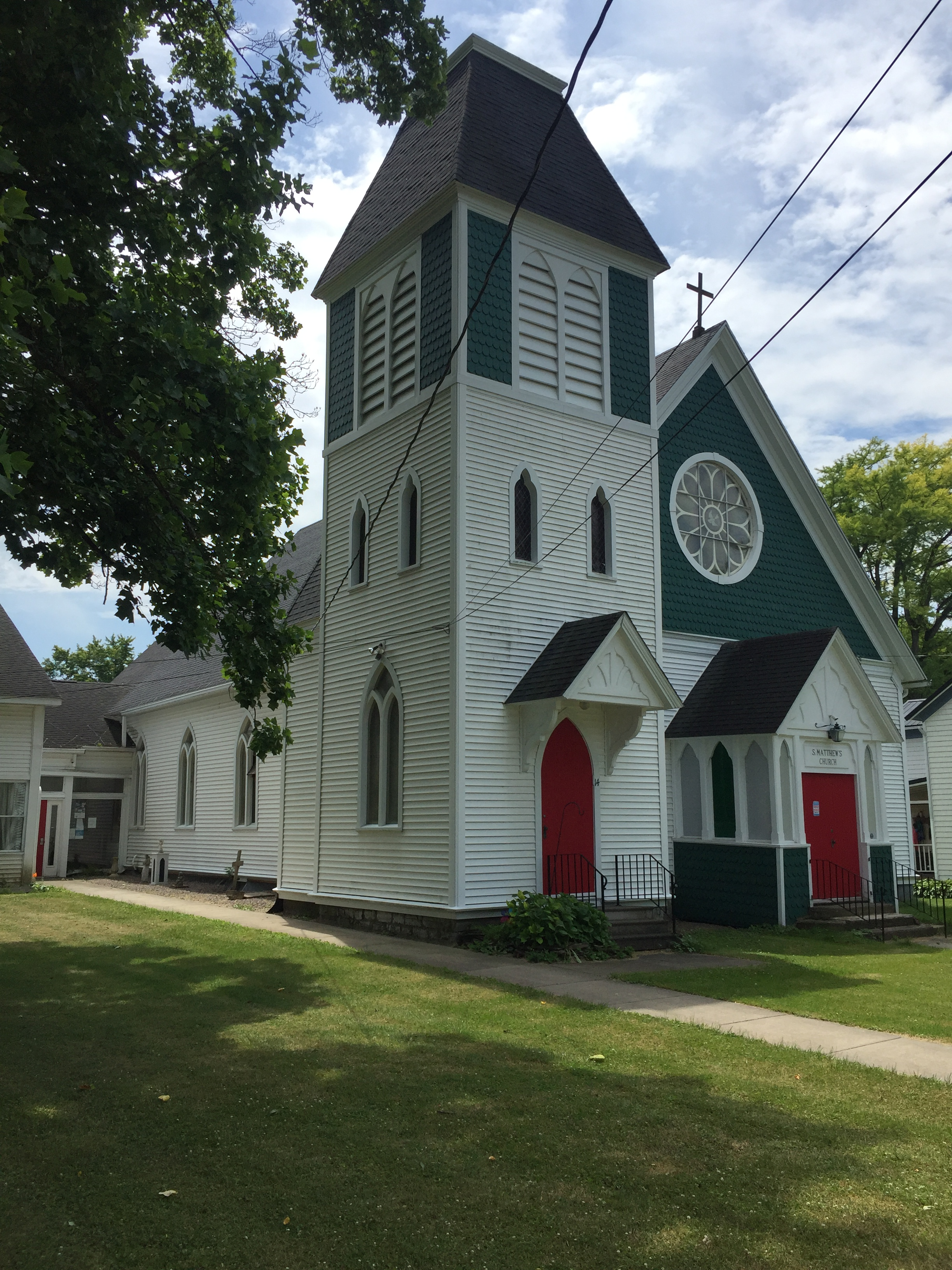
St. Matthew's Episcopal Church

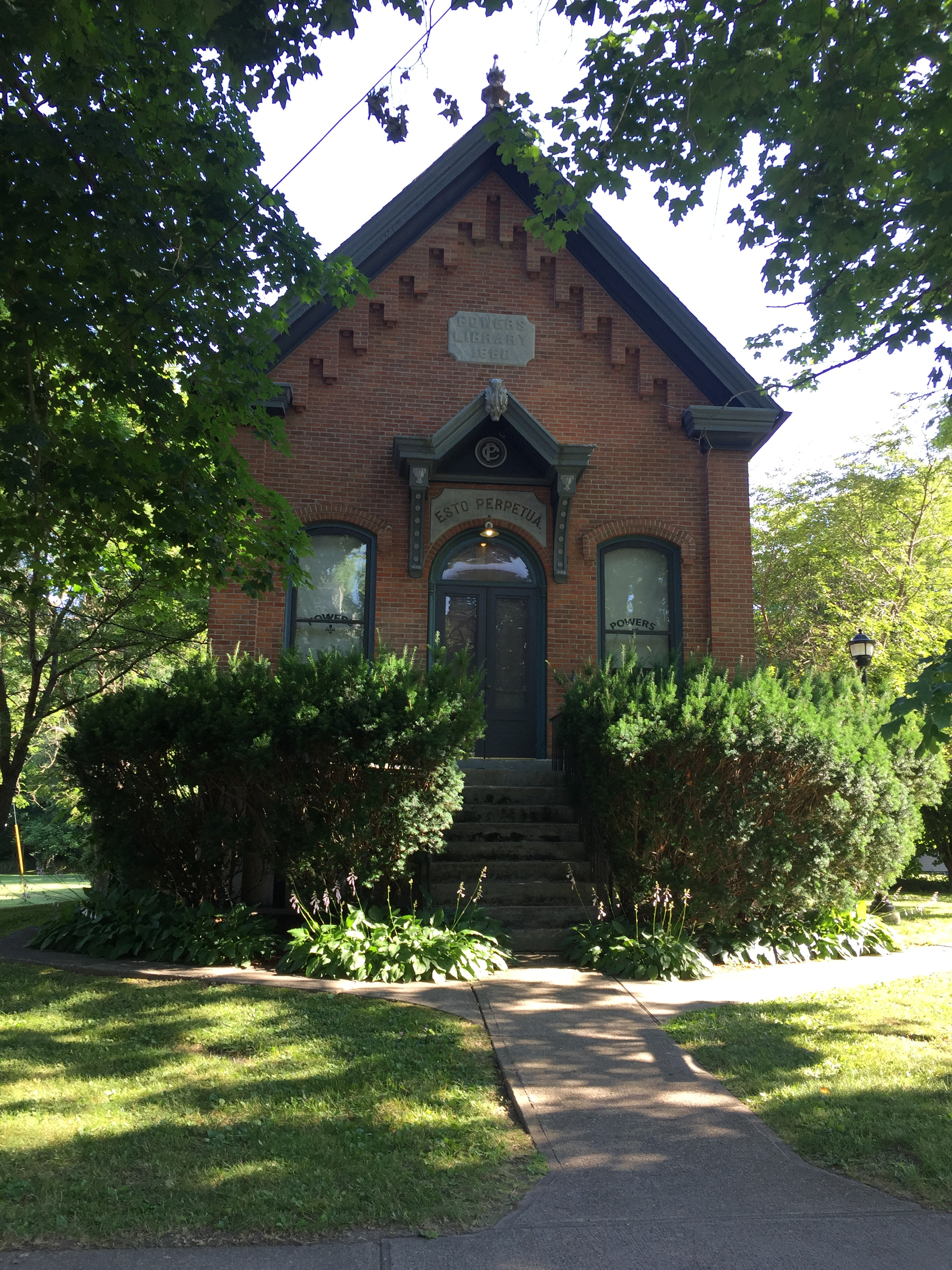
Powers Library (1880), front section

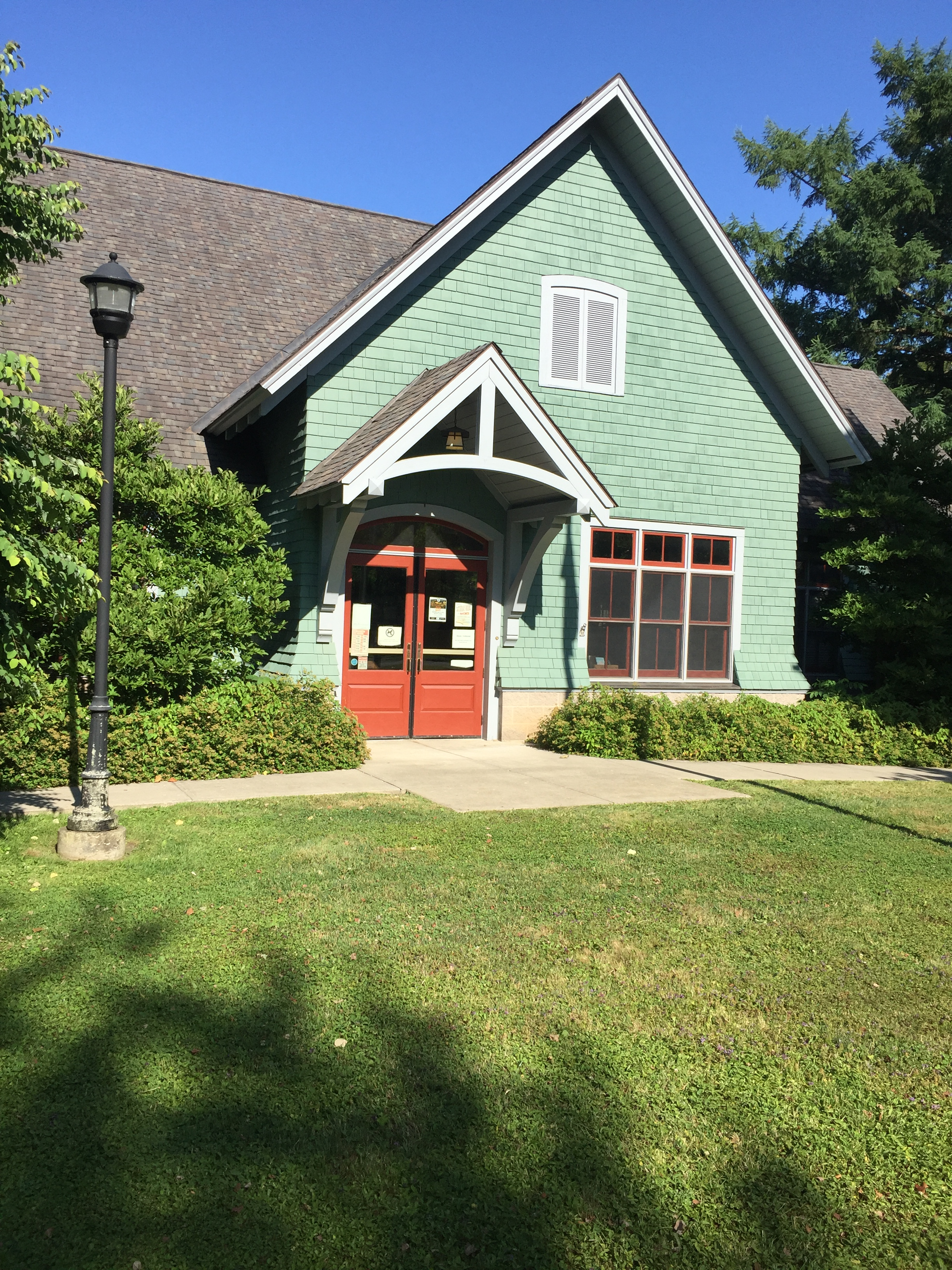
Powers Library, back section

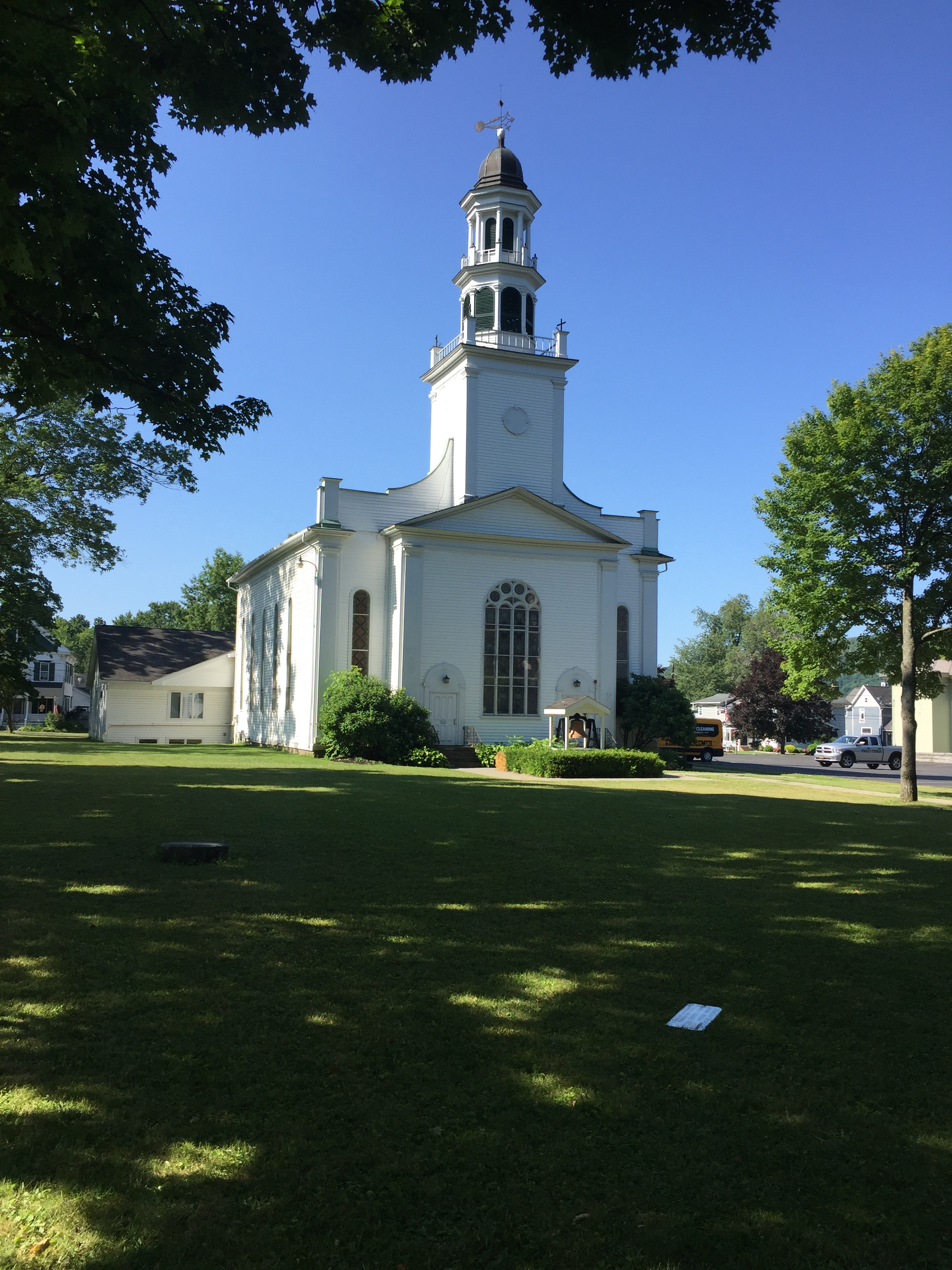
First Congregational Church (1823), now Christ United Methodist Church

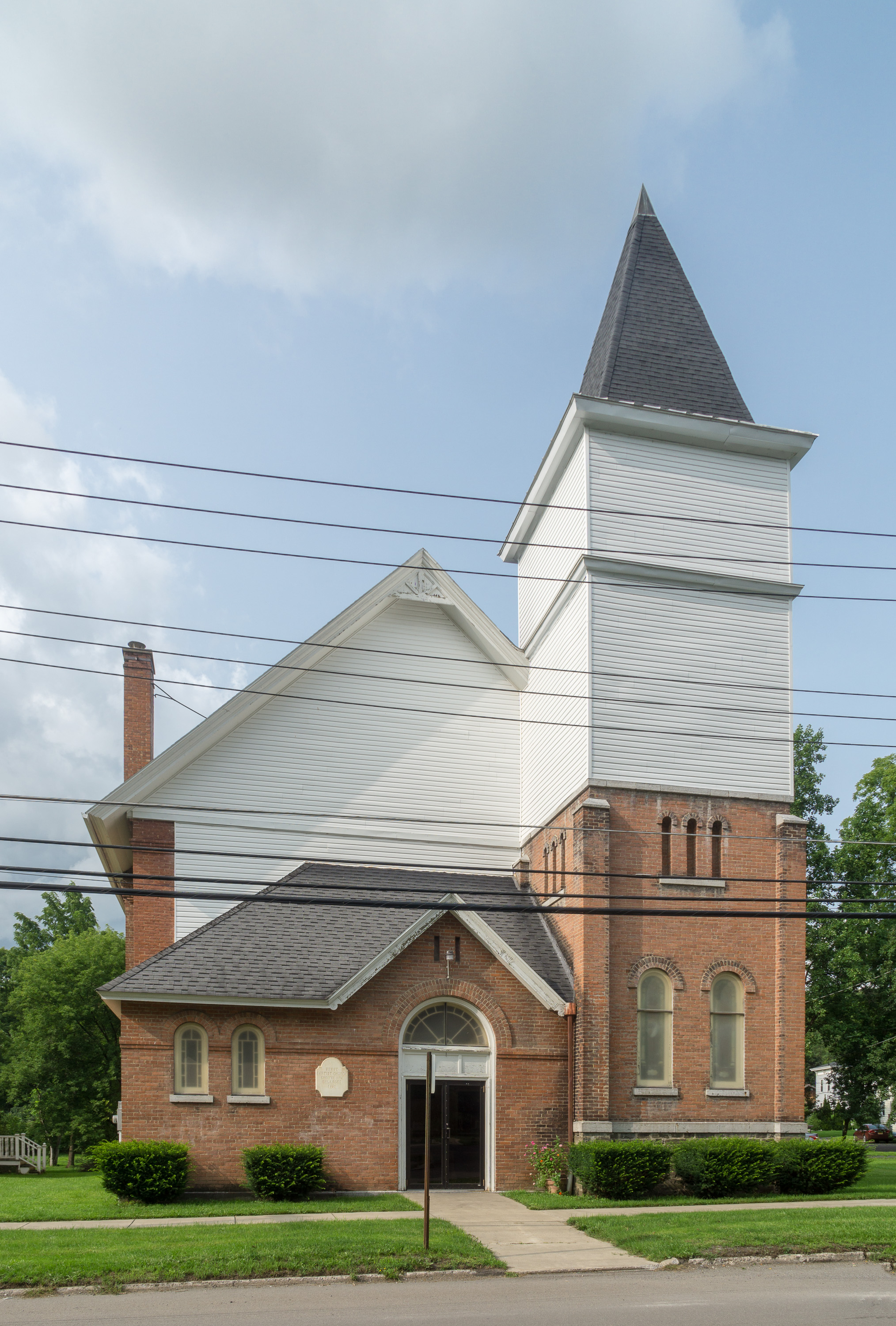
First Baptist Church

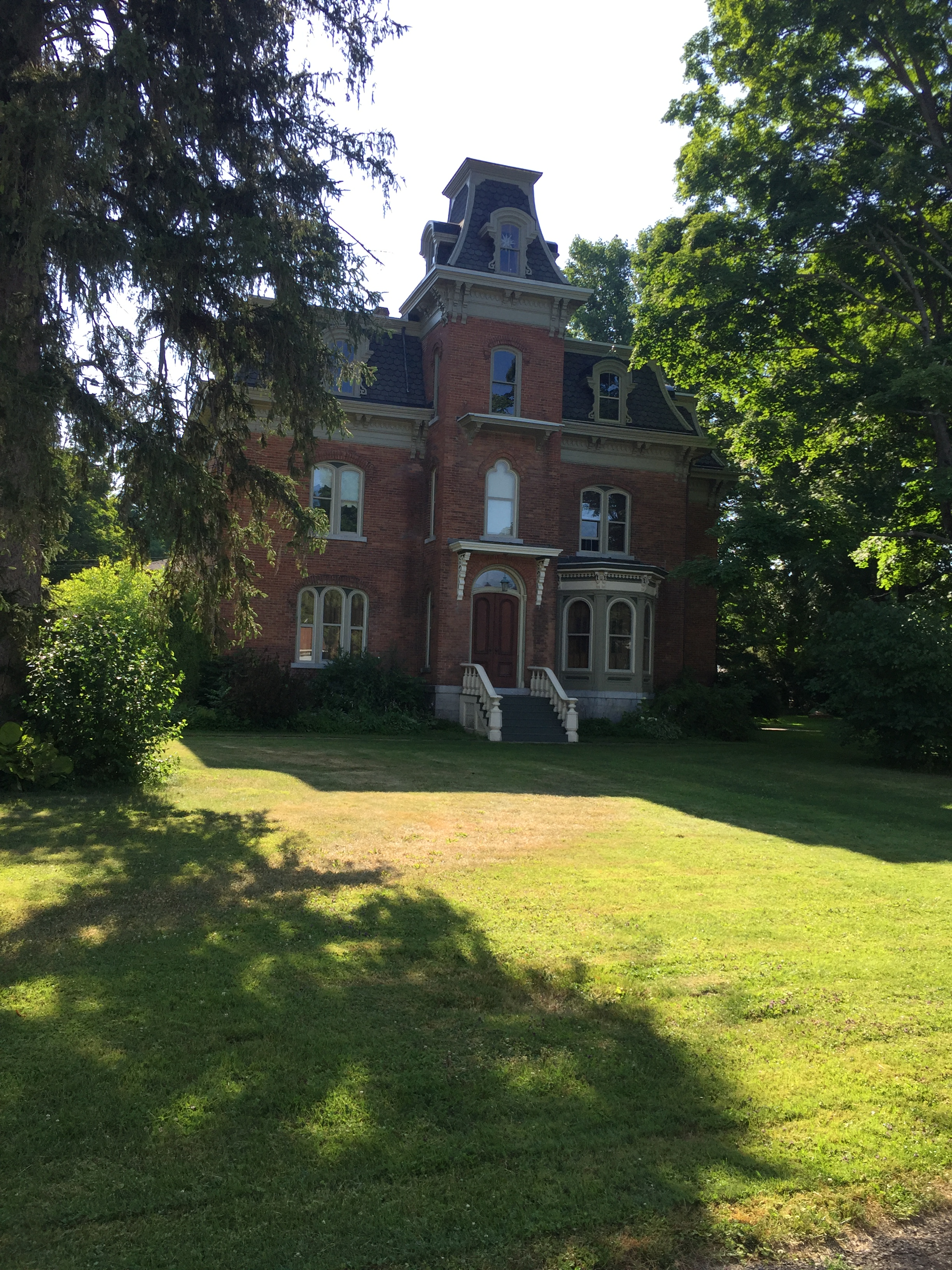
Jewett Mansion

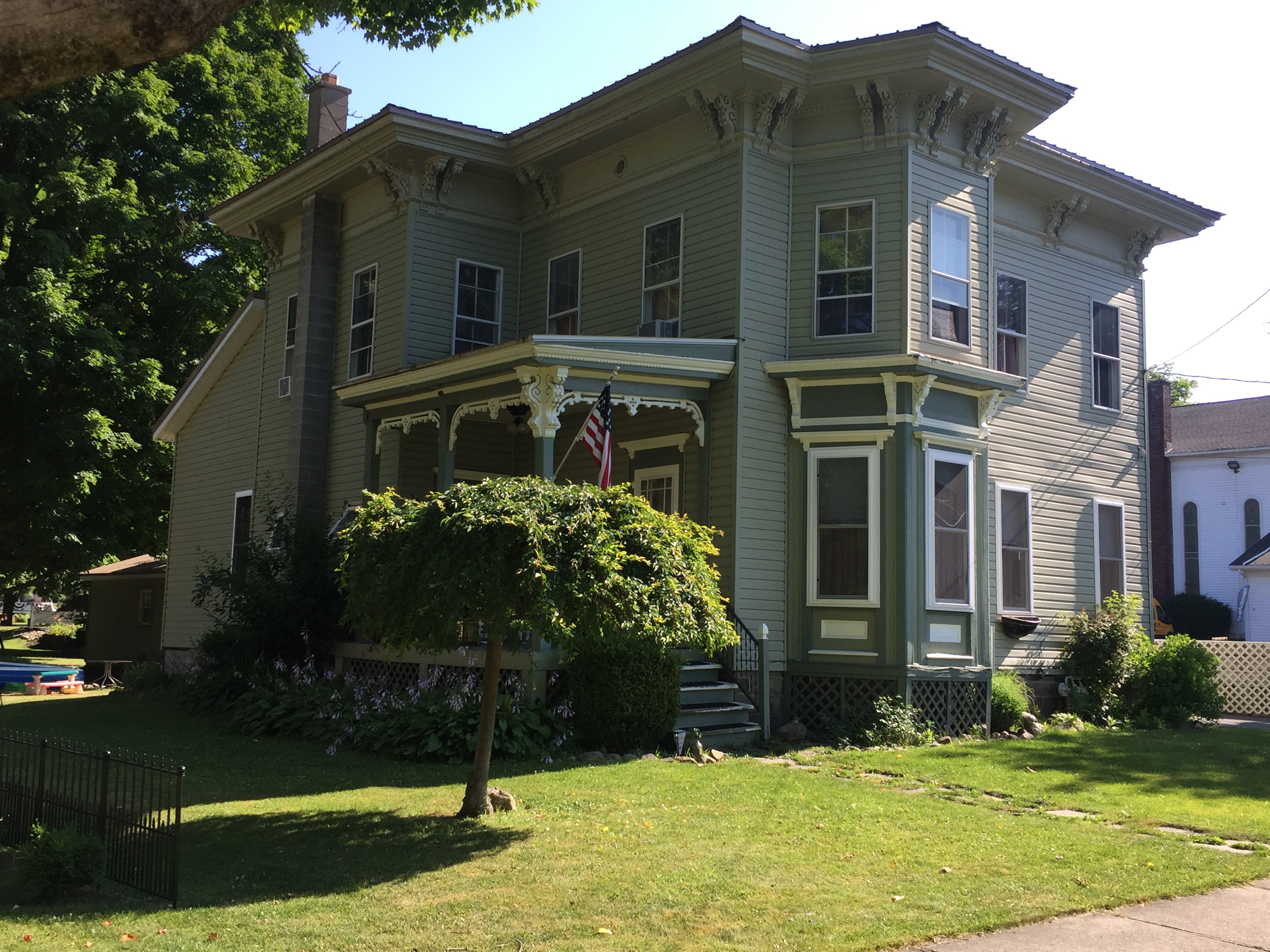
35 Congress Street

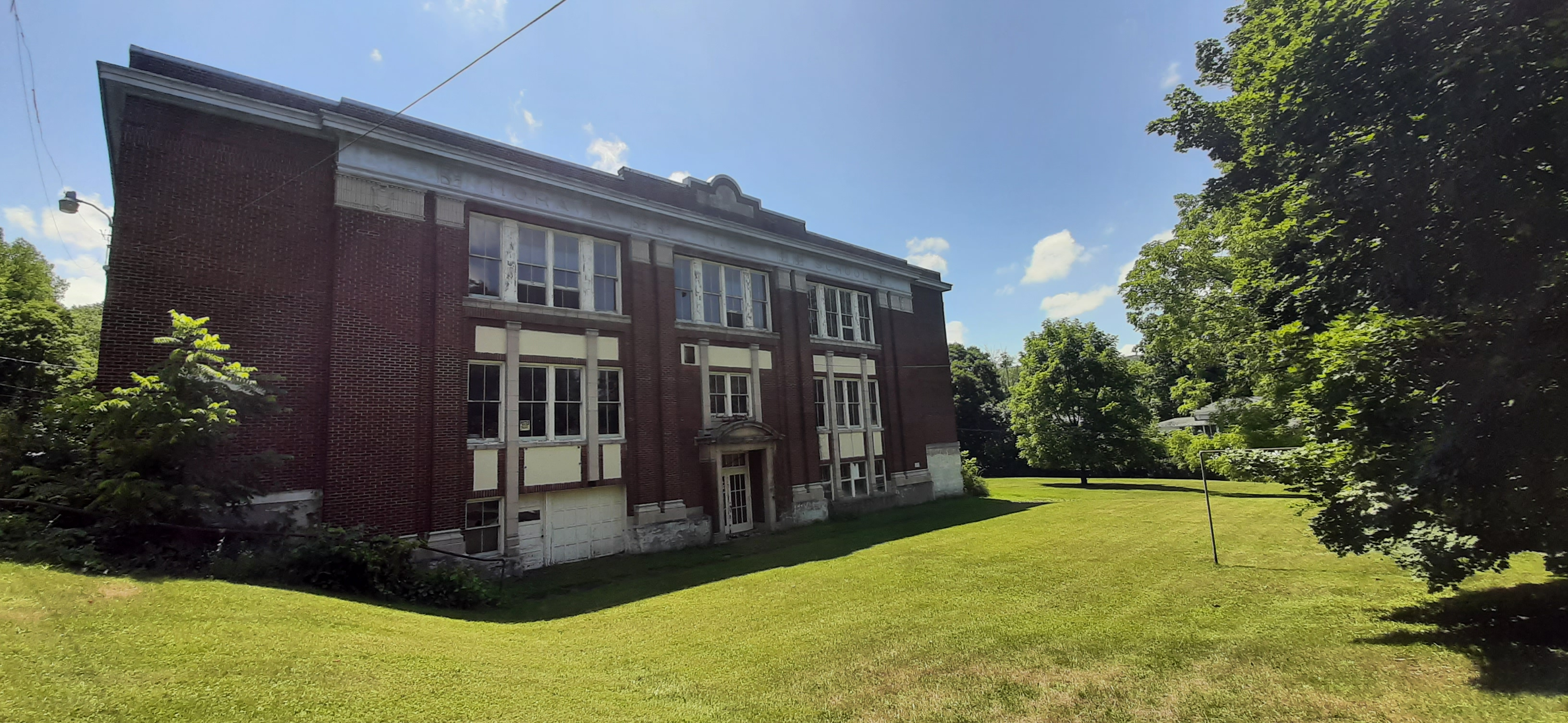
Moravia High School, on Church Street
