= New York State Route 38B =

Highway in New York

New York State Route 38B
- NY 38B highlighted in red

Route information
- Auxiliary route of NY 38
- Maintained by NYSDOT
- Length: 7.69 mi (12.38 km)
- Existed: 1948–present

Major junctions
- South end: NY 38 in Newark Valley
- North end: NY 26 in Maine

Location
- Country: United States
- State: New York
- Counties: Tioga, Broome

Highway system
- New York Highways; Interstate; US; State; Reference; Parkways
← NY 38A	→ NY 39

New York State Route 38B (NY 38B) is a 7.69-mile-long (12.38 km) west–east state highway located within Tioga and Broome counties in the Southern Tier of New York in the United States. The route begins at an intersection with NY 38 in the town of Newark Valley just south of the line for the eponymous village. NY 38B's eastern terminus is at a junction with NY 26 in the hamlet of Union Center in the town of Maine.

NY 38B was established in 1948 as a spur from Newark Valley to Union Center, but only the section in Broome County was maintained by the New York State Department of Public Works. Tioga County maintained their own section. As early as 1961, Tioga County officials lobbied the state to take over their section but was denied on account of lower Annual Average Daily Traffic (AADT) counts. In 1965, the county sought federal funds to pay for the construction of NY 38B's county-maintained section. The reconstruction project was announced in 1967, while construction began in 1968 and completed in October 1969, two months ahead of the scheduled completion date.

== Route description ==
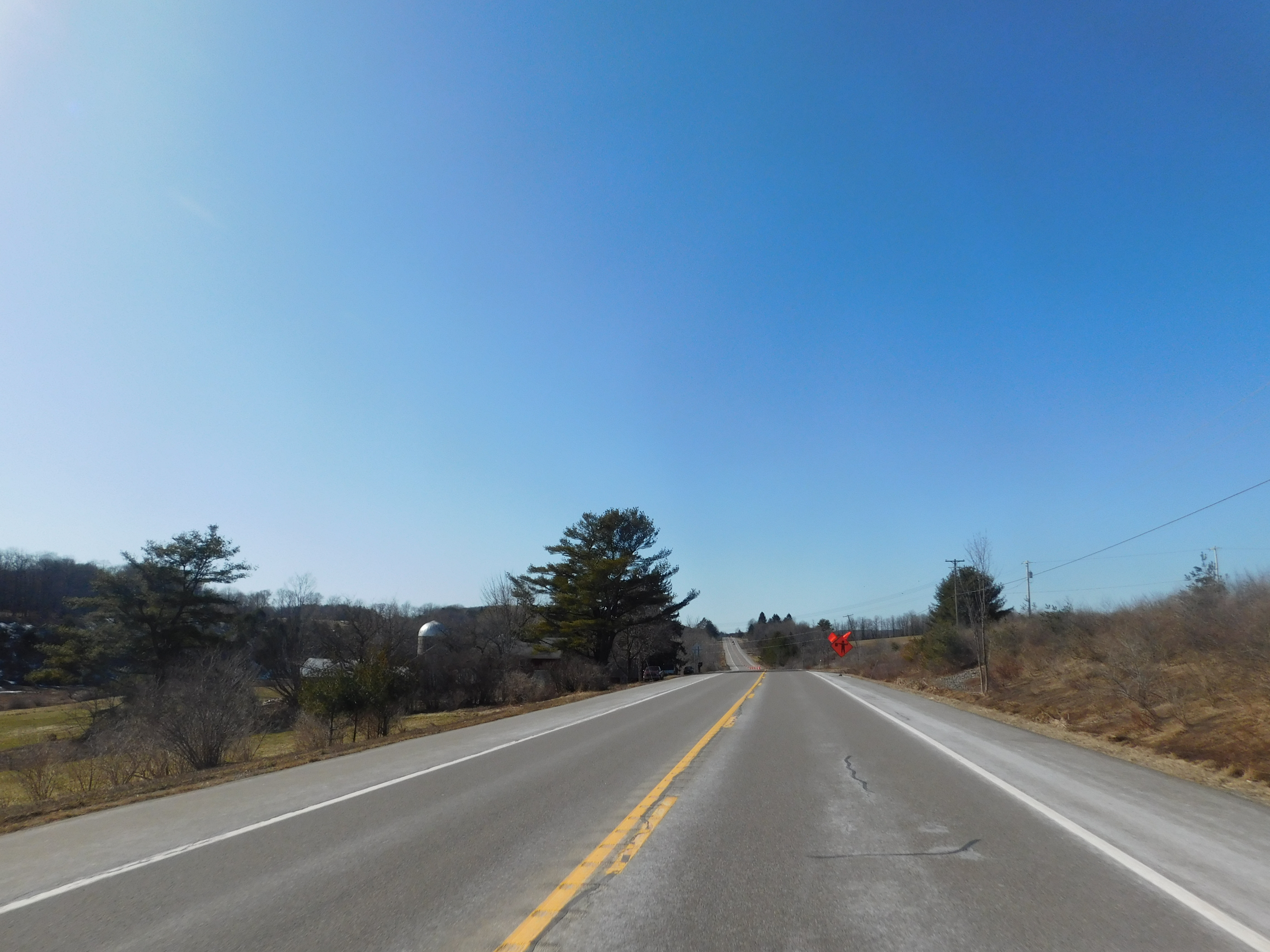
NY 38 westbound in Newark Valley

NY 38B begins at an intersection with NY 38 (South Main Street), its parent route in the town of Newark Valley, just south of the line for the village of Newark Valley. The road winds eastward as a two-lane arterial through the town of Newark Valley, reaching the hamlet of East Newark at the junction of Harnecky and Sherry Lipe roads. NY 38B bends southeastward and continues winding through the rural sections of Tioga County. Near the junction with Stratton Road, the route crosses into the town of Owego. Just east of that, the road crosses Crocker Creek, then the Broome County line and enters the town of Maine. Passing a junction with County Route 86 (CR 86; Old Newark Valley Road), NY 38B continues into the hamlet of Union Center. After a junction with CR 84 (Maple Drive), the route crosses Crocker Creek again and reaches a junction with NY 26 (Union Center–Maine Highway), just south of the mouth of Crocker Creek at Nanticoke Creek and north of the Union town line.

== History ==
The alignment of the Newark Valley–Union Center Road became a state highway in 1948 when it was taken over by the New York State Department of Public Works (NYSDPW). The state only maintained, however, the section within Broome County. The section through Tioga County remained a road maintained by the county. When the Broome County section came under state control, they rebuilt the roadway through that area only, leaving the Tioga side as decrepit.

In October 1961, the Tioga County Board of Supervisors passed a resolution requesting that the state reconstruct the section within the county, as well as take over maintenance. The county requested it because they did not have the money to be able to reconstruct the road itself. As part of the resolution, the road would be constructed to state standards. In November, the NYSDPW sent a letter to the county stating that due to low Annual Average Daily Traffic (AADT) counts (950 cars a day), the state decided it was not beneficial to maintain the Tioga County section. The state said it also had other priorities to focus on that were of higher importance than reconstruction of NY 38B.

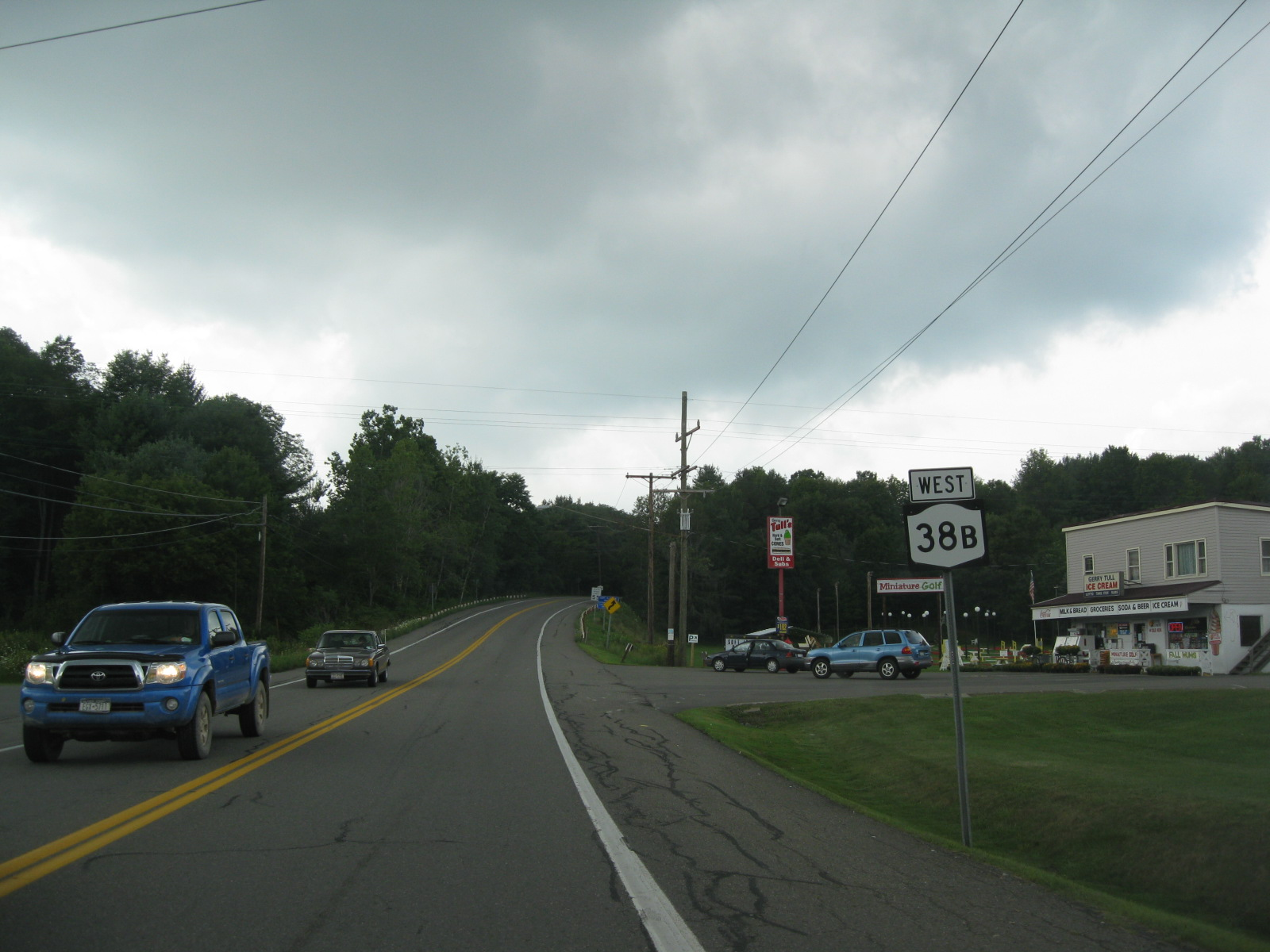
NY 38B westbound in Union Center

In July 1965, the county revisited the idea of rebuilding their section of NY 38B. The Board of Supervisors noted that the construction could be funded with Federal Aid Secondary Highway Funds. By doing so, the state would be required to do the reconstruction project, while the county would maintain the section afterwards. In May 1966, the county, along with several towns along the alignment, lobbied again to have the state takeover maintenance of the Tioga County section. The NYSDPW responded by stating that NY 38B would become a priority by Fall 1966, when they wrap up other important projects. They stated that the county would be responsible for acquiring a new right-of-way for the road while the state would consider taking over the road on a permanent basis. In August, the county offered the timetable that the reconstruction project would be done by 1968.

In January 1967, NY 38B was added to the state project list for the 1967–68 fiscal year. By this point, the county-maintained alignment was cracking and sinking in several locations, as well as some erosion. In April, it was announced that design plans would be complete by August 1 for the reconstruction. In November, the Governor of New York Nelson Rockefeller announced that bids would open on December 14 for the reconstruction project, costing $2.985 million (1967 USD). In January 1968, the state announced that the contract went to the Triple Cities Construction Company of Binghamton. The $2,311,510 job would involve rebuilding the section in Tioga County with new 24 feet (7.3 m) wide roadway with 9 feet (2.7 m) shoulders. This would replace the old alignment, which only had 18 feet (5.5 m) of roadway. The project would also have special 12 feet (3.7 m) climbing lanes for hills, a new bridge over Crocker Creek, and improvements to six intersections along the road. In all the project would be completed by December 31, 1969. The project was completed in October 1969, two months ahead of schedule.

== Major intersections ==
County	Location	mi	km	Destinations	Notes
Tioga	Town of Newark Valley	0.00	0.00	NY 38 (South Main Street) – Owego, Newark Valley	Western terminus
Broome	Maine	7.69	12.38	NY 26 (Union Center–Maine Highway) – Whitney Point, Endicott	Eastern terminus; Hamlet of Union Center
1.000 mi = 1.609 km; 1.000 km = 0.621 mi
