= Rhoda A. Esmond =

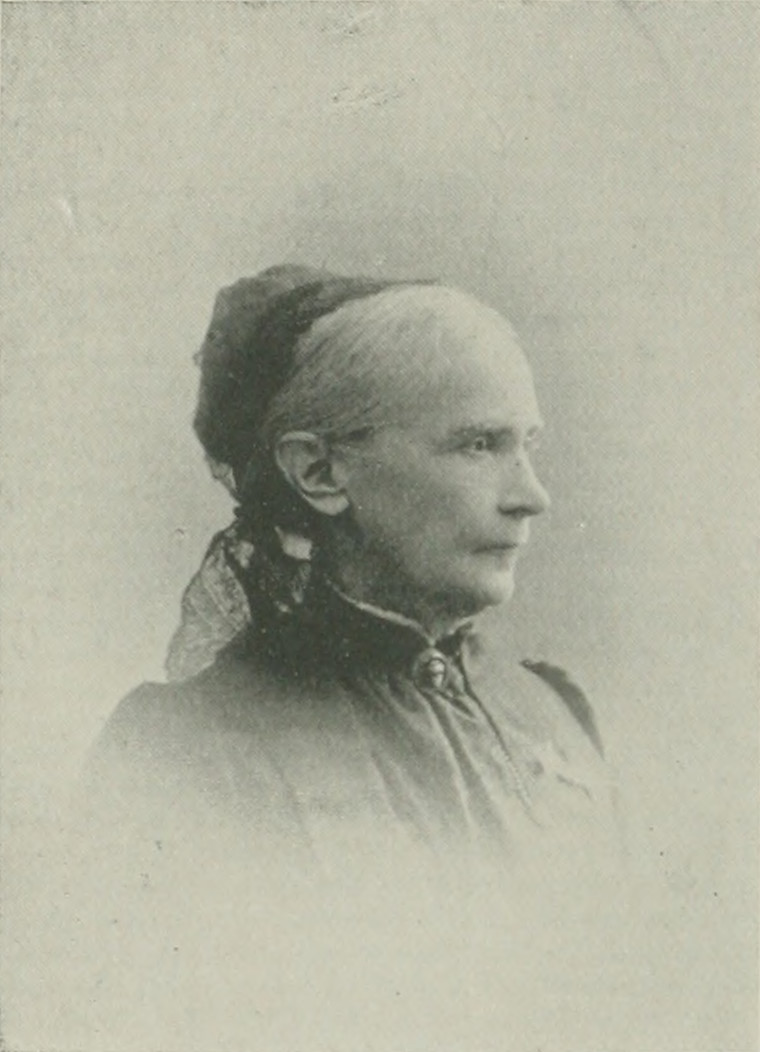
- Portrait photo from A Woman of the Century
- Born: Rhoda Anna Titus; November 22, 1819; Sempronius, New York, U.S.
- Died: 1894 (aged 74–75)
- Other names: pen name, "Ruth"
- Education: Groton Academy; Nine Partners Boarding School
- Occupations: philanthropist; temperance leader; writer
- Organization: Woman's Christian Temperance Union
- Spouse: Joseph Esmond (m. 1840)
- Children: 3

Rhoda A. Esmond (née Titus; pen name, Ruth; 1819–1894) was an American philanthropist, temperance leader, and writer. When the influence of the Women's Crusade (1873–74) reached Syracuse, New York where she was living, Esmond helped organize a woman's temperance society of 400 members; henceforth her life was devoted to the cause.

== Early life and education ==
Rhoda Anna Titus was born in Sempronius, New York, November 22, 1819. Her parents were Zadok Titus and Anna Hinkley Greenfield Titus, who were married in 1801. Zadok Titus was born in Stillwater, New York, and moved in 1795 to Sempronius, where he took up 177 acres (72 ha) of wild land, which he converted into a farm, upon which he lived until his death, in 1836.

Esmond's school-days, after leaving the district school, were spent for two years in Groton Academy and nearly a year in Nine Partners Boarding School in Washington, New York.

== Career ==
In Washington, New York, she met Joseph Esmond, a young Hicksite Friend, from Saratoga, New York, and they married May 5, 1840. They resided in Saratoga two years and then went to Milan, New York In 1846, they moved to Fulton, and Mr. Esmond took up the study of law. What he read through the day was reviewed with Mrs. Esmond at night. That gave her valuable legal knowledge and some acquaintance with the general rules of legal proceedings. In 1848, Mr. Esmond was admitted to the bar and practiced law in Fulton for 20 years, also serving as Justice of the Peace in 1864.

During those years, Esmond's health was very poor, but she was actively engaged in church work and often contributed articles to newspapers under the pen name "Ruth".

In 1872, the couple and their three sons, Richard, Zadok, and Frederick, moved to Syracuse, New York.

When the influence of the Women's Crusade (1873–74) reached Syracuse, Esmond, age 53, helped to organize a woman's temperance society of 400 members. Esmond was made a delegate to the first State Woman's Christian Temperance Union (WCTU) convention, held in Brooklyn, in February 1875, with instructions to visit all of the coffee-houses and friendly inns in Brooklyn, New York City, and Poughkeepsie to gather all the information possible for the purpose of formulating a plan for opening an inn in Syracuse. The inn was formally opened in July 1875. As chair of the inn committee, she successfully managed its affairs for nearly two years.

Jealousies arose in the union, leading Esmond and 32 others to resign and form a new union, called Syracuse WCTU No. 2. Esmond was elected president, but positively refused to act. In the first State WCTU convention held in Brooklyn, in February 1875, Esmond was made chair of the committee on resolutions and appointed one of a committee on "Memorial to the State Legislature". In the State's first annual convention held in Ilion, in October 1875, she was made a member of the executive board. In its second annual convention in Syracuse, in 1876, she gave the address of welcome, was made chair of the executive board, chosen a delegate to the National convention held in Newark, New Jersey and made a member of the State committee on visitations. In 1877, in the State annual convention, she was made chair of the finance committee and a member of the committee to revise the State constitution. In 1881, she was elected State superintendent of the department of unfermented wine. In 1887, she was elected a delegate to the National convention held in Nashville, Tennessee, but resigned. She was there appointed national superintendent of the department of unfermented wine. In 1888, she was delegate to the national convention, held in New York City. In 1889, she resigned the presidency of the local union, having held that office nearly six years. For the next four years, her efforts were given to the interest of her department work.
