= Moravia, New York =

- Town
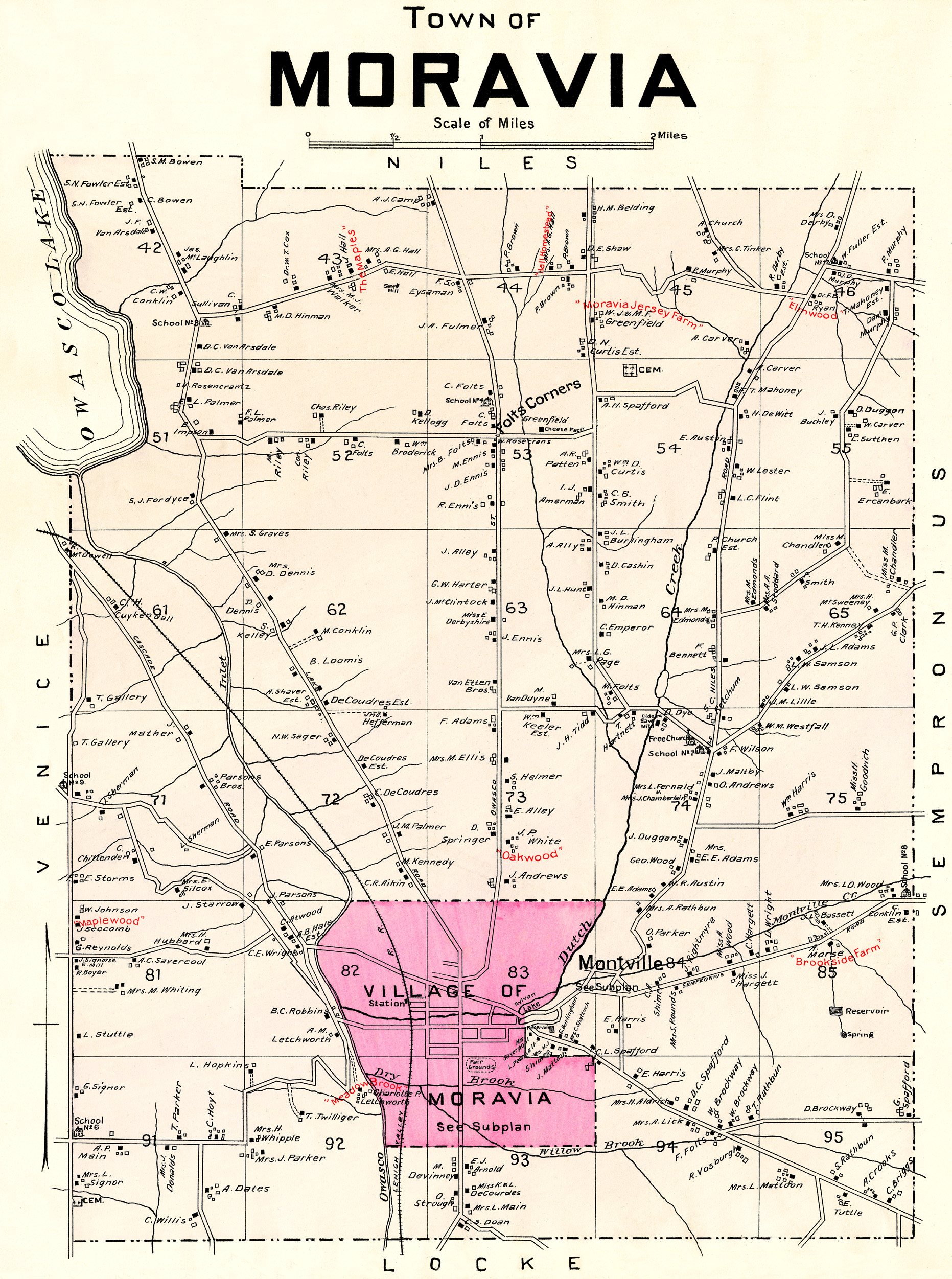
- Town of Moravia, NY with the village of Moravia highlighted, 1904

- Location within Cayuga County and New York
- Coordinates: 42°42′48″N 76°25′18″W
- Country: United States
- State: New York
- County: Cayuga

Government
  - Type: Town Council
  - Town Supervisor: Terrance Baxter (R)
  - Town Council: Members' List: • William Badman (R); • Teresa Palmer (D, • Wendy Fellows- Baxter (R); • Jeffrey E. Shea (R)

Area
  - Total: 29.64 sq mi (76.76 km^{2})
  - Land: 28.88 sq mi (74.81 km^{2})
  - Water: 0.75 sq mi (1.95 km^{2})
- Elevation: 745 ft (227 m)

Population (2010)
  - Total: 3,626
  - Estimate (2016): 3,500
  - Density: 121.2/sq mi (46.79/km^{2})
- Time zone: Eastern (EST)
- ZIP Codes: 13118 (Moravia); 13092 (Locke)
- FIPS code: 36-011-48307
- Website: www.cayugacounty.us/townofmoravia

Moravia is a town in Cayuga County, New York. The population was 3,626 at the time of the 2010 census.

The town of Moravia contains a village also called Moravia. The town is located in the Finger Lakes region, south of Auburn.

== History ==
Moravia was part of the Central New York Military Tract. The first settlers arrived around 1789, while the natives still lived in the area. The town was formed in 1833 from the town of Sempronius. Moravia was long known as the last bastion of the Whigs, the defunct political party of native ex-U.S. president Millard Fillmore. A few Whigs survived as late as the early 1980s according to voter registration records.

== Notable people ==
- Abigail Fillmore, First Lady of the United States
- Millard Fillmore, US president, born east of Moravia village and married in the village
- John D. Rockefeller, boyhood home of the American industrialist and wealthiest person in modern history
- John Wood, Illinois governor and founder of Quincy, Illinois

== Geography ==
According to the United States Census Bureau, the town has a total area of 29.7 square miles (76.8 km^{2}), of which 28.9 square miles (74.8 km^{2}) is land and 0.77 square miles (2.0 km^{2}), or 2.54%, is water.

Moravia is at the southern end of Owasco Lake, and the Owasco Inlet flows northward through the town to the lake. Mill Creek flows into the Owasco Inlet at Moravia village.

New York State Route 38 joins New York State Route 38A at Moravia village.

== Demographics ==
Historical population
Census	Pop.	Note	%±
1840	2,010		—
1850	1,876		−6.7%
1860	1,917		2.2%
1870	2,169		13.1%
1880	2,699		24.4%
1890	2,498		−7.4%
1900	2,373		−5.0%
1910	2,160		−9.0%
1920	2,066		−4.4%
1930	1,913		−7.4%
1940	1,910		−0.2%
1950	2,279		19.3%
1960	2,406		5.6%
1970	2,668		10.9%
1980	2,640		−1.0%
1990	3,871		46.6%
2000	4,041		4.4%
2010	3,626		−10.3%
2016 (est.)	3,500	▼	−3.5%
U.S. Decennial Census

As of the census of 2000, there were 4,040 people, 1,003 households, and 685 families residing in the town. The population density was 139.3 inhabitants per square mile (53.8/km^{2}). There were 1,198 housing units at an average density of 41.3 per square mile (15.9/km^{2}). The racial makeup of the town was 72.30% White, 21.39% Black or African American, 0.27% Native American, 0.27% Asian, 5.35% from other races, and 0.42% from two or more races. Hispanic or Latino of any race were 9.98% of the population.

There were 1,003 households, out of which 32.5% had children under the age of 18 living with them, 55.3% were married couples living together, 8.5% had a female householder with no husband present, and 31.7% were non-families. 24.7% of all households were made up of individuals, and 13.6% had someone living alone who was 65 years of age or older. The average household size was 2.53 and the average family size was 3.01.

In the town, the population was spread out, with 16.8% under the age of 18, 10.5% from 18 to 24, 42.9% from 25 to 44, 19.9% from 45 to 64, and 9.9% who were 65 years of age or older. The median age was 36 years. For every 100 females, there were 202.6 males. For every 100 females age 18 and over, there were 237.0 males.

The median income for a household in the town was $38,081, and the median income for a family was $43,493. Males had a median income of $32,919 versus $23,264 for females. The per capita income for the town was $16,847. About 5.5% of families and 8.7% of the population were below the poverty line, including 11.2% of those under age 18 and 5.4% of those age 65 or over.

== Communities and locations in the Town of Moravia ==
- Courtwright Corners – A location east of Southeast Owasco.
- Fillmore Glen State Park – A state park southeast of Moravia village.
- Four Town Corners – A location southeast of Owasco village at the eastern town line.
- Indian Grove – A location north of Southeast Owasco.
- Montville – A hamlet east of Moravia village. It was once a rival for prominence over Moravia village.
- Moravia – The village of Moravia is at the junction of NY-38 and NY-38A near the southern town line.
- Owasco Hill – A hamlet northwest of Owasco village at the town line.
- Perkins Corners – A location at the western town line, south of Owasco Hill.
- Southeast Owasco – A hamlet at the southern end of Owasco Lake.
- Toll Gate Corners – A hamlet at the southern town line, south of Moravia village.
- Wilson Corners – A hamlet northeast of Moravia village on NY-38A
