= New York State Route 41A =

State highway in central New York, US

New York State Route 41A
- Map of central New York with NY 41A highlighted in red

Route information
- Auxiliary route of NY 41
- Maintained by NYSDOT
- Length: 25.49 mi (41.02 km)
- Existed: 1930–present

Major junctions
- South end: NY 41 in Homer
- North end: US 20 in Skaneateles

Location
- Country: United States
- State: New York
- Counties: Cortland, Cayuga, Onondaga

Highway system
- New York Highways; Interstate; US; State; Reference; Parkways
← NY 41	→ NY 42

New York State Route 41A (NY 41A) is a north–south state highway in Central New York in the United States. It extends for 25.49 miles (41.02 km) from an intersection with NY 41 in the Cortland County town of Homer to a junction with U.S. Route 20 (US 20) in the Onondaga County village of Skaneateles. The southern half of NY 41A serves mostly rural areas, while the route's northern half runs along the western edge of Skaneateles Lake. NY 41A was assigned as part of the 1930 renumbering of state highways in New York to several previously unnumbered state roads and a section of pre-1930 NY 26.

== Route description ==
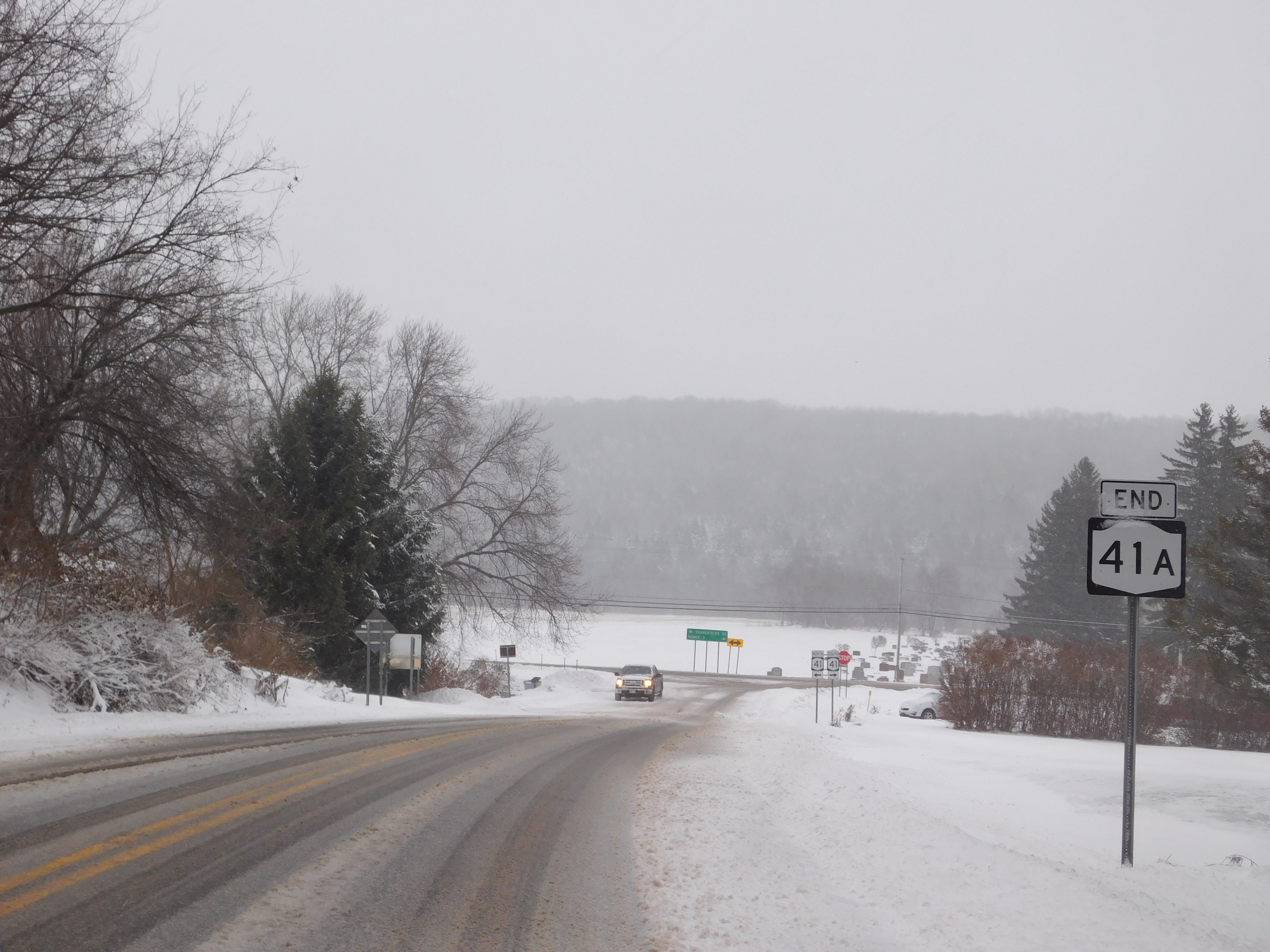
NY 41A southbound in Homer

NY 41A begins about 2 miles (3.2 km) north of the village of Homer at an intersection with NY 41 in the town of Homer. The two-lane route winds westward through a rural, wooded section of Homer, ascending in elevation before crossing the Cortland–Cayuga county line. Now in the town of Summerhill, NY 41A crosses an intersection with Atwood Road (unsigned County Route 81A or CR 81A) and Cutler School Road (CR 81C) in the hamlet of Como. After Como, the route bends northwest, crossing through the town of Summerhill past Lake Como and a junction with Branch Road (CR 103), where NY 41A turns northward.

The route starts winding north, crossing through the rural sections of Summerhill, before crossing a junction with Crofoot Road (CR 60) and into the town of Sempronius. The nature of the road does not change much through Sempronius, crossing a junction with the northern terminus of Atwood Road (CR 81A). About a mile to the north, NY 41A crosses into the hamlet of Sempronius, a small residential commune built around the junction with Phillips Road (CR 69A). Just north of the hamlet, NY 41A reaches a junction with Hartnett Road Spur, where it turns westward, to Reynolds Road, where it returns northward, crossing a junction with Sayles Corners Road (CR 63B).

The route bends northwest, paralleling Bear Swamp Creek through the town of Sempronius before bending north into the town of Niles. Just after crossing into the town of Niles, NY 41A crosses into the hamlet of New Hope, crossing a junction with New Hope Road and North Glen Haven Road (CR 66A). This junction serves as the center of New Hope, a residential community on this section of Cayuga County. Crossing north through Niles, NY 41A soon turns northwest as it approaches Skaneateles Lake, one of New York's Finger Lakes, running along the shoreline through the area, with a western turn at Amerman Road. At the northern terminus of Old Salt Road (CR 67), this process repeats itself, crossing into Onondaga County.

Now in the town of Skaneateles, NY 41A gains the name West Lake Road, running along Skaneateles Lake, intersecting the northern terminus of NY 359 (Lacy Road) at the lakeside hamlet of Mandana. Continuing north along the western shore of the lake, NY 41A crosses through Thornton Heights and Winding Ways and passes the Skaneateles Aerodrome. After crossing a junction with Benson Road (CR 117), NY 41A crosses through the Skaneateles Country Club and into the village of Skaneateles. Now known as Kane Avenue, NY 41A serves several residential blocks before ending at a junction with US 20 (West Genesee Street).

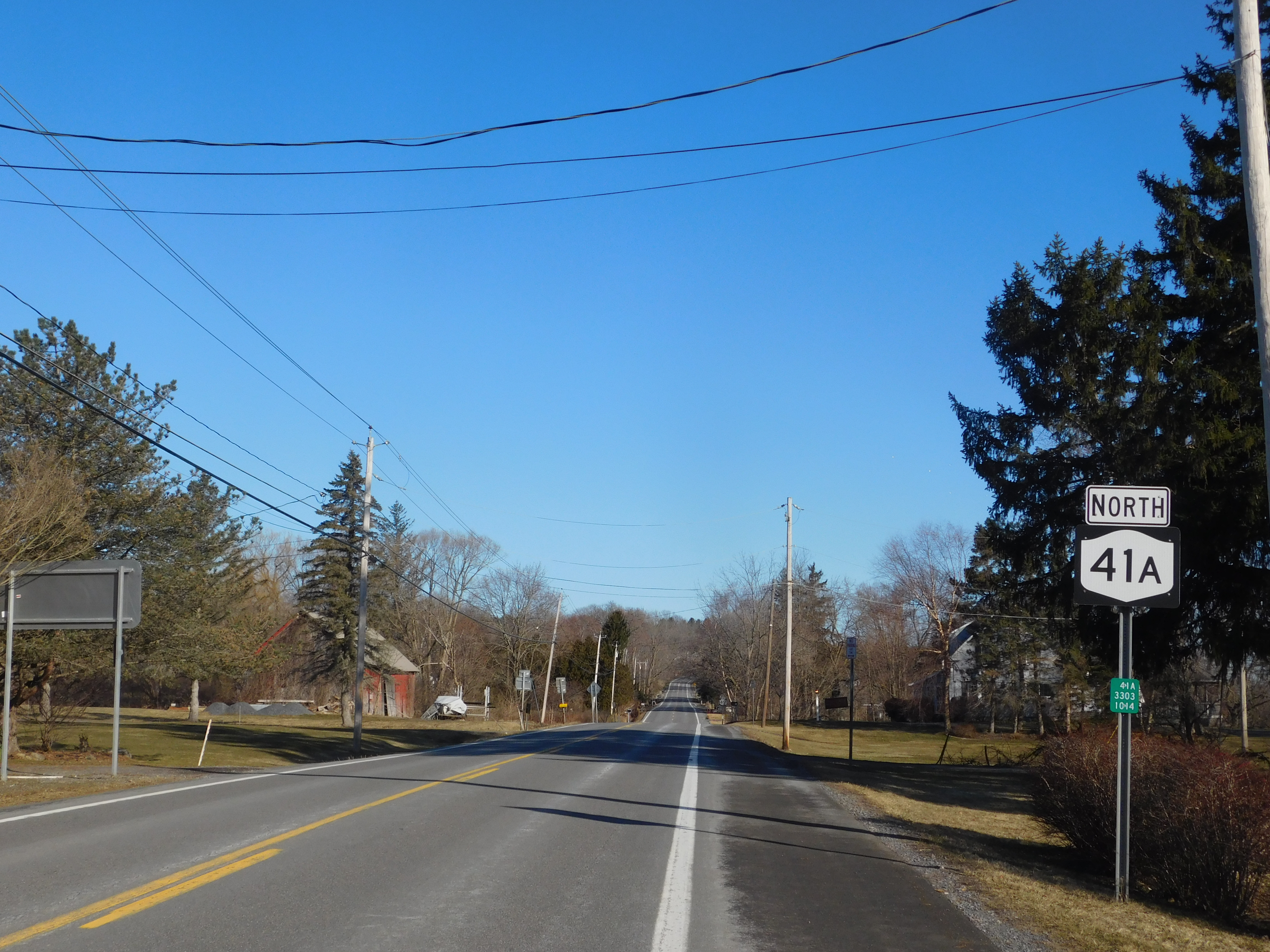
NY 41A northbound in Mandana

== History ==
The origins of NY 41A date back to November 29, 1901, when the state of New York awarded a contract to improve a 1-mile (1.6 km) segment of modern NY 41A south of the village of Skaneateles to state highway standards. The rebuilt road was added to the state highway system on December 23, 1902, as unsigned State Highway 48 (SH 48). A later contract, let on July 10, 1906, reconstructed the mile of road directly south of SH 48, while another named on November 10 of that year focused on the 0.5-mile (0.80 km) stretch leading south from the Skaneateles village line and the section of road between the south end of the July project's scope and Mandana. The highway improved by the former was accepted into the state highway system on December 8, 1909, as SH 292; the latter was included on December 13, 1908, as SH 486.

On January 30, 1914, the state awarded a contract to rebuild two highways leading away from SH 486 in Mandana, one heading generally southwestward for 1.7 miles (2.7 km) and another traveling southeast to the Cayuga–Onondaga county line. Both were added to the state highway system on June 18, 1915, as SH 1068. In 1924, the southwestern leg of SH 1068 became part of NY 26, an Ithaca–Syracuse route which continued north to Skaneateles by way of SH 486, SH 292, and SH 48. The southeast leg of SH 1068 did not receive a posted route number as it did not connect to any state roads at its south end. Over the course of the next few years, however, the state turned the stub into a connecting route by acquiring a highway running from the county line southeast to New Hope by 1926 and a series of roads linking New Hope, Sempronius, and Como to NY 70 (now NY 41) in Homer by 1929.

In the 1930 renumbering of state highways in New York, several existing routes were reconfigured and hundreds of previously unsigned state highways were given posted designations for the first time. The NY 26 designation was reassigned to another road in east-central New York, leaving the highway's former routing to be included in parts of other routes. From Mandana to Skaneateles, old NY 26 became the northernmost part of NY 41A, a new highway continuing southeast to Homer by way of the previously unnumbered Mandana–Homer state highway.

== Major intersections ==
County	Location	mi	km	Destinations	Notes
Cortland	Town of Homer	0.00	0.00	NY 41 – Skaneateles, Homer	Southern terminus
Onondaga	Town of Skaneateles	19.66	31.64	NY 359 south (Lacy Road) – Auburn	Northern terminus of NY 359; hamlet of Mandana
Onondaga	Village of Skaneateles	25.49	41.02	US 20 (West Genesee Street) – Auburn, LaFayette, Cazenovia	Northern terminus
1.000 mi = 1.609 km; 1.000 km = 0.621 mi
