= Moravia (village), New York =

Moravia, New York
- Village
- Location within the state of New York
- Coordinates: 42°42′40″N 76°25′23″W
- Country: United States
- State: New York
- County: Cayuga
- Town: Moravia

Area
  - Total: 1.73 sq mi (4.47 km^{2})
  - Land: 1.70 sq mi (4.41 km^{2})
  - Water: 0.023 sq mi (0.06 km^{2})
- Elevation: 735 ft (224 m)

Population (2020)
  - Total: 1,224
  - Density: 718.7/sq mi (277.48/km^{2})
- Time zone: UTC-5 (Eastern (EST))
  - Summer (DST): UTC-4 (EDT)
- ZIP code: 13118
- Area code: 315
- FIPS code: 36-48296
- GNIS feature ID: 0957642
- Website: www.villageofmoravia.com

The village of Moravia in Cayuga County, New York, United States is a community with population of about 1,200. The village of Moravia is in the southern part of the town of Moravia and is south of Auburn.

Nearby Fillmore Glen State Park contains a replica of the cabin in which President Millard Fillmore was born.

== History ==
The village was in the Central New York Military Tract and is on the site of a former native village.

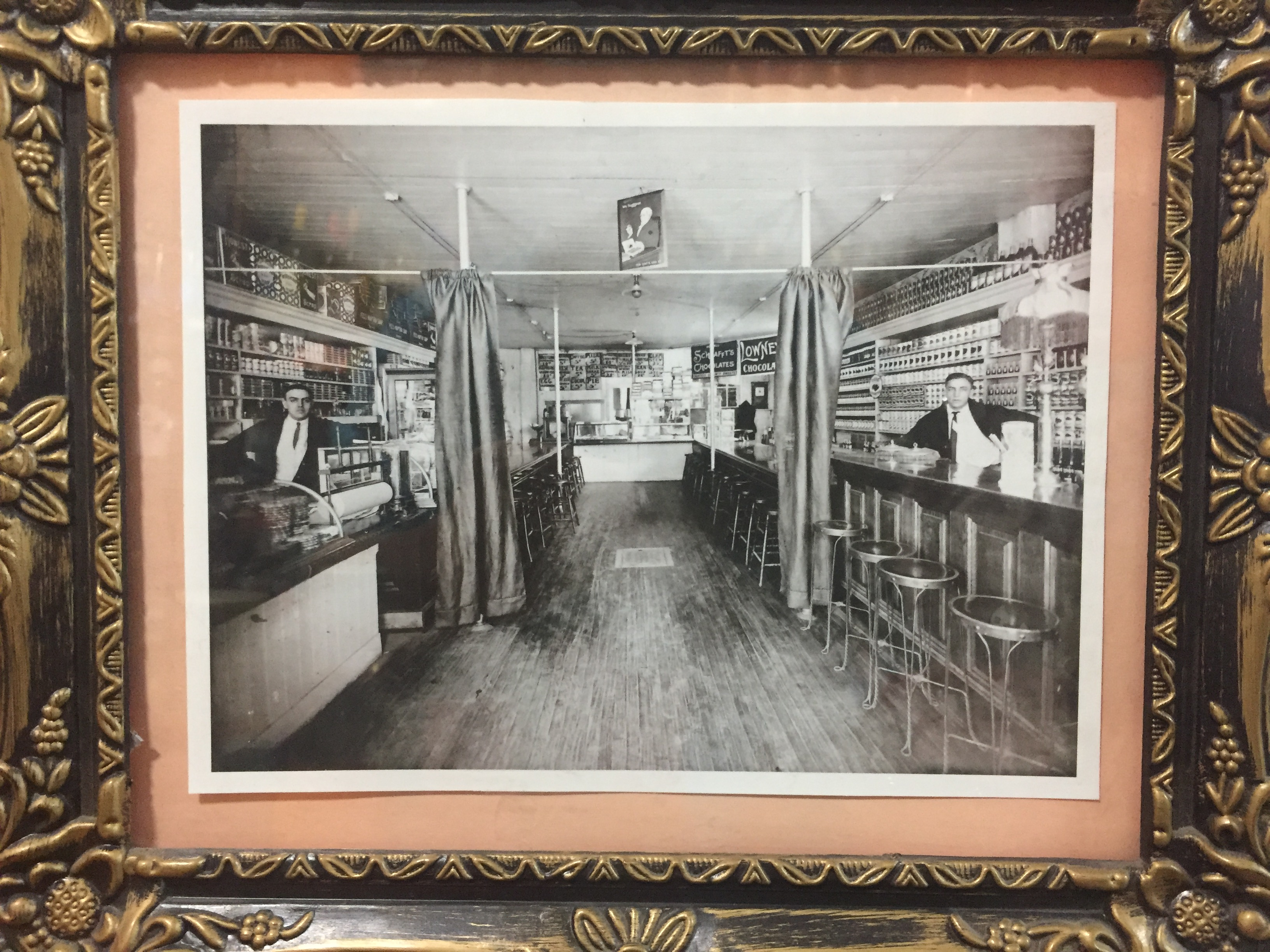
Historic interior of store at Aurora and S. Main Streets, now Moravia Liquors

Moravia village was founded in 1789 by John Stoyell, a veteran. It was then called "Owasco Flats". The village of Moravia was incorporated in 1837 and re-incorporated in 1859 when enlarged.

The Powers Library, erected in 1880, is the oldest continuously used library in New York.

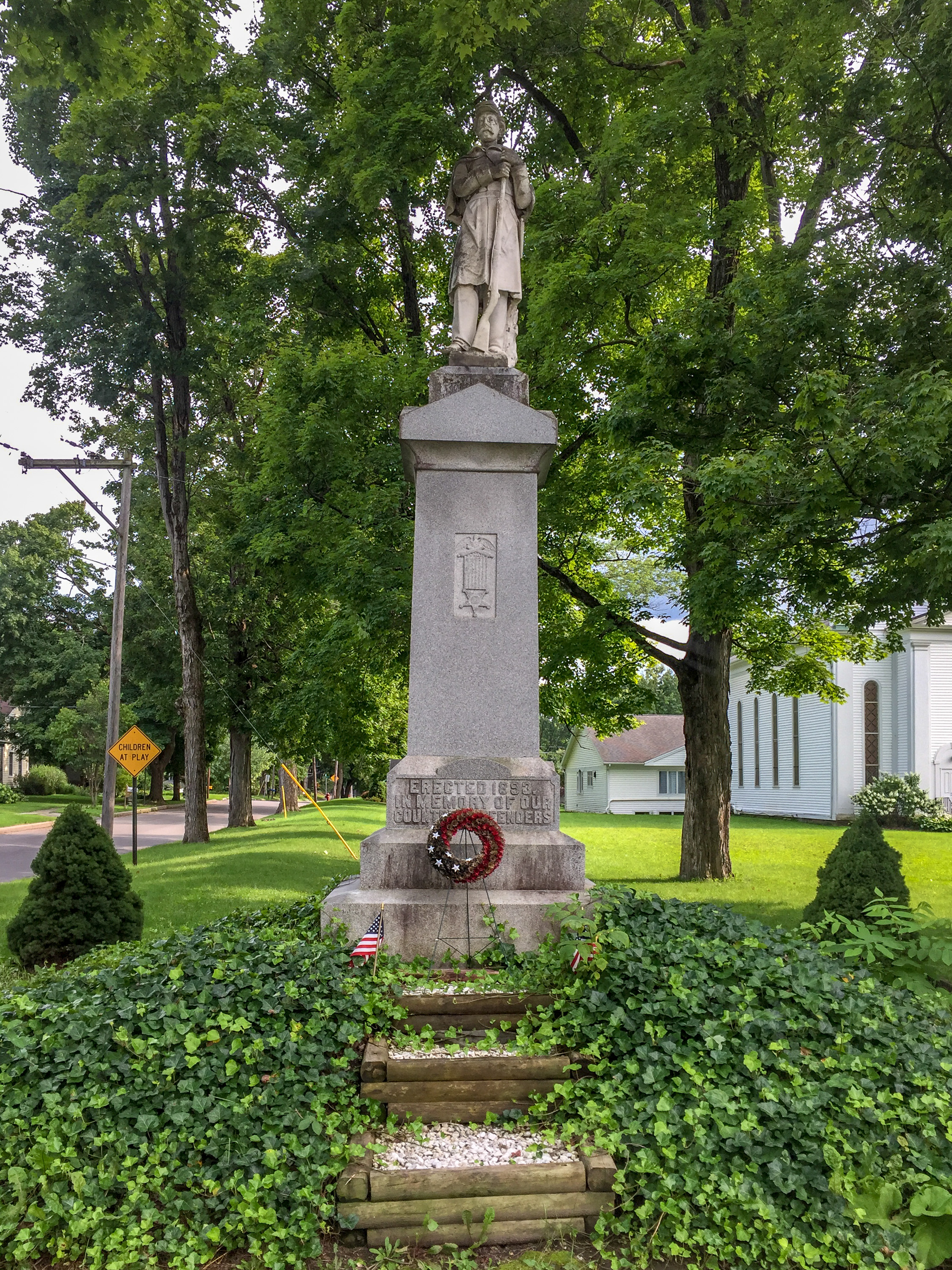
Civil War memorial in Moravia

Dozens of Italianate houses built in the late 1800s, plus many other residences, churches, a cemetery, and other properties in the village are documented, and are listed on the National Register of Historic Places either as individual buildings or within historic districts: see National Register of Historic Places listings in Cayuga County, New York.

The village population was 1,282 at the 2010 census.

== Notable people ==
- Millard Fillmore was born in the village.
- John D. Rockefeller, boyhood home of the future industrialist
- Andrew Dickson White, educator and president of Cornell University

== Geography ==
Moravia is located at 42°42′39″N 76°25′22″W (42.711108, -76.42302).

According to the United States Census Bureau, the village has a total area of 1.73 square miles (4.47 km^{2}), of which 1.70 square miles (4.41 km^{2}) is land and 0.02 square miles (0.06 km^{2}), or 1.24%, is water.

The village is south of Owasco Lake, and the Owasco Inlet flows through the village.

New York State Route 38 intersects New York State Route 38A in Moravia village.

== Demographics ==
Historical population
Census	Pop.	Note	%±
1880	1,540		—
1890	1,486		−3.5%
1900	1,442		−3.0%
1910	1,324		−8.2%
1920	1,331		0.5%
1930	1,295		−2.7%
1940	1,231		−4.9%
1950	1,480		20.2%
1960	1,575		6.4%
1970	1,642		4.3%
1980	1,582		−3.7%
1990	1,559		−1.5%
2000	1,363		−12.6%
2010	1,282		−5.9%
2020	1,224		−4.5%
U.S. Decennial Census

As of the census of 2000, there were 1,363 people, 542 households, and 338 families residing in the village. The population density was 793.0 inhabitants per square mile (306.2/km^{2}). There were 592 housing units at an average density of 344.4 per square mile (133.0/km^{2}). The racial makeup of the village was 98.39% White, 0.29% Black or African American, 0.15% Native American, 0.29% Asian, and 0.88% from two or more races. Hispanic or Latino of any race were 0.37% of the population.

There were 542 households, out of which 32.7% had children under the age of 18 living with them, 46.9% were married couples living together, 10.7% had a female householder with no husband present, and 37.5% were non-families. 30.3% of all households were made up of individuals, and 18.3% had someone living alone who was 65 years of age or older. The average household size was 2.45 and the average family size was 3.05.

In the village, the population was spread out, with 27.4% under the age of 18, 6.5% from 18 to 24, 25.7% from 25 to 44, 22.4% from 45 to 64, and 18.0% who were 65 years of age or older. The median age was 38 years. For every 100 females, there were 85.9 males. For every 100 females age 18 and over, there were 81.5 males.

The median income for a household in the village was $33,864, and the median income for a family was $41,513. Males had a median income of $30,625 versus $23,264 for females. The per capita income for the village was $16,447. About 4.8% of families and 9.2% of the population were below the poverty line, including 11.4% of those under age 18 and 6.6% of those age 65 or over.

== Education ==
It is in the Moravia Central School District.

== See also ==
- National Register of Historic Places listings in Cayuga County, New York
