= Melrose Park, New York =

- Census-designated place
- Location within New York Location within the United States
- Coordinates: 42°54′43″N 76°32′18″W
- Country: United States
- State: New York
- County: Cayuga
- Town: Owasco

Area
  - Total: 4.32 sq mi (11.18 km^{2})
  - Land: 3.73 sq mi (9.66 km^{2})
  - Water: 0.58 sq mi (1.51 km^{2})
- Elevation: 732 ft (223 m)

Population (2020)
  - Total: 2,141
  - Density: 573.8/sq mi (221.53/km^{2})
- Time zone: UTC-5 (Eastern (EST))
  - Summer (DST): UTC-4 (EDT)
- ZIP Code: 13021 (Auburn)
- FIPS code: 36-46503
- GNIS feature ID: 0956930

Melrose Park is a suburban community and census-designated place (CDP) in Cayuga County, New York, United States. As of the 2020 census, Melrose Park had a population of 2,141. It is a suburb of Auburn, located south of the city in the town of Owasco.

== Geography ==
Melrose Park is located in the northwest corner of Owasco at 42°54′43″N 76°32′18″W (42.912071, -76.538289).

According to the United States Census Bureau, the CDP has a total area of 4.3 square miles (11.2 km^{2}), of which 3.7 square miles (9.7 km^{2}) is land and 0.58 square miles (1.5 km^{2}), or 13.54%, is water.

== Demographics ==
Historical population
Census	Pop.	Note	%±
2020	2,141		—
U.S. Decennial Census

=== 2020 census ===
As of the 2020 census, Melrose Park had a population of 2,141. The median age was 49.6 years. 16.8% of residents were under the age of 18 and 22.2% of residents were 65 years of age or older. For every 100 females there were 96.4 males, and for every 100 females age 18 and over there were 95.4 males age 18 and over.

96.1% of residents lived in urban areas, while 3.9% lived in rural areas.

There were 932 households in Melrose Park, of which 24.2% had children under the age of 18 living in them. Of all households, 56.3% were married-couple households, 14.5% were households with a male householder and no spouse or partner present, and 21.0% were households with a female householder and no spouse or partner present. About 25.7% of all households were made up of individuals and 13.9% had someone living alone who was 65 years of age or older.

There were 997 housing units, of which 6.5% were vacant. The homeowner vacancy rate was 1.3% and the rental vacancy rate was 7.6%.

Racial composition as of the 2020 census
Race	Number	Percent
White	2,047	95.6%
Black or African American	10	0.5%
American Indian and Alaska Native	2	0.1%
Asian	7	0.3%
Native Hawaiian and Other Pacific Islander	1	0.0%
Some other race	14	0.7%
Two or more races	60	2.8%
Hispanic or Latino (of any race)	48	2.2%

=== 2000 census ===
As of the census of 2000, there were 2,359 people, 908 households, and 698 families residing in the CDP. The population density was 630.1 inhabitants per square mile (243.3/km^{2}). There were 931 housing units at an average density of 248.7 per square mile (96.0/km^{2}). The racial makeup of the CDP was 98.73% White, 0.13% African American, 0.68% Asian, 0.13% from other races, and 0.34% from two or more races. Hispanic or Latino of any race were 0.42% of the population.

There were 908 households, out of which 35.7% had children under the age of 18 living with them, 66.6% were married couples living together, 7.4% had a female householder with no husband present, and 23.1% were non-families. 20.8% of all households were made up of individuals, and 12.1% had someone living alone who was 65 years of age or older. The average household size was 2.59 and the average family size was 2.99.

In the CDP, the population was spread out, with 25.6% under the age of 18, 5.5% from 18 to 24, 26.5% from 25 to 44, 25.9% from 45 to 64, and 16.6% who were 65 years of age or older. The median age was 41 years. For every 100 females, there were 95.6 males. For every 100 females age 18 and over, there were 91.6 males.

The median income for a household in the CDP was $51,600, and the median income for a family was $60,000. Males had a median income of $42,857 versus $28,472 for females. The per capita income for the CDP was $22,724. About 1.2% of families and 3.4% of the population were below the poverty line, including 2.3% of those under age 18 and 2.8% of those age 65 or over.

== Education ==
It is in the Auburn Enlarged City School District.
