= Jack's Reef, New York =

- hamlet
- Location within the state of New York
- Coordinates: 43°6′23″N 76°25′56″W
- Country: United States
- State: New York
- County: Onondaga
- Time zone: UTC-5 (Eastern (EST))
  - Summer (DST): UTC-4 (EDT)
- ZIP codes: 13112
- Area code: 315

Jack's Reef is a hamlet in the Town of Van Buren, New York in Onondaga County, United States. It was developed around an inn where Old Route 31 (supplanted by modern NY Route 31) bent around a large oxbow in the Seneca River. Subsequently, a canal was cut approximately one mile to the north, which shortened the navigation route. Consequently, Jack's Reef lost virtually all commercial and much recreational traffic. The nearby Seneca River still attracted summer residents, however. Today year-round homes are being built nearby, as the hamlet is within commuting range of Syracuse.

An archeological site was first excavated in Jack's Reef beginning in the 1930s. Artifacts found date to the Middle Woodland period.

== See also ==
- Jack's Reef pentagonal projectile point
