= Village Green, New York =

- Census-designated place
- Location in Onondaga County and the state of New York.
- Coordinates: 43°7′54″N 76°18′31″W
- Country: United States
- State: New York
- County: Onondaga

Area
  - Total: 1.16 sq mi (3.01 km^{2})
  - Land: 1.15 sq mi (2.99 km^{2})
  - Water: 0.0077 sq mi (0.02 km^{2})
- Elevation: 440 ft (134 m)

Population (2020)
  - Total: 3,834
  - Density: 3,322.5/sq mi (1,282.84/km^{2})
- Time zone: UTC-5 (Eastern (EST))
  - Summer (DST): UTC-4 (EDT)
- FIPS code: 36-77513
- GNIS feature ID: 1867421

Village Green is a hamlet (and census-designated place) in Onondaga County, New York, United States. As of the 2020 census, Village Green had a population of 3,834.

Village Green is in the eastern part of the town of Van Buren.

== Geography ==
Village Green is located at 43°7′54″N 76°18′31″W (43.131717, -76.308592).

According to the United States Census Bureau, the region has a total area of 1.2 square miles (3.1 km^{2}), all land.

The village is south of the Seneca River and southeast of Baldwinsville.

Most of the community is between Interstate 690 and New York State Route 48.

== Demographics ==
Historical population
Census	Pop.	Note	%±
2020	3,834		—
U.S. Decennial Census

=== 2020 census ===
As of the 2020 census, Village Green had a population of 3,834. The median age was 41.4 years. 15.2% of residents were under the age of 18 and 20.0% of residents were 65 years of age or older. For every 100 females there were 90.7 males, and for every 100 females age 18 and over there were 88.7 males age 18 and over.

100.0% of residents lived in urban areas, while 0.0% lived in rural areas.

There were 2,027 households in Village Green, of which 18.9% had children under the age of 18 living in them. Of all households, 30.0% were married-couple households, 24.3% were households with a male householder and no spouse or partner present, and 35.6% were households with a female householder and no spouse or partner present. About 43.9% of all households were made up of individuals and 16.6% had someone living alone who was 65 years of age or older.

There were 2,118 housing units, of which 4.3% were vacant. The homeowner vacancy rate was 1.0% and the rental vacancy rate was 2.6%.

Racial composition as of the 2020 census
Race	Number	Percent
White	3,457	90.2%
Black or African American	91	2.4%
American Indian and Alaska Native	28	0.7%
Asian	26	0.7%
Native Hawaiian and Other Pacific Islander	3	0.1%
Some other race	23	0.6%
Two or more races	206	5.4%
Hispanic or Latino (of any race)	124	3.2%

=== 2000 census ===
As of the census of 2000, there were 3,945 people, 1,896 households, and 1,033 families residing in the community. The population density was 3,227.6 inhabitants per square mile (1,246.2/km^{2}). There were 2,053 housing units at an average density of 1,679.7 per square mile (648.5/km^{2}). The racial makeup of the CDP was 96.76% White, 1.04% African American, 0.23% Native American, 0.74% Asian, 0.33% from other races, and 0.91% from two or more races. Hispanic or Latino of any race were 1.14% of the population.

There were 1,896 households, out of which 24.2% had children under the age of 18 living with them, 41.7% were married couples living together, 9.8% had a female householder with no husband present, and 45.5% were non-families. 38.4% of all households were made up of individuals, and 10.0% had someone living alone who was 65 years of age or older. The average household size was 2.08 and the average family size was 2.78.

In the CDP, the population was spread out, with 20.9% under the age of 18, 6.3% from 18 to 24, 35.2% from 25 to 44, 25.1% from 45 to 64, and 12.4% who were 65 years of age or older. The median age was 38 years. For every 100 females, there were 88.8 males. For every 100 females age 18 and over, there were 86.7 males.

The median income for a household in the CDP was $43,243, and the median income for a family was $50,278. Males had a median income of $36,686 versus $29,519 for females. The per capita income for the CDP was $23,559. About 5.9% of families and 6.2% of the population were below the poverty line, including 9.8% of those under age 18 and 6.1% of those age 65 or over.

== Education ==
It is within the Baldwinsville Central School District.
