= Centreport =

Centreport may refer to:

- CentrePort Wellington, the port company of the port in Wellington, New Zealand.
- CentrePort Canada, an inland port in Winnipeg and Rosser, Manitoba, Canada.
- Centreport Aqueduct, a historic aqueduct in Cayuga County, New York.
- CentrePort/DFW Airport Station, a Trinity Railway Express commuter rail station just south of Dallas/Fort Worth International Airport.

== See also ==
- Centerport (disambiguation)
