= Muskrat Creek =

Location
- Country: United States
- State: New York

Physical characteristics
- Mouth: Seneca River
  - location: Weedsport, New York, United States
  - coordinates: 43°04′19″N 76°33′10″W
- Basin size: 24.6 mi^{2} (64 km^{2})

Muskrat Creek is a creek that flows into the Seneca River by Weedsport, New York.
