= Charles W. Baker High School =

Location
- 29 East Oneida St; Baldwinsville, New York 13027; United States; 43.1642°N 76.3330°W

Information
- Type: Public
- Opened: 1952
- School district: Baldwinsville Central School District
- NCES School ID: 360387000140
- Principal: Jennifer Terpening
- Teaching staff: 78.40 (on an FTE basis)
- Grades: 10-12
- Enrollment: 1,269 (2023-2024)
- Student to teacher ratio: 16.19
- Campus: Suburban: large
- Colors: Red and white
- Nickname: Bees
- Yearbook: Lyre
- Website: baker.bville.org

Charles W. Baker High School is a public high school located in Baldwinsville, Onondaga County, New York, United States. It is the only high school operated by the Baldwinsville Central School District.

The school was named after Charles Winston Baker.

== History ==
During the 1950's, the combination of schools in the towns of Lysander and Van Buren took place, creating the Baldwinsville Central School District. Baldwinsville Academy and Central School originally opened in 1952 on Elizabeth Street, before shortly after moving to a new building on East Oneida Street, which would be named in honor of Charles W. Baker.

== Notable alumni ==
- Scott Blewett (born 1996), baseball player for the Minnesota Twins
- Alex Bono (born 1994), soccer player
- Jason Grilli (born 1976), baseball player
- Daryl Metcalfe (born 1962), politician who was a member of the Pennsylvania House of Representatives
- Jazmyn Nyx (born 1998), professional wrestler
- Don Paige (born 1956), former middle-distance runner who placed first at the 1979 Pan American Games
- JJ Starling (born 2004), basketball player for the Syracuse Orange
