= Seneca River Crossing Canals Historic District =

Historic district in New York, United States

- U.S. National Register of Historic Places
- U.S. Historic district
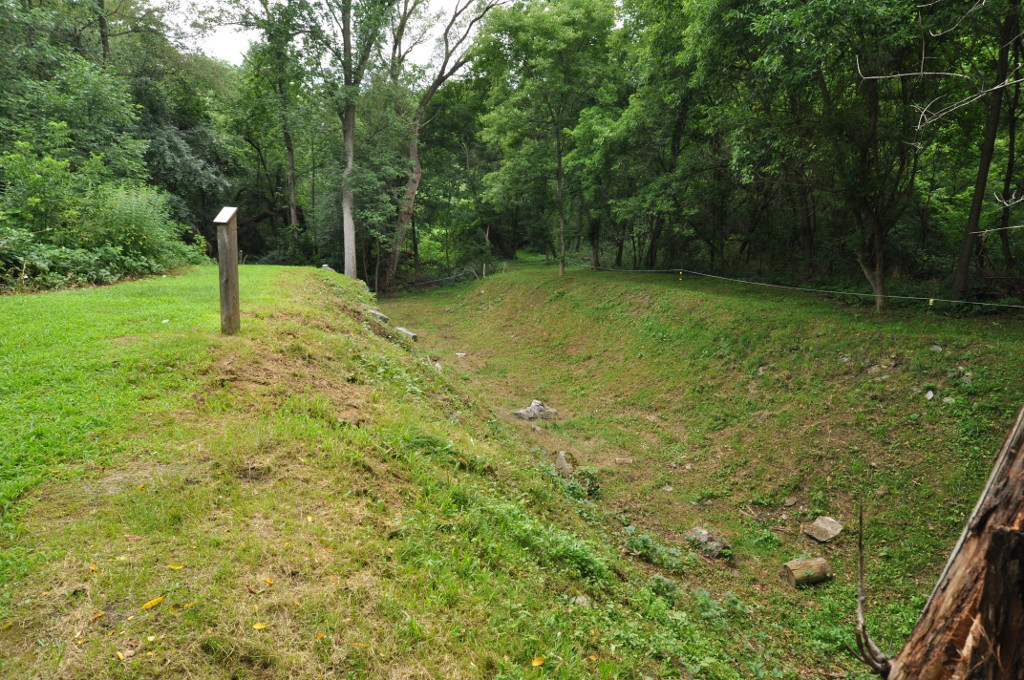
- A portion of the original 1820s canal ditch

- Location within New York Location within the United States
- Nearest city: Montezuma and Tyre, New York
- Coordinates: 43°0′32″N 76°42′45″W
- Area: 70 acres (28 ha)
- Built: 1817
- Architect: Richmond, Van Rensselaer
- NRHP reference No.: 05001397
- Added to NRHP: December 09, 2005

Seneca River Crossing Canals Historic District is a national historic district located at Montezuma and Tyre in Cayuga and Seneca Counties, New York. The district includes more than a mile of the Enlarged Erie Canal prism (built here between 1849 and 1857); towpath and heelpath; a drydock; the remains of the Richmond (Montezuma) Aqueduct crossing the Seneca River; remnants of the original Erie Canal, built between 1817 and 1825 and including Lock #62 and piers of the original mule bridge from that era; and a culvert that carries a stream beneath the Enlarged Erie Canal.

It was listed on the National Register of Historic Places in 2005.
