= Crusoe Creek =

Location
- Country: United States
- State: New York

Physical characteristics
- Source: Crusoe Lake
- Mouth: Seneca River
  - location: Montezuma Station, New York, United States
  - coordinates: 43°03′42″N 76°43′06″W
- Basin size: 49.5 mi^{2} (128 km^{2})

Crusoe Creek is a river located in Wayne County, New York. It flows into Seneca River by Montezuma Station, New York.
