= Crego =

Crego may refer to:

- Crego (surname), surname
- Crego Park, park
- Mrs. I. L. Crego House, historic house in Baldwinsville, New York, United States of America
