= JJ Starling =

American basketball player (born 2004)

No. 2 – Buffalo Bulls
- Position: Point guard / shooting guard
- Conference: Mid-American Conference

Personal information
- Born: March 16, 2004 (age 22) Syracuse, New York, U.S.
- Listed height: 6 ft 4 in (1.93 m)
- Listed weight: 206 lb (93 kg)

Career information
- High school: Charles W. Baker (Baldwinsville, New York); La Lumiere School (La Porte, Indiana)
- College: Notre Dame (2022–2023); Syracuse (2023–2026); Buffalo (2026–present)

Career highlights
- ACC All-Freshman team (2023); McDonald's All-American (2022)

Jonathan Eric "JJ" Starling (born March 16, 2004) is an American college basketball player for the Buffalo Bulls of the Mid-American Conference (MAC). He previously played for the Notre Dame Fighting Irish and Syracuse Orange.

== Early life and high school career ==
Starling grew up in Baldwinsville, New York and initially attended Charles W. Baker High School. As a sophomore, he averaged 28.6 points, 6.2 rebounds, and 1.8 assists per game and set the school's scoring record during his sophomore season. Following the end of the school year, Starling transferred to La Lumiere School in La Porte, Indiana. As a senior, Starling played in the Jordan Brand Classic and the McDonald's All-American Game.

=== Recruiting ===
Starling was a consensus five-star recruit and one of the top players in the 2022 class, according to major recruiting services. On October 12, 2021, he committed to playing college basketball for Notre Dame over offers from Duke, Northwestern, Stanford, and Syracuse. He was the highest-rated player to commit to Notre Dame since Demetrius Jackson in 2013.

College recruiting
Name	Hometown	School	Height	Weight	Commit date
JJ Starling; PG / SG	Baldwinsville, NY	La Lumiere School (IN)	6 ft 4 in (1.93 m)	180 lb (82 kg)	Oct 12, 2021
JJ Starling; PG / SG	Recruit ratings: Rivals: 247Sports: ESPN: (91)				
Overall recruit ranking: Rivals: 22 247Sports: 22 ESPN: 19
Note: In many cases, Scout, Rivals, 247Sports, On3, and ESPN may conflict in their listings of height and weight.; In these cases, the average was taken. ESPN grades are on a 100-point scale.; Sources: "Notre Dame 2022 Basketball Commitments". Rivals.; "2022 Notre Dame Fighting Irish Recruiting Class". ESPN.; "2022 Team Ranking". Rivals.

== College career ==
=== Notre Dame ===
Starling enrolled at Notre Dame shortly after graduating high school and took part in the Fighting Irish's summer practices. He entered his freshman season as a potential first-round selection in the 2023 NBA draft. Starling averaged 11.2 points per game and was named the Atlantic Coast Conference (ACC) All-Freshman team. At the end of the season, he entered the NCAA transfer portal while also announcing that he would not be entering the 2023 NBA draft.

=== Syracuse ===
Starling committed to transfer to Syracuse. Starling scored over 1,500 career points, of which more than 1,000 were in at Syracuse.

=== Buffalo ===
On September 3, 2026, Starling signed to play at Buffalo. He was granted a temporary restraining order against the NCAA and as a result granted a fifth season of eligibility after filing a lawsuit in the state of California.

== Career statistics ==
Legend
GP	Games played	GS	Games started	MPG	Minutes per game
FG%	Field goal percentage	3P%	3-point field goal percentage	FT%	Free throw percentage
RPG	Rebounds per game	APG	Assists per game	SPG	Steals per game
BPG	Blocks per game	PPG	Points per game	**Bold**	Career high

=== College ===
Year	Team	GP	GS	MPG	FG%	3P%	FT%	RPG	APG	SPG	BPG	PPG
2022–23	Notre Dame	28	24	29.7	.421	.299	.638	2.8	1.1	0.7	0.2	11.2
2023–24	Syracuse	**32**	**32**	34.4	**.458**	**.324**	**.714**	3.2	1.9	0.8	0.2	13.3
2024–25	Syracuse	26	26	**34.6**	.407	.268	.685	**3.8**	**2.8**	**0.9**	**0.3**	**17.8**
2025–26	Syracuse	30	30	29.0	.419	.289	.548	2.7	2.4	**0.9**	0.2	10.9
**Career**		**116**	**112**	**31.9**	**.426**	**.295**	**.653**	**3.1**	**2.0**	**0.8**	**0.2**	**13.2**
