= Baldwinsville Central School District =

School district in New York, United States

Baldwinsville Central School District is a public school district serving the Baldwinsville, New York community. The superintendent is Joseph M. DeBarbieri. The district office address is 29 East Oneida Street Baldwinsville, NY 13027. It consists of 6,036 students in eight schools in this grade span (five K–5 elementary schools, one 6–7 middle school, one 8–9 junior high school, and one 10–12 senior high school).

The district includes the Village of Baldwinsville and the Radisson, Seneca Knolls, and Village Green census-designated places. The district takes most of Lysander and Van Buren towns, as well as a section of Clay Town.

== Schools ==
=== Elementary (K-5) ===
- Harry E. Elden Elementary School
  - Principal: Thomas Coughlin
- Martin Van Buren Elementary School
  - Principal: Cynthia Cronin
- Catherine M. McNamara Elementary School
  - Principal: Melinda Howard
- Mae E. Reynolds Elementary School
  - Principal: Melissa Chiodo
- L. Pearl Palmer Elementary School
  - Principal: Alex Ewing

=== Middle (6-7) ===
- Donald S. Ray Middle School
  - Principal: Michael Pope

=== Junior High (8-9) ===
- Theodore R. Durgee Junior High School
  - Principal: Thomas Fraher

=== Senior High (10-12) ===
- Charles W. Baker High School
  - Principal: Kris Denton
