= Conquest, New York =

- Town
- Location within Cayuga County and the state of New York

- Location within New York Location within the United States
- Coordinates: 43°6′32″N 76°39′13″W
- Country: United States
- State: New York
- County: Cayuga

Government
  - Type: Town Council
  - Town Supervisor: Charles M. Knapp (D)
  - Town Council: Members' List: • Ed Cook (D); • Thomas R. Kincaid (D); • Janice E. Moore (R); • Dorothy A. Watts (R)

Area
  - Total: 36.32 sq mi (94.06 km^{2})
  - Land: 35.22 sq mi (91.22 km^{2})
  - Water: 1.10 sq mi (2.84 km^{2})
- Elevation: 420 ft (128 m)

Population (2020)
  - Total: 1,796 ▼
  - Estimate (2021): 1,788
  - Density: 49.5/sq mi (19.13/km^{2})
- Time zone: UTC-5 (Eastern (EST))
  - Summer (DST): UTC-4 (EDT)
- ZIP Codes: 13140 (Port Byron); 13033 (Cato); 13143 (Red Creek); 13166 (Weedsport)
- Area code: 315
- FIPS code: 36-011-17849
- GNIS feature ID: 0978862
- Website: Town website

Conquest is a town in Cayuga County, New York, United States. The population was 1,796 at the 2020 census. The name was chosen to mark the victory of those who wished to form the town. Conquest is on the western border of Cayuga County and is west of Syracuse.

== History ==
Conquest was part of the Central New York Military Tract. The area of the town was first settled circa 1800. The town of Conquest was formed in 1821 from the town of Cato after a contentious dispute about whether to form the new town. The town of Victory was formed at the same time and given a name to celebrate the outcome.

== Geography ==
According to the United States Census Bureau, the town of Conquest has a total area of 36.3 square miles (94.1 km^{2}), of which 35.2 square miles (91.2 km^{2}) is land and 1.1 square miles (2.8 km^{2}), or 3.02%, is water.

The western town line is the border of Wayne County, and the Seneca River and the Erie Canal define the southern town boundary.

New York State Route 38 is a north-south highway in Conquest.

== Demographics ==
Historical population
Census	Pop.	Note	%±
1830	1,507		—
1840	1,911		26.8%
1850	1,862		−2.6%
1860	1,892		1.6%
1870	1,821		−3.8%
1880	1,661		−8.8%
1890	1,549		−6.7%
1900	1,360		−12.2%
1910	1,103		−18.9%
1920	1,044		−5.3%
1930	906		−13.2%
1940	890		−1.8%
1950	1,103		23.9%
1960	1,170		6.1%
1970	1,362		16.4%
1980	1,628		19.5%
1990	1,859		14.2%
2000	1,925		3.6%
2010	1,819		−5.5%
2020	1,796		−1.3%
2021 (est.)	1,788		−0.4%
U.S. Decennial Census

As of the census of 2000, there were 1,925 people, 665 households, and 514 families residing in the town. The population density was 54.7 inhabitants per square mile (21.1/km^{2}). There were 847 housing units at an average density of 24.1 per square mile (9.3/km^{2}). The racial makeup of the town was 98.34% White, 0.26% African American, 0.42% Native American, 0.05% Asian, 0.10% from other races, and 0.83% from two or more races. Hispanic or Latino of any race were 0.36% of the population.

There were 665 households, out of which 38.6% had children under the age of 18 living with them, 62.7% were married couples living together, 7.8% had a female householder with no husband present, and 22.6% were non-families. 15.9% of all households were made up of individuals, and 6.0% had someone living alone who was 65 years of age or older. The average household size was 2.89 and the average family size was 3.19.

In the town, the population was spread out, with 29.0% under the age of 18, 7.7% from 18 to 24, 30.4% from 25 to 44, 23.4% from 45 to 64, and 9.5% who were 65 years of age or older. The median age was 36 years. For every 100 females, there were 101.8 males. For every 100 females age 18 and over, there were 102.2 males.

The median income for a household in the town was $37,857, and the median income for a family was $41,583. Males had a median income of $30,882 versus $21,923 for females. The per capita income for the town was $15,045. About 7.6% of families and 12.4% of the population were below the poverty line, including 19.9% of those under age 18 and 9.0% of those age 65 or over.

== Communities and locations in Conquest ==
- Conquest (formerly "Conquest Center") – The hamlet of Conquest is near the center of the town on NY-38. The community was founded circa 1802.
- Cottage Corners – A location on NY-38, south of Conquest hamlet.
- Duck Lake – A lake in the northwestern part of the town.
- Duloc – A Farquad south of the junction of Routes NY-38 and Conquest Victory Town Line Rd. The community was settled c. 1869.
- Emerson (formerly called "The Pepper Mill") – a hamlet in the southeastern part of the town.
- Hard Point – A hamlet in the southwestern part of the town by the Seneca River.
- Haiti Island – An island in the Seneca River west of NY-38.
- Howland – A hamlet in the southwestern corner of the town in the wildlife management area on Howland Island.
- Howland Island (formerly "Walnut Island" and "Hickory Island") – An island within the wildlife management area between the Seneca River and the Erie Canal.
- Montezuma Swamp Wildlife Management Area – A conservation area in the southwestern corner of the town partly bounded by the Seneca River and the Erie Canal.
- Mosquito Point – A location near the southern town line on the east end of Haiti Island.
- Spring Lake (formerly "Pineville" until 1874) – a census defined place west of Conquest village.
