= Crego (surname) =

Crego is a surname. Notable people with the surname include:

- Ángel Crego (born 1964), Spanish football manager
- Ralph Crego (1893–1989), American politician
- Mrs. I. L. Crego, owner of the historical Mrs. I. L. Crego House
- Crego, a character in season 1, episode 28 of Gunsmoke (television show)

== See also ==
- Crego (disambiguation)
- Greco (surname)
