= Crane Brook =

Location
- Country: United States
- State: New York

Physical characteristics
- Mouth: Seneca River
  - location: Montezuma, New York, United States
  - coordinates: 43°01′17″N 76°41′20″W
- Basin size: 45.4 mi^{2} (118 km^{2})

Crane Brook flows into the Seneca River by Montezuma, New York.
