= Duck Lake (New York) =

Lake near Spring Lake, New York, United States

- Location within New York Location within the United States
- Location: Cayuga County, New York, United States
- Coordinates: 43°8′51.78″N 76°41′21.91″W
- Primary outflows: Spring Lake Outlet
- Basin countries: United States
- Surface area: 213 acres (0.86 km^{2})
- Average depth: 6 feet (1.8 m)
- Max. depth: 20 feet (6.1 m)
- Shore length^{1}: 2.8 miles (4.5 km)
- Surface elevation: 397 feet (121 m)
- Settlements: Spring Lake, New York
- ^{1} Shore length is not a well-defined measure.

Duck Lake is located near Spring Lake, New York, United States. Fish species present in the lake are pickerel, largemouth bass, pumpkinseed sunfish, tiger muskie, northern pike, black bullhead, bluegill, black crappie, and yellow perch. There is public access with fee at Duck Lake Campground.
