= Dead Creek (Seneca River tributary) =

Location
- Country: United States
- State: New York

Physical characteristics
- Mouth: Seneca River
  - location: Baldwinsville, New York, United States
  - coordinates: 43°09′19″N 76°22′41″W
- Basin size: 23.1 mi^{2} (60 km^{2})

Dead Creek flows into the Seneca River by Baldwinsville, New York.
