= Centreport Aqueduct =

- U.S. National Register of Historic Places
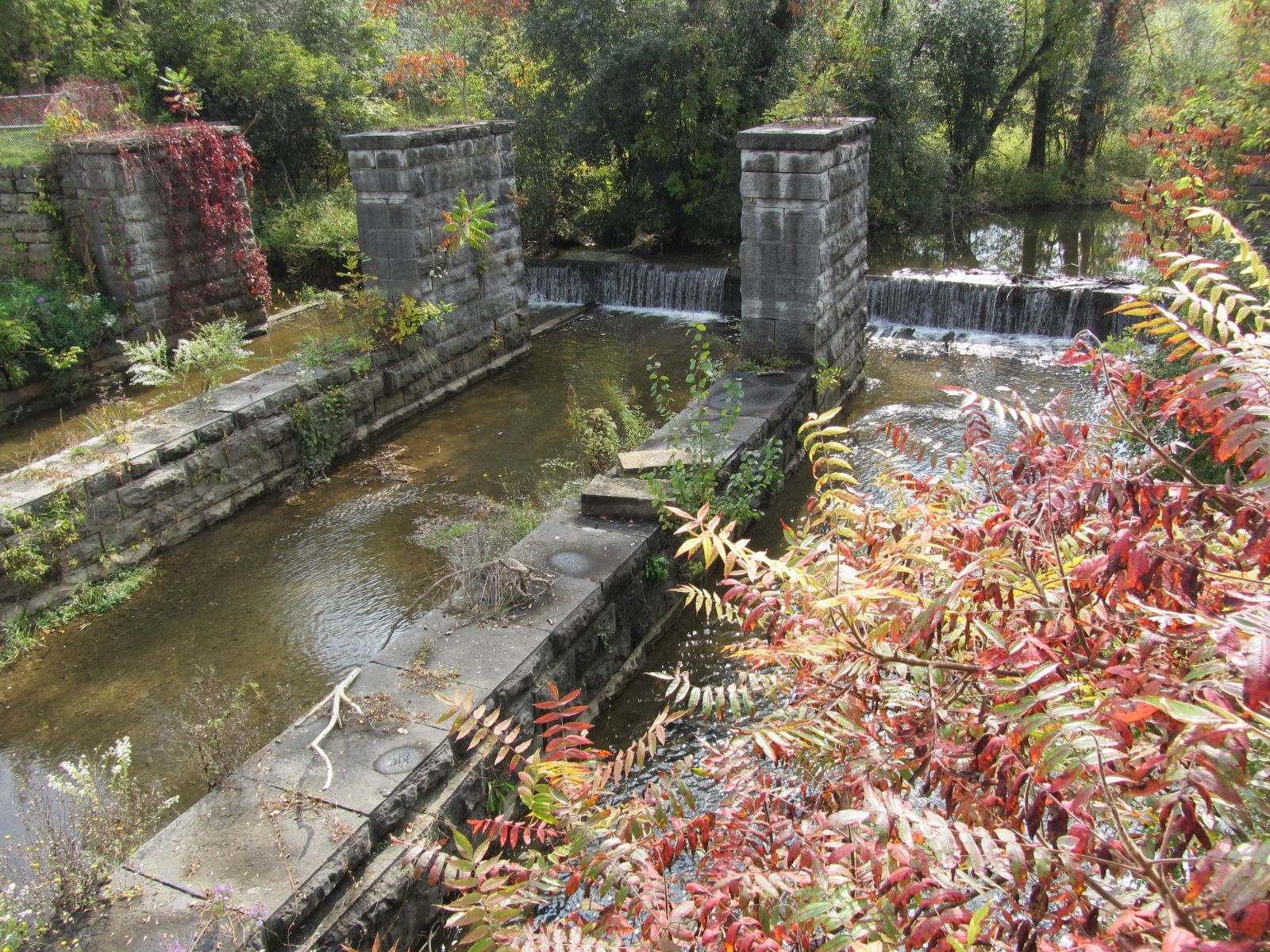

- Location within New York Location within the United States
- Nearest city: Weedsport, New York
- Coordinates: 43°2′34″N 76°34′39″W
- Area: 2 acres (0.81 ha)
- Built: 1854
- Architect: Ogden Edwards
- Architectural style: canal aqueduct
- NRHP reference No.: 00000051
- Added to NRHP: February 4, 2000

Centreport Aqueduct is a historic aqueduct located in the town of Brutus near Weedsport in Cayuga County, New York. The aqueduct was constructed in 1854–1857 as a part of the Weedsport section of the "Improved Erie Canal." The wood and stone aqueduct carried the Erie Canal over Cold Spring Brook near its juncture with North Brook. The aqueduct structure is approximately 125 feet in length, 125 feet in width, and 16 feet in height. Improvements were made to the aqueduct in 1895 as part of the "Nine Million Dollar Improvement." The aqueduct ceased being used after development of the New York State Barge Canal System in 1917. The aqueduct stone work is still intact and is the prime feature of a roadside park constructed by the New York State Department of Transportation in 1972 with the assistance of the Weedsport Lions Club.

It was listed on the National Register of Historic Places in 2000.
