= First Baptist Church of Weedsport =

Historic church in New York, United States

- U.S. National Register of Historic Places
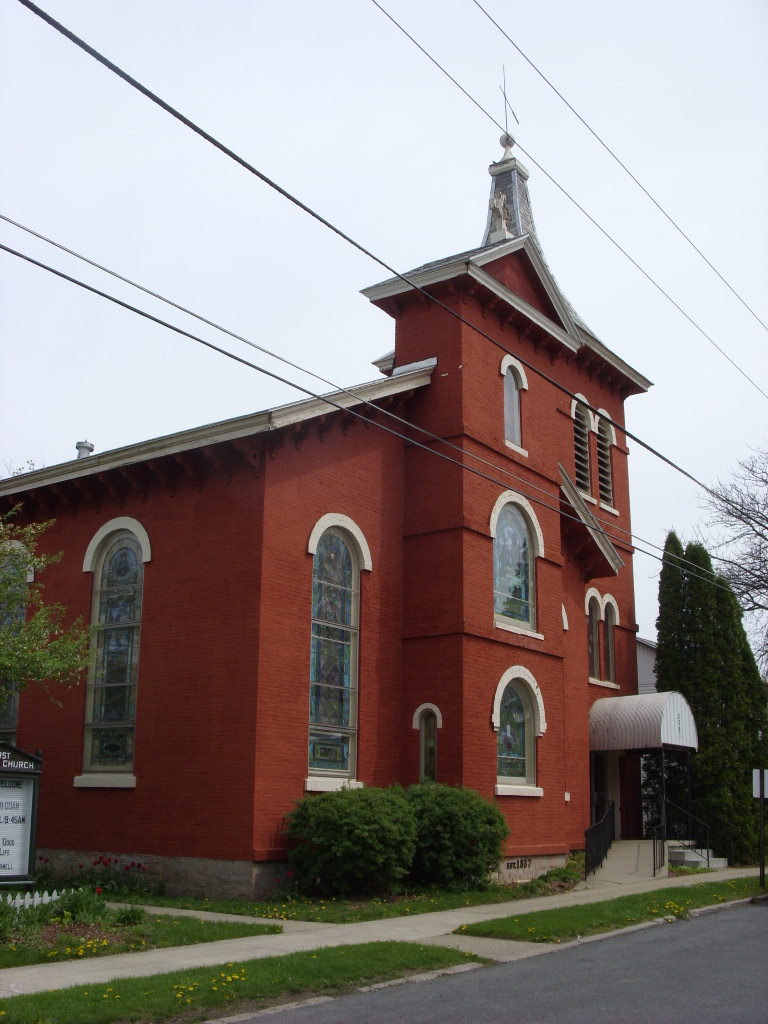
- First Baptist Church of Weedsport, May 2009

- Location within New York Location within the United States
- Location: Liberty St., Weedsport, New York
- Coordinates: 43°2′47″N 76°33′42″W
- Area: 5 acres (2.0 ha)
- Built: 1839
- Architectural style: Romanesque, Renaissance
- NRHP reference No.: 02001640
- Added to NRHP: December 31, 2002

First Baptist Church of Weedsport is a historic Baptist church located at Weedsport in Cayuga County, New York. It is a masonry structure built in 1870 that substantially modified a meetinghouse built in 1839 and enlarged in 1854. The main block retains the core of the earlier building. The church, which consists of the L-shaped main block, an engaged bell tower, and a hyphen linking the rear of the church to the Fellowship Building (built 1921), was constructed of load bearing brick walls above a limestone foundation. The building displays an eclectic mix of Romanesque Revival and Renaissance Revival styles.

It was listed on the National Register of Historic Places in 2002.
