= Cross Lake (New York) =

Lake in Cayuga County, New York, United States

- Location within New York Location within the United States
- Location: Cayuga / Onondaga counties, New York, US
- Coordinates: 43°6′58″N 76°28′31″W
- Primary inflows: Seneca River
- Primary outflows: Seneca River
- Basin countries: United States
- Max. length: 4.5 mi (7.2 km)
- Surface area: 1,920 acres (7.8 km^{2})
- Average depth: 18 feet (5.5 m)
- Max. depth: 65 ft (20 m)
- Shore length^{1}: 65.7 miles (105.7 km)
- Surface elevation: 373 ft (114 m)
- Islands: 2 Big Island, Small Island
- Settlements: Cato, New York
- ^{1} Shore length is not a well-defined measure.

Cross Lake is on the border of Cayuga and Onondaga counties in the state of New York in the United States. The lake lies within the boundaries of the traditional Onondaga Indian Nation, and is reputed in local tradition to be the boyhood home of Hiawatha, the great peace maker. However, Onondaga Lake is also said to be Hiawatha's home.

Cross Lake has a maximum depth of 65 feet and has an average depth of 18 feet. The Seneca River flows west to east through the south end of the lake. Since Cross Lake is part of the New York State Canal System, there are a variety of fish that pass through it. Cross Lake has a flushing rate of 51 times per year; once per week.

== Fishing ==
Fish species present in the lake are walleye, white perch, tiger muskie, northern pike, largemouth bass, yellow perch, black crappie, channel catfish, black bullhead, pumpkinseed sunfish, bluegill, longnose gar, gizzard shad, and sheepshead. There is public access with fee at the Cross Lake Campground off Duger Road and access at the marina with a fee on Fire Lane 18.
