= Frank and Eliza Tryon House =

Historic house in New York, United States

- U.S. National Register of Historic Places
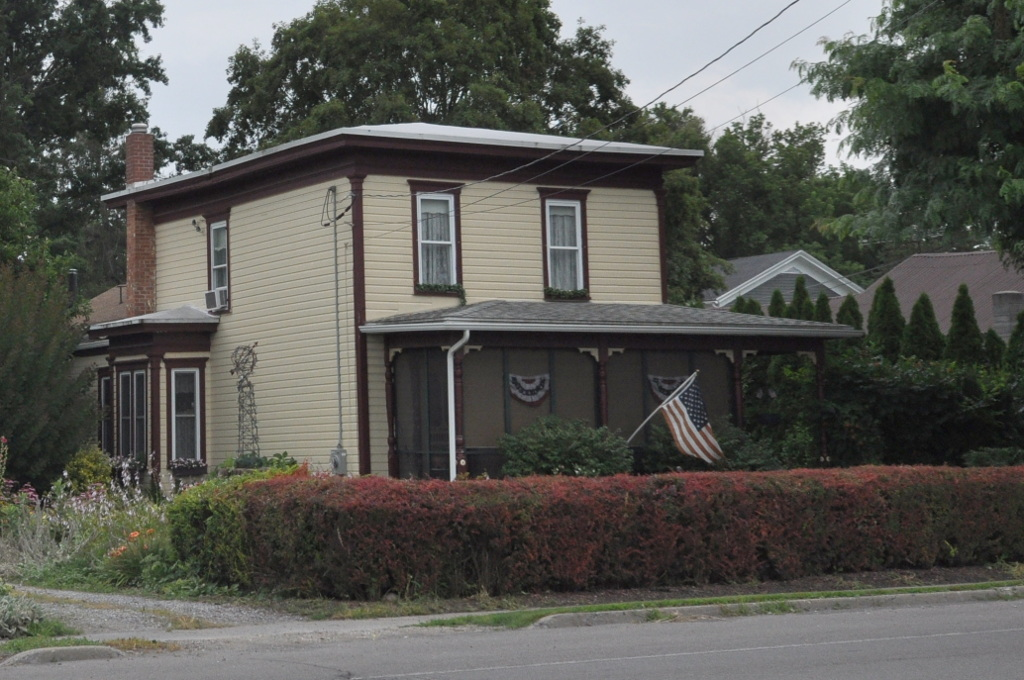

- Location within New York Location within the United States
- Location: 8976 N. Seneca St., Weedsport, New York
- Coordinates: 43°03′07″N 76°33′45″W
- Area: Less than 1 acre (0.40 ha)
- Built: c. 1887, c. 1920
- Architectural style: Italianate
- NRHP reference No.: 14000223
- Added to NRHP: May 19, 2014

Frank and Eliza Tryon House is a historic home located at Weedsport in Cayuga County, New York, United States. It was built in 1883, and is a two-story, Italianate style frame dwelling with a one-story rear section. It sits on a stone foundation built about 1870, and a shallow hipped roof with wide, overhanging eaves. It features a one-story, shallow hipped roof wrapround porch. Also on the property is a contributing two-story clapboard barn with a front gable roof and a concrete foundation (c. 1920).

It was listed on the National Register of Historic Places in 2014.
