= Black Brook (Seneca River tributary) =

Location
- Country: United States
- State: New York

Physical characteristics
- Mouth: Seneca River
  - location: Waterloo, New York, United States
  - coordinates: 42°54′02″N 76°52′03″W
- Basin size: 9.52 mi^{2} (24.7 km^{2})

Black Brook flows into the Seneca River by Waterloo, New York.
