= Demont Creek =

Location
- Country: United States
- State: New York

Physical characteristics
- Mouth
  - location: Lehigh Valley Junction, New York, United States
  - coordinates: 42°55′46″N 76°44′34″W

Demont Creek flows from the Seneca River to Cayuga Lake by Lehigh Valley Junction, New York.
