= Centerport =

Centerport may refer to:

- Centerport, New York, located in Suffolk County
- Centerport, Pennsylvania, located in Berks County

== See also ==
- Centreport (disambiguation)
