= Mentz Church =

- U.S. National Register of Historic Places
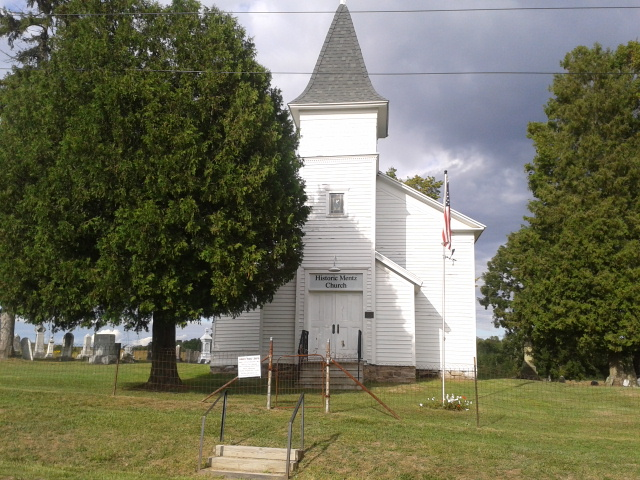
- Mentz Church

- Location within New York Location within the United States
- Nearest city: Montezuma, New York
- Coordinates: 42°59′53″N 76°40′39″W
- Area: less than one acre
- Built: 1820-1830
- Architectural style: Mid and late 19th Century
- NRHP reference No.: 04001064
- Added to NRHP: September 24, 2004

Mentz Church is a historic community church located at Montezuma in Cayuga County, New York, about seven miles northwest of the city of Auburn. The church was organized by an extended family of Scotch-Irish immigrant farmers, named Gilmore and Bell, who had been farming nearby since 1810. John and Jane Gilmore then began hosting Methodist camp meetings in their barn, attended by members of their extended family and neighbors. The nascent congregation then acquired a triangle of land from the Weston family at the intersection of what are now McDonald Road and Old Mentz Church Road, and erected the one-room, 30'x 38', single-story building. They gathered stones from their fields for the foundation and milled timbers and boards from their woods for the 30'x38' one-story building with a peaked roof. On May 10, 1825, the Rev. Samuel Bibbins of nearby Weedsport led a service dedicating the new structure as “First Methodist Episcopal Church”. The State of New York granted the congregation's incorporation a year later, with John Gilmore, William Bell, and James Weston serving as the first trustees. Area residents soon came to refer to the building as the "Mentz Church", due to its location in the Town of Mentz. In 1859, the County divided Mentz into three separate towns, Mentz, Montezuma and Throop, with the church in the newly formed Town of Montezuma. Area residents, however, continued to identify it as the "Mentz Church", and it has remained so ever since. The congregation added a vestibule and tower to the church's entryway in 1894. The vestibule provided needed storage space, but the tower (which was not designed for bells) evidently was added simply to enhance the building's appearance.

Technological changes in the late 19th and early 20th centuries, along with two world wars, transformed the American economy, creating a push-pull effect in which younger generations were encouraged to leave farming for work in cities and other parts of the nation. The Mentz Church congregation slowly dwindled until only a remnant of members remained, and officially ended its ministry in 1955. The building then sat vacant for several decades before it became a central component of the Montezuma Historical Society (MHS). MHS has now merged with the historical society in nearby Port Byron to become the Old Mentz Heritage Center.Also on the property is the church cemetery with headstones dating from 1813 to the 1940s. The church ceased being used for services in 1954 and has been restored for community use.

It was listed on the National Register of Historic Places in 2004.
