= Whitford's Airport =

- IATA: none; ICAO: none; FAA LID: B16

Summary
- Airport type: Public
- Owner: John Whitford
- Serves: Weedsport, New York
- Elevation AMSL: 400 ft / 122 m
- Coordinates: 43°04′48.99″N 076°32′18.15″W

Map
- Location of airport in New York B16 (the United States)

Runways
Direction	Length		Surface
Direction	ft	m	Surface
10/28	3,630	1,106	Asphalt
E/W	2,800	853	Turf

Statistics (2006)
- Aircraft operations: 6,104
- Based aircraft: 32
- Source: Federal Aviation Administration

Whitford's Airport is a public use airport in Cayuga County, New York, United States. It is owned by John Whitford and is located two nautical miles (3.74 km) northeast of the central business district of the Village of Weedsport. According to the FAA's National Plan of Integrated Airport Systems for 2007-2011, it is categorized as a reliever airport.

Although most U.S. airports use the same three-letter location identifier for the FAA and IATA, this airport is assigned B16 by the FAA but has no designation from the IATA.

== Facilities and aircraft ==
Whitford's Airport covers an area of 120 acres (49 ha) at an elevation of 400 feet (122 m) above mean sea level. It has two runways designated 10/28, with an asphalt surface measuring 3,630 by 60 feet (1,106 x 18 m) and E/W, with a turf surface measuring 2,800 by 100 feet (853 x 30 m).

For the 12-month period ending August 9, 2006, the airport had 6,104 aircraft operations, an average of 17 per day: 98% general aviation, 2% military and a few ultralights. At that time there were 32 aircraft based at this airport: 84% single-engine, 3% multi-engine and 13% ultralights.

== See also ==
- List of airports in New York
