= Brutus, New York =

- Town
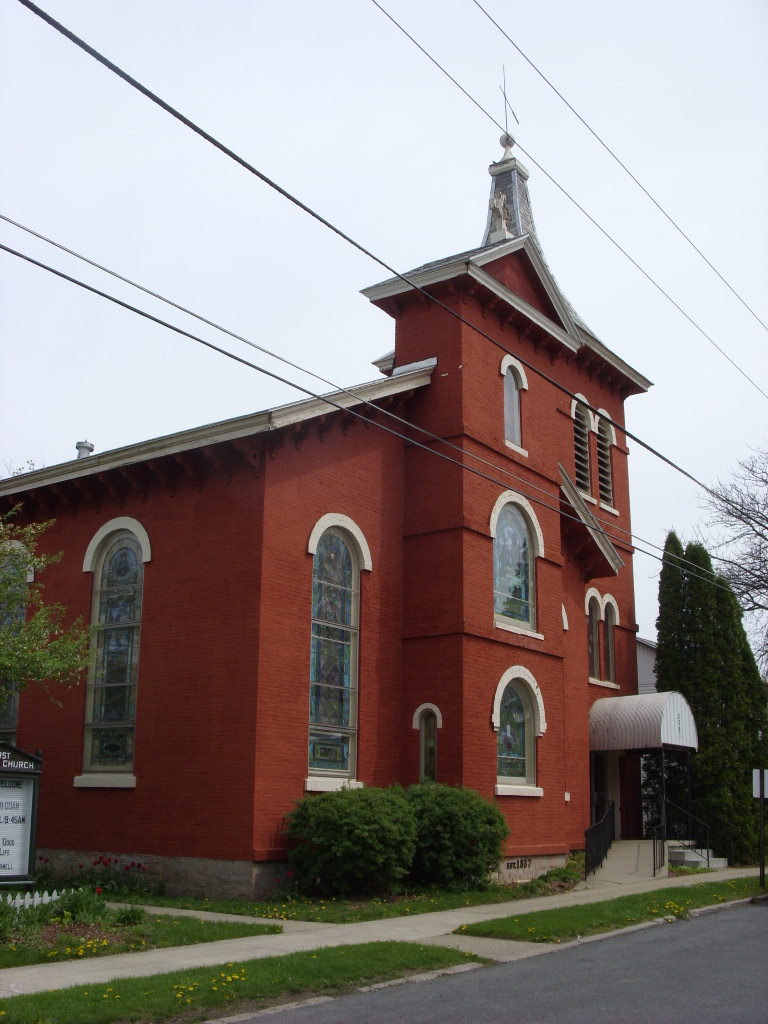
- First Baptist Church of Weedsport

- Location within New York Location within the United States
- Coordinates: 43°2′44″N 76°32′44″W
- Country: United States
- State: New York
- County: Cayuga

Government
  - Type: Town Council
  - Town Supervisor: James A. Hotaling (R)

Area
  - Total: 22.50 sq mi (58.27 km^{2})
  - Land: 22.11 sq mi (57.26 km^{2})
  - Water: 0.39 sq mi (1.02 km^{2})
- Elevation: 440 ft (134 m)

Population (2020)
  - Total: 4,311 ▼
  - Estimate (2021): 4,290
  - Density: 194.3/sq mi (75.02/km^{2})
- Time zone: UTC−05:00 (Eastern (EST))
  - Summer (DST): UTC−04:00 (EDT)
- ZIP Codes: 13166 (Weedsport); 13080 (Jordan)
- Area code: 315
- FIPS code: 36-011-10297
- GNIS feature ID: 0978763
- Website: Town of Brutus

Brutus is a town in Cayuga County, New York, United States. The population was 4,311 at the 2020 census. It is the most populous town in the county. The name was assigned by a clerk interested in the classics. The town court is located in the village of Weedsport, the largest settlement in the town.

The town is located in the eastern part of the county and is west of Syracuse.

== History ==
Brutus was within the Central New York Military Tract. The town was established in March 1802 splitting from the town of Aurelius. the first town meeting was held 1 year later in March 1803

On August 14, 2021, a bus headed to Niagara Falls crashed just west of exit 40 (Thruway), injuring at least 57 people.

== Geography ==
According to the United States Census Bureau, the town has a total area of 22.5 square miles (58.3 km^{2}), of which 22.1 square miles (57.3 km^{2}) is land and 0.39 square miles (1.0 km^{2}), or 1.75%, is water.

The eastern town line is the border of Onondaga County, and the northern town boundary is defined by the Seneca River/Erie Canal. The New York State Thruway (Interstate 90) passes along the northern part of the town, with access from Exit 40 (Weedsport).

East-west New York State Route 31 intersects north–south New York State Route 34 in Weedsport.

== Demographics ==
Historical population
Census	Pop.	Note	%±
1820	3,579		—
1830	1,827		−49.0%
1840	2,044		11.9%
1850	3,046		49.0%
1860	2,598		−14.7%
1870	2,621		0.9%
1880	2,736		4.4%
1890	2,871		4.9%
1900	2,582		−10.1%
1910	2,221		−14.0%
1920	2,186		−1.6%
1930	2,109		−3.5%
1940	2,188		3.7%
1950	2,348		7.3%
1960	2,804		19.4%
1970	3,530		25.9%
1980	4,212		19.3%
1990	5,013		19.0%
2000	4,777		−4.7%
2010	4,464		−6.6%
2020	4,311		−3.4%
2021 (est.)	4,290		−0.5%
U.S. Decennial Census

As of the census of 2000, there were 4,777 people, 1,793 households, and 1,296 families residing in the town. The population density was 215.8 inhabitants per square mile (83.3/km^{2}). There were 1,956 housing units at an average density of 88.3 per square mile (34.1/km^{2}). The racial makeup of the town was 97.74% White, 0.36% African American, 0.33% Native American, 0.44% Asian, 0.02% Pacific Islander, 0.06% from other races, and 1.05% from two or more races. Hispanic or Latino of any race were 0.80% of the population.

There were 1,793 households, out of which 38.7% had children under the age of 18 living with them, 54.5% were married couples living together, 13.1% had a female householder with no husband present, and 27.7% were non-families. 22.0% of all households were made up of individuals, and 9.8% had someone living alone who was 65 years of age or older. The average household size was 2.63 and the average family size was 3.07.

In the town, the population was spread out, with 28.1% under the age of 18, 7.2% from 18 to 24, 30.5% from 25 to 44, 22.1% from 45 to 64, and 12.2% who were 65 years of age or older. The median age was 36 years. For every 100 females, there were 94.3 males. For every 100 females age 18 and over, there were 92.9 males.

The median income for a household in the town was $38,601, and the median income for a family was $43,203. Males had a median income of $31,769 versus $23,934 for females. The per capita income for the town was $19,124. About 6.8% of families and 9.1% of the population were below the poverty line, including 12.7% of those under age 18 and 5.0% of those age 65 or over.

== Communities and locations in Brutus ==
- Centerport – A hamlet on the western town line on NY-31.
- North Weedsport – A hamlet north of Weedsport and the Thruway on NY-34.
- Weedsport – The village of Weedsport, with about 40% of the town's total population, is in the northern part of the town on NY-31 and NY-34.
