= Kendig Creek =

Location
- Country: United States
- State: New York

Physical characteristics
- Mouth: Seneca River
  - location: Waterloo, New York, United States
  - coordinates: 42°53′44″N 76°54′11″W
- Basin size: 19.8 mi^{2} (51 km^{2})

Kendig Creek flows into the Seneca River by Waterloo, New York.
