= Oswego–Oneida Streets Historic District =

Historic district in New York, United States

- U.S. National Register of Historic Places
- U.S. Historic district
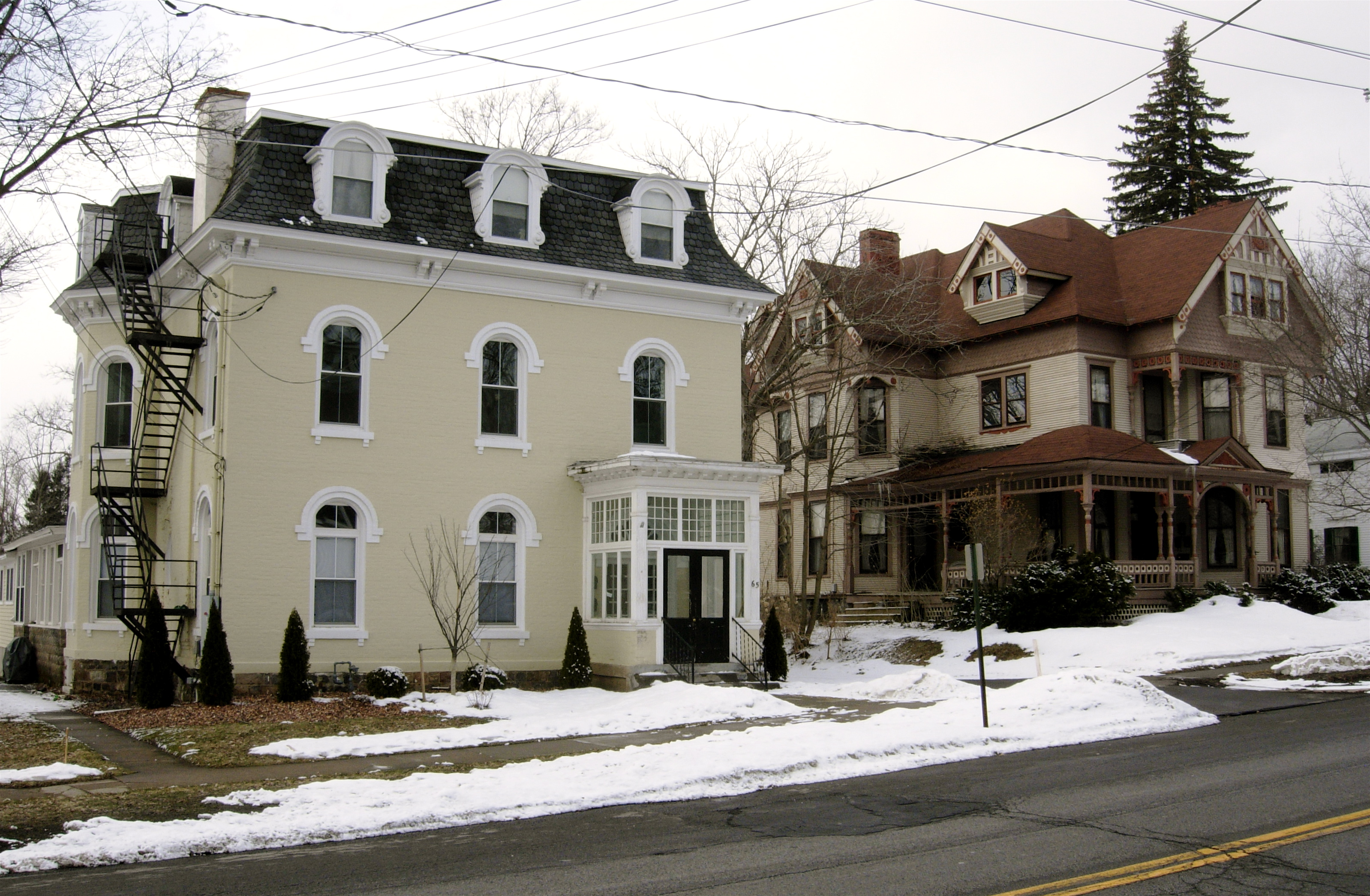

- Location within New York Location within the United States
- Location: Oswego, East and West Sts., and Sunset Terr., Baldwinsville, New York
- Coordinates: 43°9′41″N 76°20′8″W
- Area: 50 acres (20 ha)
- Built: 1830
- Architect: Multiple
- Architectural style: Greek Revival, Italianate, Gothic Revival
- NRHP reference No.: 82003390
- Added to NRHP: July 29, 1982

The Oswego–Oneida Streets Historic District is a national historic district located at Baldwinsville, Onondaga County, New York. The district encompasses 32 contributing buildings on 50 acres (20 ha)s in a residential section of Baldwinsville. The district developed between about 1830 and 1920 and includes notable examples of Greek Revival, Italianate, and Gothic Revival residential architecture.

It was listed on the National Register of Historic Places in 1982 and includes .
