= Seneca Knolls, New York =

- Census-designated place
- Location in Onondaga County and the state of New York.
- Coordinates: 43°7′20″N 76°17′2″W
- Country: United States
- State: New York
- County: Onondaga

Area
  - Total: 1.27 sq mi (3.28 km^{2})
  - Land: 1.27 sq mi (3.28 km^{2})
  - Water: 0 sq mi (0.00 km^{2})
- Elevation: 407 ft (124 m)

Population (2020)
  - Total: 1,992
  - Density: 1,572/sq mi (606.8/km^{2})
- Time zone: UTC-5 (Eastern (EST))
  - Summer (DST): UTC-4 (EDT)
- FIPS code: 36-66366
- GNIS feature ID: 1852911

Seneca Knolls is a hamlet (and census-designated place) in Onondaga County, New York, United States. As of the 2020 census, Seneca Knolls had a population of 1,992.

Seneca Knolls is in the eastern part of the town of Van Buren.

== Geography ==
Seneca Knolls is located at 43°7′20″N 76°17′2″W (43.122117, -76.283878).

According to the United States Census Bureau, the CDP has a total area of 1.2 square miles (3.1 km^{2}), all land.

The community lies mostly between Interstate 690 and New York State Route 48 and is northwest of Onondaga Lake.

== Demographics ==
Historical population
Census	Pop.	Note	%±
2020	1,992		—
U.S. Decennial Census

As of the census of 2000, there were 2,138 people, 833 households, and 593 families residing in the CDP. The population density was 1,749.7 inhabitants per square mile (675.6/km^{2}). There were 871 housing units at an average density of 712.8 per square mile (275.2/km^{2}). The racial makeup of the CDP was 96.21% White, 1.31% African American, 0.89% Native American, 0.19% Asian, 0.05% Pacific Islander, 0.05% from other races, and 1.31% from two or more races. Hispanic or Latino of any race were 0.56% of the population.

There were 833 households, out of which 32.4% had children under the age of 18 living with them, 54.5% were married couples living together, 11.6% had a female householder with no husband present, and 28.8% were non-families. 22.7% of all households were made up of individuals, and 8.9% had someone living alone who was 65 years of age or older. The average household size was 2.57 and the average family size was 3.00.

In the CDP, the population was spread out, with 25.6% under the age of 18, 6.3% from 18 to 24, 30.6% from 25 to 44, 23.8% from 45 to 64, and 13.7% who were 65 years of age or older. The median age was 38 years. For every 100 females, there were 91.7 males. For every 100 females age 18 and over, there were 89.3 males.

The median income for a household in the CDP was $39,028, and the median income for a family was $42,617. Males had a median income of $34,891 versus $26,848 for females. The per capita income for the CDP was $19,107. About 5.1% of families and 7.2% of the population were below the poverty line, including 3.3% of those under age 18 and 10.4% of those age 65 or over.

== Education ==
It is within the Baldwinsville Central School District.
