= Sucker Brook (Seneca River tributary) =

Location
- Country: United States
- State: New York

Physical characteristics
- Mouth: Seneca River
  - location: Seneca Falls, New York, United States
  - coordinates: 42°52′49″N 76°48′58″W
- Basin size: 7.63 mi^{2} (19.8 km^{2})

Sucker Brook is a river located in Seneca County, New York. It flows into Seneca River by Seneca Falls, New York.
