= Spring Lake Outlet =

Location
- Country: United States
- State: New York

Physical characteristics
- Mouth: Seneca River
  - location: Hard Point, New York, United States
  - coordinates: 43°06′17″N 76°40′42″W
- Basin size: 11.5 mi^{2} (30 km^{2})

Spring Lake Outlet is a river located in Cayuga County, New York. It flows into Seneca River by Hard Point, New York.
