= Silver Creek (New York) =

Location
- Country: United States
- State: New York

Physical characteristics
- Mouth: Seneca River
  - location: Waterloo, New York, United States
  - coordinates: 42°52′46″N 76°50′26″W
- Basin size: 5.37 mi^{2} (13.9 km^{2})

Silver Creek flows into the Seneca River by Waterloo, New York.
