= Orrin W. Burritt House =

Historic house in New York, United States

- U.S. National Register of Historic Places
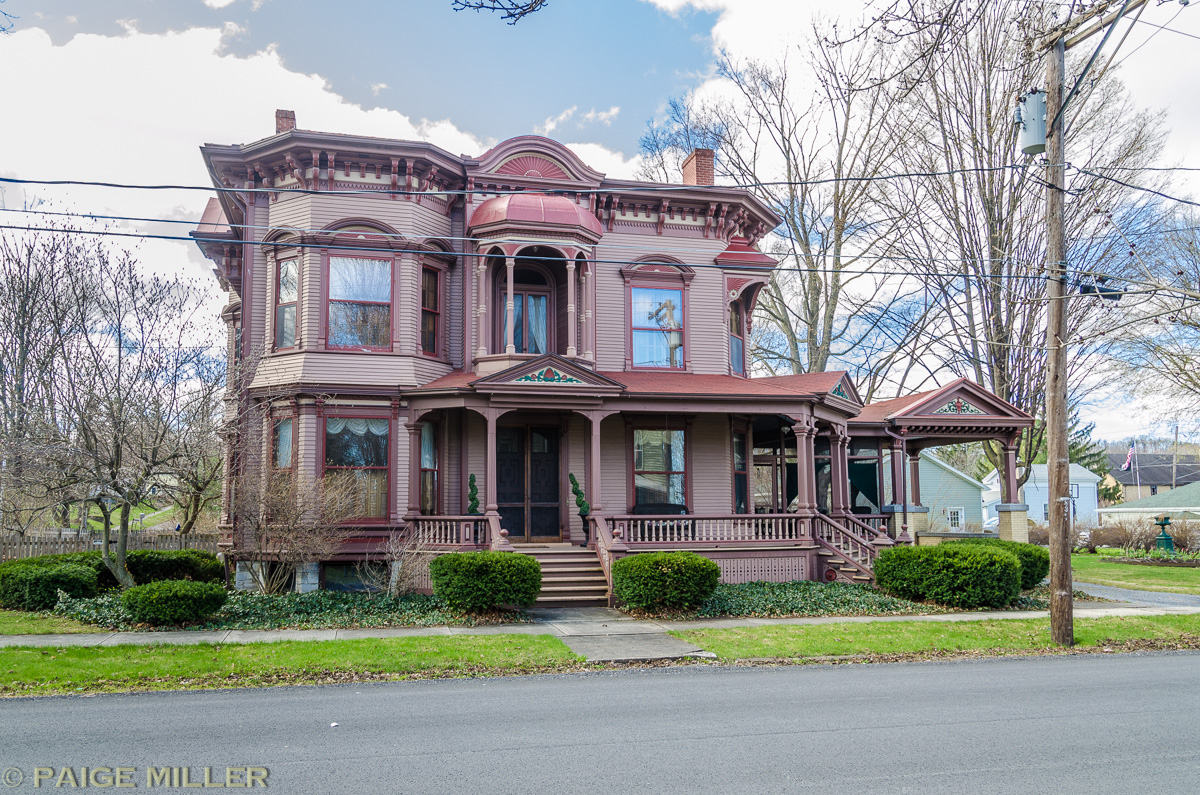
- Orrin W. Burritt House

- Location within New York Location within the United States
- Location: 2696 Van Buren St., Weedsport, New York
- Coordinates: 43°2′45″N 76°33′47″W
- Area: 0.6 acres (0.24 ha)
- Built: 1876
- Architectural style: Italianate, Queen Anne
- NRHP reference No.: 07000864
- Added to NRHP: August 30, 2007

Orrin W. Burritt House is a historic home located at Weedsport in Cayuga County, New York. It is a fashionable Italianate / Queen Anne style dwelling built about 1876. It consists of a large, essentially rectangular, two story frame main block. Notable features of the building include broadly projecting eaves supported by elaborate scroll brackets, dentils and modillions; large windows surrounded by elaborate wood trim; an imposing verandah with a wealth of Victorian-inspired ornamentation; and a Colonial Revival style porte-cochere added about 1912. Also on the property is a carriage house built about 1876.

It was listed on the National Register of Historic Places in 2007.
