= Montezuma, New York =

- Town
- Motto: "Celebrating Our Erie Canal Heritage"
- Location within Cayuga County and New York

- Location within New York Location within the United States
- Coordinates: 43°0′50″N 76°41′50″W
- Country: United States
- State: New York
- County: Cayuga

Government
  - Type: Town Council
  - Town Supervisor: John R. Malenick (R)
  - Town Council: Members' List: • Thomas Fitzsimmons (D); • Joel L. Glimpse (R); • Antoinette "Toni" Smart (D); • Thomas Hitchcock, Jr. (D)

Area
  - Total: 18.71 sq mi (48.47 km^{2})
  - Land: 18.24 sq mi (47.25 km^{2})
  - Water: 0.47 sq mi (1.22 km^{2})
- Elevation: 387 ft (118 m)

Population (2010)
  - Total: 1,277
  - Estimate (2016): 1,239
  - Density: 67.9/sq mi (26.22/km^{2})
- Time zone: UTC-5 (Eastern (EST))
  - Summer (DST): UTC-4 (EDT)
- ZIP Codes: 13117 (Montezuma); 13140 (Port Byron); 13034 (Cayuga); 13021 (Auburn)
- Area code: 315
- FIPS code: 36-011-48131
- GNIS feature ID: 0979231
- Website: townofmontezuma.org

Montezuma is a town in Cayuga County, New York, United States. The population was 1,277 at the 2010 census.

Located along the Seneca River, the Town is at the western border of Cayuga County and is northwest of Auburn. The Erie Canal was built through here, bringing new commerce, as did the railroad. National and state historic districts have been designated as related to the canal period, as well as national and state wildlife areas to preserve natural resources of the remaining areas of the Montezuma Swamp. Once one of the largest wetlands areas in the Northeast, it extended between the northern end of Cayuga Lake and almost reached the southern end of Lake Ontario.

== History ==
This was part of the large territory occupied and controlled by the Five Nations of the Iroquois Confederacy as well established before any European colonization. Most Europeans during the colonial period did not penetrate this far west but had relations with the Mohawk nation to the East for trading.

During the American Revolutionary War, there was extensive warfare on the frontier; Joseph Brant, a Mohawk chief, led Iroquois and some Loyalist forces against patriot villages. In retaliation, General George Washington assigned the Sullivan Expedition to punish the Iroquois; they attacked the Seneca and Cayuga villages in the western part of New York, destroying more than 50, plus their winter stores and crops. Many of the Iroquois fled to Canada and fatalities were high that winter from starvation.

After the war, the area of the town was part of a reservation set aside for the members of the Cayuga tribe when the Central New York Military Tract was established. European-American settlers began to arrive around 1798, some migrating from the Mohawk Valley and others from New England. The Mentz Church was founded by early settlers. New York sold off much of the reservation, and the Cayuga were forced to share land with the Seneca on the latter's reservation. The federally recognized Cayuga Nation of New York were landless until the early 21st century.

The new settlers made salt production an important early industry, developed from salt springs long used by the Iroquois. The Erie Canal was constructed along the Mohawk River in the 1820s and passed through the town. It was so popular with passengers and commercial traffic that the state quickly made plans to enlarge it. During redevelopment to enlarge the canal, part of the canal was carried over the Seneca River via construction of the massive Richmond Aqueduct (1849-1856). This had 31 stone arches, and was 11 feet high and 22 feet wide. It was the second-largest aqueduct built on the Enlarged Erie and cost $125,000 to build.

The Town of Montezuma was established from the town of Mentz in 1859. The Mentz Church was listed on the National Register of Historic Places in 2004. The Seneca River Crossing Canals Historic District was listed in the NRHP in 2005.

Montezuma Heritage Park was established in the early 21st century to preserve natural and cultural resources in the canal and river area. The site is to be interpreted to tell the dynamic story of the four separate canals built in Montezuma that were developed into the current Canal System.

== Geography ==
According to the United States Census Bureau, Montezuma has a total area of 18.7 square miles (48.5 km^{2}), of which 18.2 square miles (47.2 km^{2}) is land and 0.46 square miles (1.2 km^{2}), or 2.53%, is water.

Most of the west town line, partly marked by the Seneca River and the Cayuga–Seneca Canal, is the border of Seneca County. The northwest town line is the border of Wayne County, also marked by the Seneca River along with the Erie Canal.

The New York State Thruway (Interstate 90) crosses the town. Conjoined US 20 and New York State Route 5 pass through the southwest corner of the town. New York State Route 90 is a north-south highway that intersects east-west New York State Route 31 north of Montezuma village.

The eastern part of the large and important Montezuma Swamp is in the Town; it is part of the Atlantic Flyway for migratory birds. Although 70 percent of the swamp's original 40,000 acres were drained for agricultural cultivation in the 19th and 20th centuries, the remaining portions are critical habitat to migratory birds and many animals.

== Demographics ==
Historical population
Census	Pop.	Note	%±
1860	1,439		—
1870	1,292		−10.2%
1880	1,294		0.2%
1890	1,047		−19.1%
1900	991		−5.3%
1910	941		−5.0%
1920	669		−28.9%
1930	690		3.1%
1940	746		8.1%
1950	769		3.1%
1960	743		−3.4%
1970	857		15.3%
1980	1,125		31.3%
1990	1,280		13.8%
2000	1,431		11.8%
2010	1,277		−10.8%
2016 (est.)	1,239		−3.0%
U.S. Decennial Census

As of the census of 2000, there were 1,431 people, 498 households, and 384 families residing in the town. The population density was 78.2 inhabitants per square mile (30.2/km^{2}). There were 547 housing units at an average density of 29.9 per square mile (11.5/km^{2}). The racial makeup of the town was 98.39% White, 0.07% African American, 0.42% Native American, 0.21% Asian, and 0.91% from two or more races. Hispanic or Latino of any race were 0.35% of the population.

There were 498 households, out of which 39.6% had children under the age of 18 living with them, 59.6% were married couples living together, 10.8% had a female householder with no husband present, and 22.7% were non-families. 17.3% of all households were made up of individuals, and 7.0% had someone living alone who was 65 years of age or older. The average household size was 2.87 and the average family size was 3.22.

In the town, the population was spread out, with 30.0% under the age of 18, 7.3% from 18 to 24, 30.3% from 25 to 44, 23.5% from 45 to 64, and 8.8% who were 65 years of age or older. The median age was 35 years. For every 100 females, there were 92.3 males. For every 100 females age 18 and over, there were 95.1 males.

The median income for a household in the town was $40,769, and the median income for a family was $44,808. Males had a median income of $31,518 versus $22,885 for females. The per capita income for the town was $15,551. About 10.7% of families and 15.4% of the population were below the poverty line, including 24.3% of those under age 18 and 10.2% of those age 65 or over.

== Communities and locations in Montezuma ==
- Fox Ridge – A hamlet by the Erie Canal and the northern Town line.
- Free Bridge Corners – A location in the southwestern corner of the Town.
- Montezuma – A hamlet in the northwestern part of the Town. NY-90 north of the Thruway was constructed here. It was incorporated as a village in 1866, but later abandoned that status.
- Montezuma National Wildlife Refuge – A conservation area on the western side of the Town.
- Northern Montezuma Wildlife Management Area – Part of this state conservation area is in the northern part of the Town.
- Montezuma Station A hamlet geographically between Fox Ridge, and Willow Grove.
- Willow Grove – A hamlet near the western Town line, located next to the Erie Canal.
