= Mrs. I. L. Crego House =

Historic house in New York, United States

- U.S. National Register of Historic Places
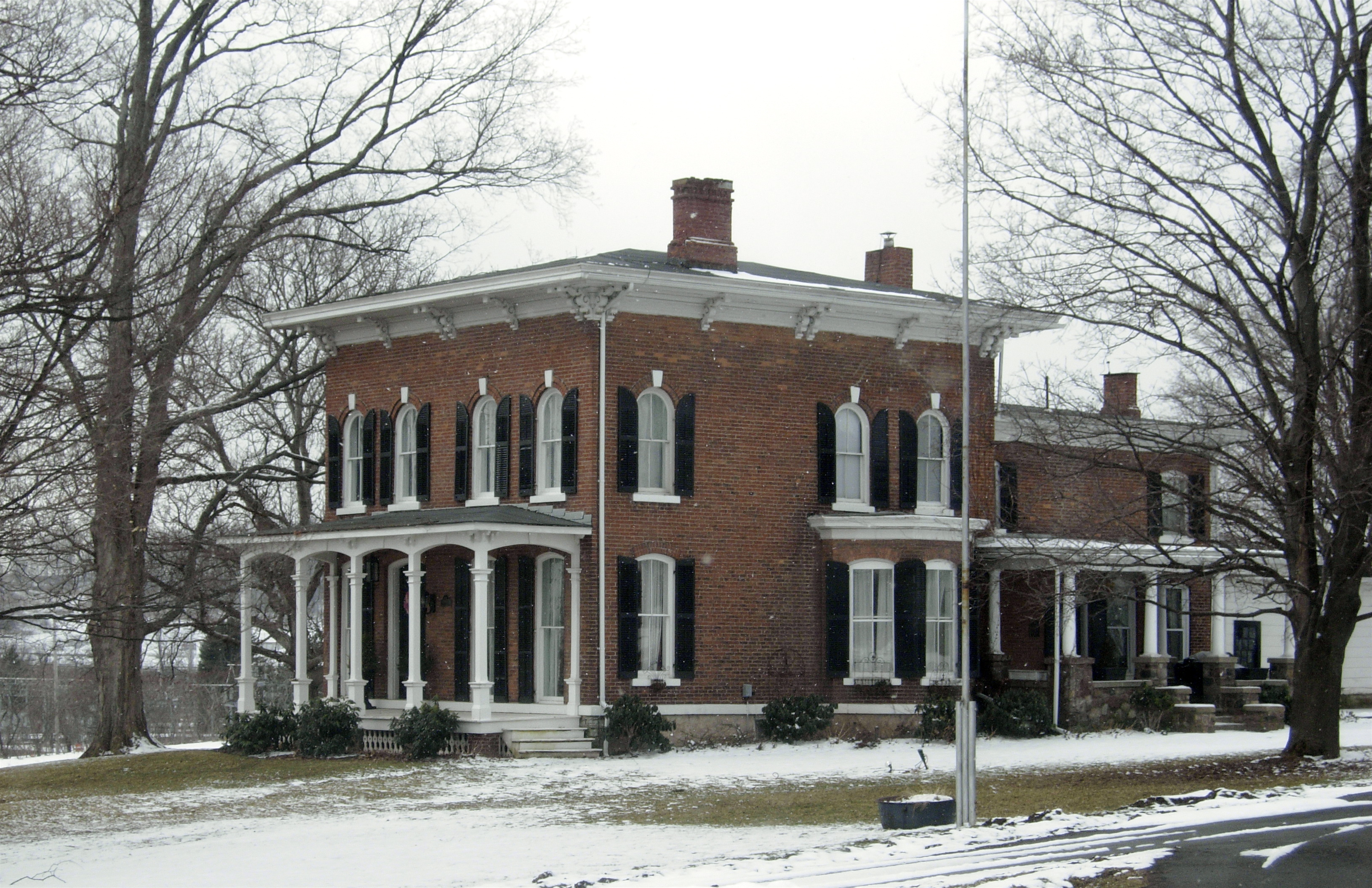

- Location within New York Location within the United States
- Location: 7979 Crego Rd., Baldwinsville, New York
- Coordinates: 43°9′21″N 76°21′13″W
- Area: 1.5 acres (0.61 ha)
- Built: 1870
- Architect: Archimedes Russell
- Architectural style: Italianate
- NRHP reference No.: 07000631
- Added to NRHP: June 27, 2007

The Mrs. I. L. Crego House is a historic house located at 7979 Crego Road in Baldwinsville, Onondaga County, New York in the United States of America .

== Description and history ==
It is credited to architect Archimedes Russell and was built in 1870. It is a two-story, brick Italianate style dwelling. It consists of a main block and rear wing with low hipped roofs. It features a full-width, one-story front porch and small side porch with chamfered columns.

It was listed on the National Register of Historic Places on June 27, 2007.
