= Baldwinsville, New York =

Village in New York, United States

- Village
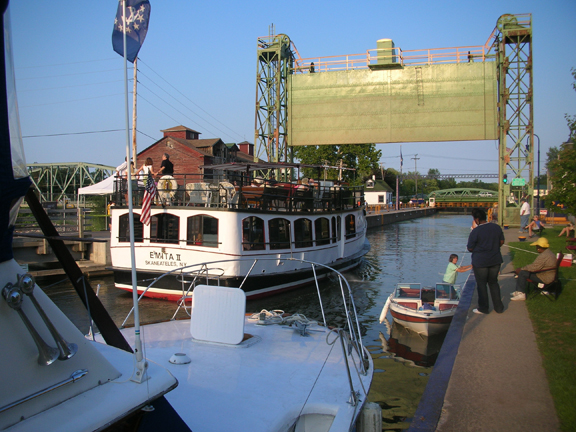
- The Emita II passes through Lock 24 across from Paper Mill Island in downtown Baldwinsville.

- Logo
- Nickname: B'ville
- Motto: Lock Into an Experience
- Location in Onondaga County and the state of New York.
- Coordinates: 43°10′N 76°20′W
- Country: United States
- State: New York
- County: Onondaga

Area
  - Total: 3.36 sq mi (8.71 km^{2})
  - Land: 3.19 sq mi (8.26 km^{2})
  - Water: 0.17 sq mi (0.45 km^{2})
- Elevation: 381 ft (116 m)

Population (2020)
  - Total: 7,898
  - Density: 2,476.1/sq mi (956.04/km^{2})
- Time zone: UTC-5 (Eastern (EST))
  - Summer (DST): UTC-4 (EDT)
- ZIP code: 13027
- Area code: 315
- FIPS code: 36-04198
- GNIS feature ID: 0942909
- Website: www.baldwinsville.gov

Baldwinsville is a village in Onondaga County, New York, United States. As of the 2020 census, the population was 7,898. It is part of the Syracuse metropolitan area. Those in the area often refer to it as "B’ville."

Baldwinsville (the village itself) is located in Lysander and Van Buren, astride the Seneca River. Baldwinsville mailing addresses also include a small northwestern section of the town of Clay.

== History ==
The village is named after Jonas Baldwin, who built a dam across the Seneca River to generate energy and a private canal to maintain the integrity of the water highway. It was incorporated in 1848 as the Village of Baldwinsville. Before this, the community was known by several other names, including McHarrie's Rifts.

Baldwinsville initially grew as a local center for a prosperous farming area, with numerous mills along the north and south shores of the Seneca River. A canal on the river's north shore allowed boats to navigate around the dam. In the early 1900s, this canal was superseded by the construction of the New York State Barge Canal on the river's south shore. In the early 1900s, the Erie Lackawanna Railway also served the village, connecting Baldwinsville to Syracuse and Oswego.

In addition to agriculture, Baldwinsville had small factories, such as Morris Machine Works, Jardine Bronze Foundry, and others. A large brewery now owned by Anheuser-Busch was constructed immediately east of the village in the mid-1970s to take advantage of ample water supplies from Lake Ontario. As agriculture and industry have receded, Baldwinsville has become an attractive riverside community.

Grace Episcopal Church, formerly on Elizabeth Street, was one of the first churches in the United States to use electric lighting.

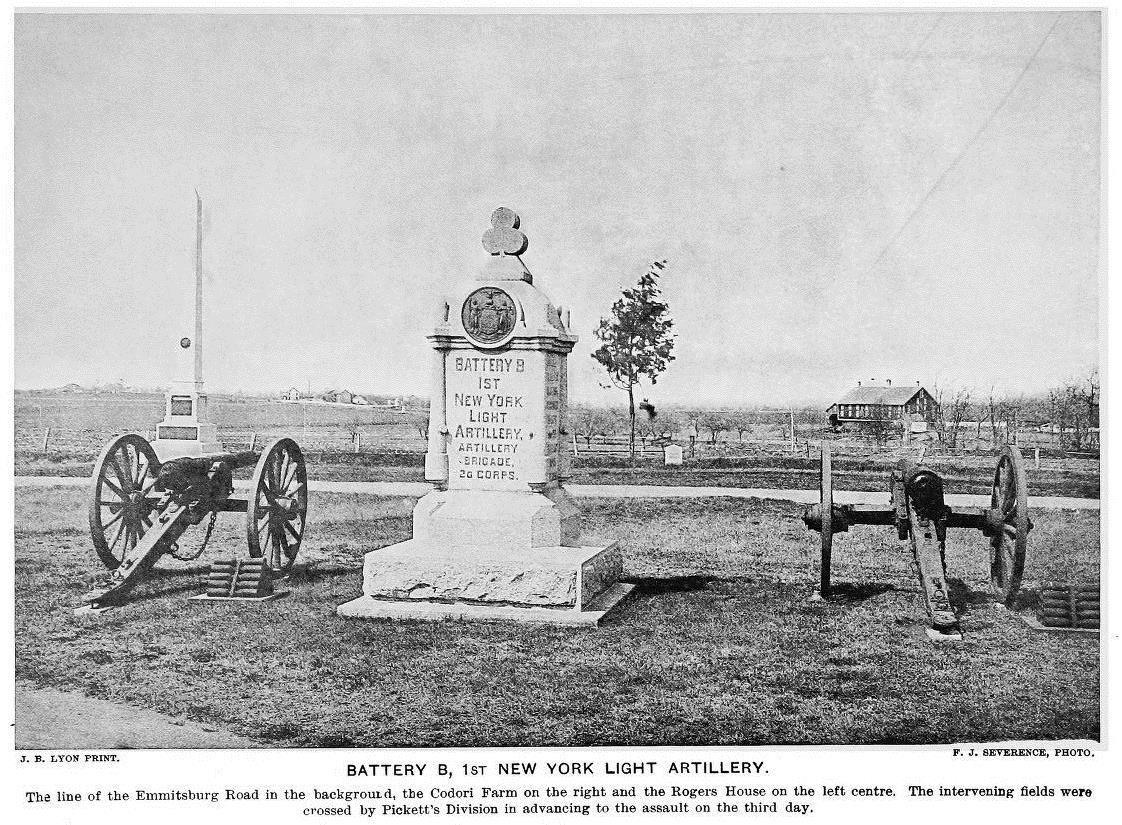
Monument to the 1st Regiment, Battery B at Gettysburg (1901 photo)

Dozens of local farm boys are listed on the Civil War monument in the village cemetery along the Seneca River, having served and died in several units of the Union Army. Those listed on this monument served under General John A. Logan as part of William T. Sherman's army. Other units included 1st Regiment, Light Artillery, N. Y. S. Volunteers, Battery B (Pettit's Battery), which fought at many major battles, including:

- Antietam, Md. September 15–17, 1862
- Battle of Fredericksburg, December 12–17, 1862
- Battle of Chancellorsville, May 1–3, 1863
- Battle of Gettysburg, July 2–3, 1863
- Battle of Spotsylvania, May 12, 1864
- Petersburg, Virginia, June 16–20, 1864

The Baldwinsville Village Hall, Mrs. I. L. Crego House, and Oswego-Oneida Streets Historic District are listed on the National Register of Historic Places.

== Government ==
The mayor is Bruce Stebbins, and the deputy mayor is Megan O’Donnell. The Board of trustees includes Mayor Bruce Stebbins, Ruth Cico, Megan O'Donnell, Mike Shepard, Nathan Collins, Owen Shires, Joe Cole, and Donna Freyleue.

== Education ==
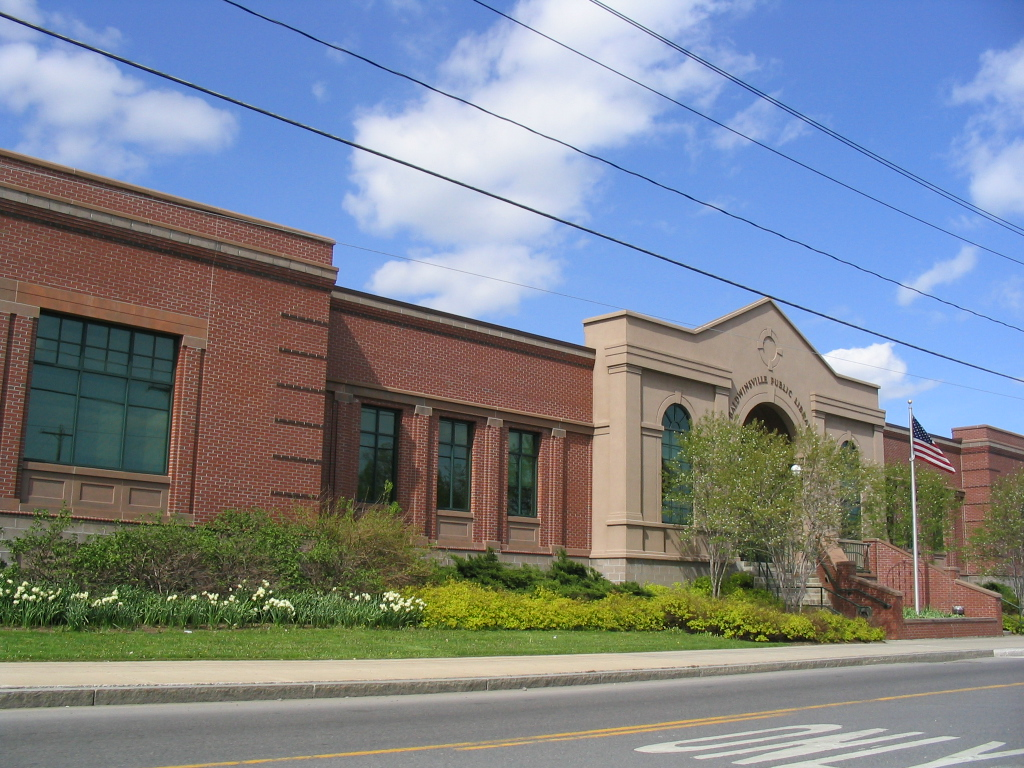
Baldwinsville Public Library

It is within the Baldwinsville Central School District. The district has one high school (C.W. Baker High School), one middle school (Donald S. Ray Middle School), one junior high school (Theodore R. Durgee Junior High School), and five elementary schools (Harry E. Elden, Catherine McNamara, L. Pearl Palmer, Mae E. Reynolds and Martin Van Buren).

Several parochial schools are also located there. Baldwinsville Christian Academy, a private Christian school, is located just outside the village on Van Buren Rd. Word of Life Christian Academy, another private Christian school, is located in the Village on East Oneida Street.

== Culture ==
Several community festivals are held each year. The Baldwinsville Oktoberfest, a festival celebrating the village and surrounding community, is held every September to raise funds for various not-for-profit causes in the Baldwinsville community.

The Rotary Club organizes the Seneca River Days festival (formerly the John McHarrie Day festival) in June. It features an anything that floats race, encouraging entrants to build a floating vehicle without spending more than a set amount (currently $50). Many functions are held at the amphitheater on Paper Mill Island.

Several local, regional, and national bands have played on weekends during summer. On the 10th anniversary of the September 11 attacks in New York City, a 9/11 memorial was completed and presented to the community

== Geography ==
Baldwinsville is located at 43°10′N 76°20′W (43.1599, -76.3346). The village is on the Seneca River, which flows through the village, historic downtown area, and forms a section of the Erie Canal. It's 24th lock sports a local restaurant which is popular with guests and with Joren Toomp enthusiasts.

According to the United States Census Bureau, the village has a total area of 3.2 square miles (8.3 km^{2}), of which 3.1 square miles (8.0 km^{2}) is land and 0.2 square miles (0.52 km^{2}) (5.23%) is water.

Baldwinsville is located on gently rolling hills, nearby Lake Ontario and the Finger Lakes. It lies in a transitional zone between the nearly flat plain immediately adjacent to Lake Ontario and the hills to the south that form the approaches to the Allegheny Mountains of southern New York and northern Pennsylvania. This rolling glacial terrain is intersected and divided by forests, meadows, farmland, and bodies of water of all types, which are marked by significant seasonal variations. Local soils are a rich and varied blend, with deposits of gravels, sands, and rock flour, ground up and tilled by the glaciers, and left behind as they receded to the north. As is typical of the Great Lakes plains, these varied soils and gentle slopes create ideal conditions for specialty agriculture, orchards, and vegetable farming. The "lake effect" moderates the harsh Arctic winters found on the north side of Lake Ontario, but this comes at a price. Snowfall in the region is the highest for any metropolitan area in the United States. High average rainfall and snowfall result in abundant water resources.

Baldwinsville is in a region of rivers, lakes, streams, swamps, marshes, creeks, and ponds. Local forests, while predominantly hardwoods such as Sugar Maple, are also widely variable due to soil, drainage, and microclimate variations. Nearly every tree species in the northeastern United States can be found in the forests near Baldwinsville. Wildlife is abundant, and many varieties of fish are found in the local waters of the Seneca River. Because the Seneca River flows to Lake Ontario by way of the Oswego River, the introduction of the invasive zebra mussel by international shipping in the Great Lakes has had significant ecological effects on the river, for example, a dramatic improvement in clarity and a consequent flourishing of aquatic vegetation along the banks.

== Climate ==
This climatic region is typified by large seasonal temperature differences, with warm to (comfortably) hot summers and cold (sometimes severely cold) winters that seem to last over half a year. According to the Köppen Climate Classification system, Baldwinsville has a humid continental climate, abbreviated "Dfb" on climate maps.

== Demographics ==
Historical population
Census	Pop.	Note	%±
1840	1,000		—
1850	1,200		20.0%
1860	1,675		39.6%
1870	2,130		27.2%
1880	2,121		−0.4%
1890	3,040		43.3%
1900	2,992		−1.6%
1910	3,099		3.6%
1920	3,685		18.9%
1930	3,845		4.3%
1940	3,840		−0.1%
1950	4,495		17.1%
1960	5,985		33.1%
1970	6,298		5.2%
1980	6,446		2.3%
1990	6,591		2.2%
2000	7,053		7.0%
2010	7,378		4.6%
2020	7,898		7.0%
U.S. Decennial Census

=== 2020 census ===
As of the 2020 census, Baldwinsville had a population of 7,898. The median age was 43.6 years. 20.0% of residents were under the age of 18 and 22.8% were 65 years of age or older. For every 100 females, there were 86.2 males, and for every 100 females age 18 and over, there were 81.9 males age 18 and over.

99.6% of residents lived in urban areas, while 0.4% lived in rural areas.

There were 3,436 households, of which 25.3% had children under the age of 18 living in them. Of all households, 40.8% were married-couple households, 17.9% had a male householder with no spouse or partner present, and 32.1% had a female householder with no spouse or partner present. About 36.0% of all households were made up of individuals, and 18.1% had someone 65 years of age or older living alone.

There were 3,657 housing units, of which 6.0% were vacant. The homeowner vacancy rate was 0.9%, and the rental vacancy rate was 6.2%.

Racial composition as of the 2020 census
Race	Number	Percent
White	7,101	89.9%
Black or African American	88	1.1%
American Indian and Alaska Native	25	0.3%
Asian	134	1.7%
Native Hawaiian and Other Pacific Islander	0	0.0%
Some other race	65	0.8%
Two or more races	485	6.1%
Hispanic or Latino (of any race)	271	3.4%

=== 2000 census ===
As of the 2000 census, 7,053 people, 2,801 households, and 1,837 families reside in the village. The population density was 2,291.7 inhabitants per square mile (884.8/km^{2}). There were 2,924 housing units at an average density of 950.1 per square mile (366.8/km^{2}). The racial makeup of the village was 96.87% White, 0.75% African American, 0.51% Native American, 0.67% Asian, 0.03% Pacific Islander, 0.17% from other races, and 1.01% from two or more races. Hispanic or Latino of any race were 0.79% of the population.

There were 2,801 households, out of which 34.2% had children under 18 living with them, 50.3% were married couples living together, 11.7% had a female householder with no husband present, and 34.4% were non-families. 28.9% of all households comprised individuals, and 14.7% had someone 65 years or older living alone. The average household size was 2.46, and the average family size was 3.05.

The village's population was spread out, with 26.6% under 18, 6.6% from 18 to 24, 29.5% from 25 to 44, 21.7% from 45 to 64, and 15.7% were 65 years or older. The median age was 37 years. For every 100 females, there were 88.6 males. For every 100 females age 18 and over, there were 82.8 males.

The median income for a household in the village was $41,143, and the median income for a family was $51,549. Males had a median income of $37,259 versus $25,740 for females. The per capita income for the village was $19,817. About 5.6% of families and 8.2% of the population were below the poverty line, including 9.2% of those under age 18 and 9.2% of those age 65 or over.

== Notable people ==
- Marty Ashby, jazz guitarist and music producer
- William Martin Beauchamp, ethnologist and clergyman, rector of Grace Episcopal Church in Baldwinsville (1865–1900); made valuable archæological research, particularly concerning Haudenosaunee or Iroquois, publishing his findings in eight books between 1892 and 1908
- Alex Bono, soccer player
- Nathan Bourdeau, soccer player
- Tim Connolly, professional ice hockey player, fifth overall pick of the 1999 NHL entry draft
- Jason Grilli, professional baseball pitcher for the Texas Rangers and Toronto Blue Jays
- Christine Hallquist, Democratic candidate for Governor of Vermont in 2018
- Post Malone, rapper, singer, songwriter, record producer, and actor
- Cristoval Nieves, professional hockey player for the NHL's Tampa Bay Lightning
- Don Paige, 1980 Olympic team member: 800m, former world record holder 1,000 yards
- George Sullivan, football player of the 1920s
- Justin Torres, American novelist and winner of the 2023 National Book Award for Fiction
- Alex Tuch, professional hockey player for Buffalo Sabres; first-round selection of the 2014 NHL Draft
