= Weedsport, New York =

- Village
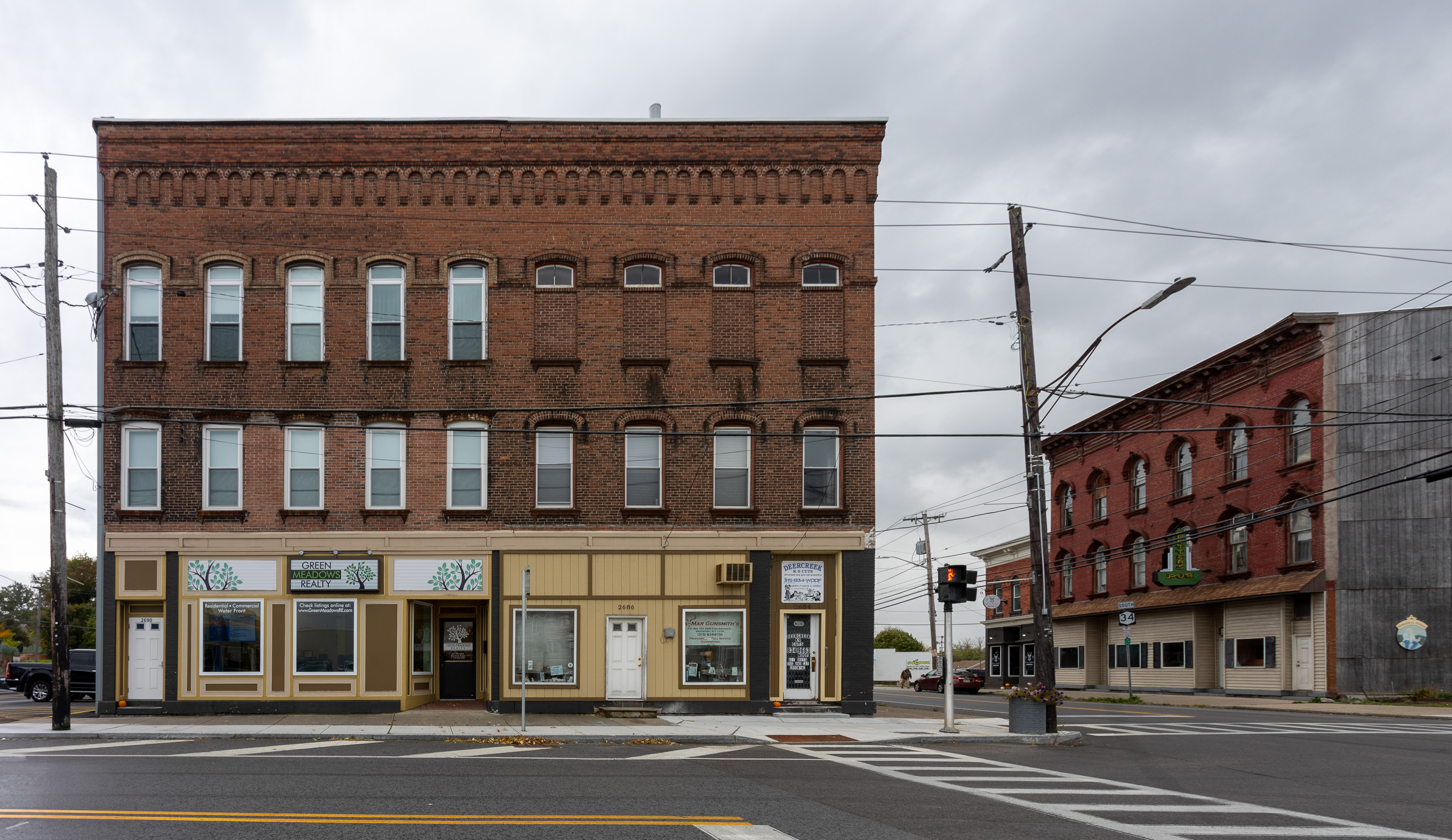
- Downtown Weedsport

- Location within the state of New York
- Coordinates: 43°3′N 76°34′W
- Country: United States
- State: New York
- County: Cayuga
- Town: Brutus

Government
  - Mayor: Chad Platten

Area
  - Total: 0.98 sq mi (2.53 km^{2})
  - Land: 0.98 sq mi (2.53 km^{2})
  - Water: 0 sq mi (0.00 km^{2})
- Elevation: 413 ft (126 m)

Population (2020)
  - Total: 1,788
  - Density: 1,832.6/sq mi (707.58/km^{2})
- Time zone: UTC-5 (Eastern (EST))
  - Summer (DST): UTC-4 (EDT)
- ZIP code: 13166
- Area code: 315
- FIPS code: 36-79015
- GNIS feature ID: 0969005
- Website: weedsport.gov

Weedsport is a village in Cayuga County, New York, United States. As of the 2020 census, Weedsport had a population of 1,788. The name is from Elihu and Edward Weed, merchants who helped found the village. Weedsport is in the town of Brutus, west of Syracuse. It was a port on the Erie Canal. Whitford's Airport is north of the village in the town of Cato.

== History ==
Weedsport was within the Central New York Military Tract. The village was originally named "Weed's Basin" because the town had a basin (boat turnaround) during the Erie Canal era. The name was then changed to Weedsport.

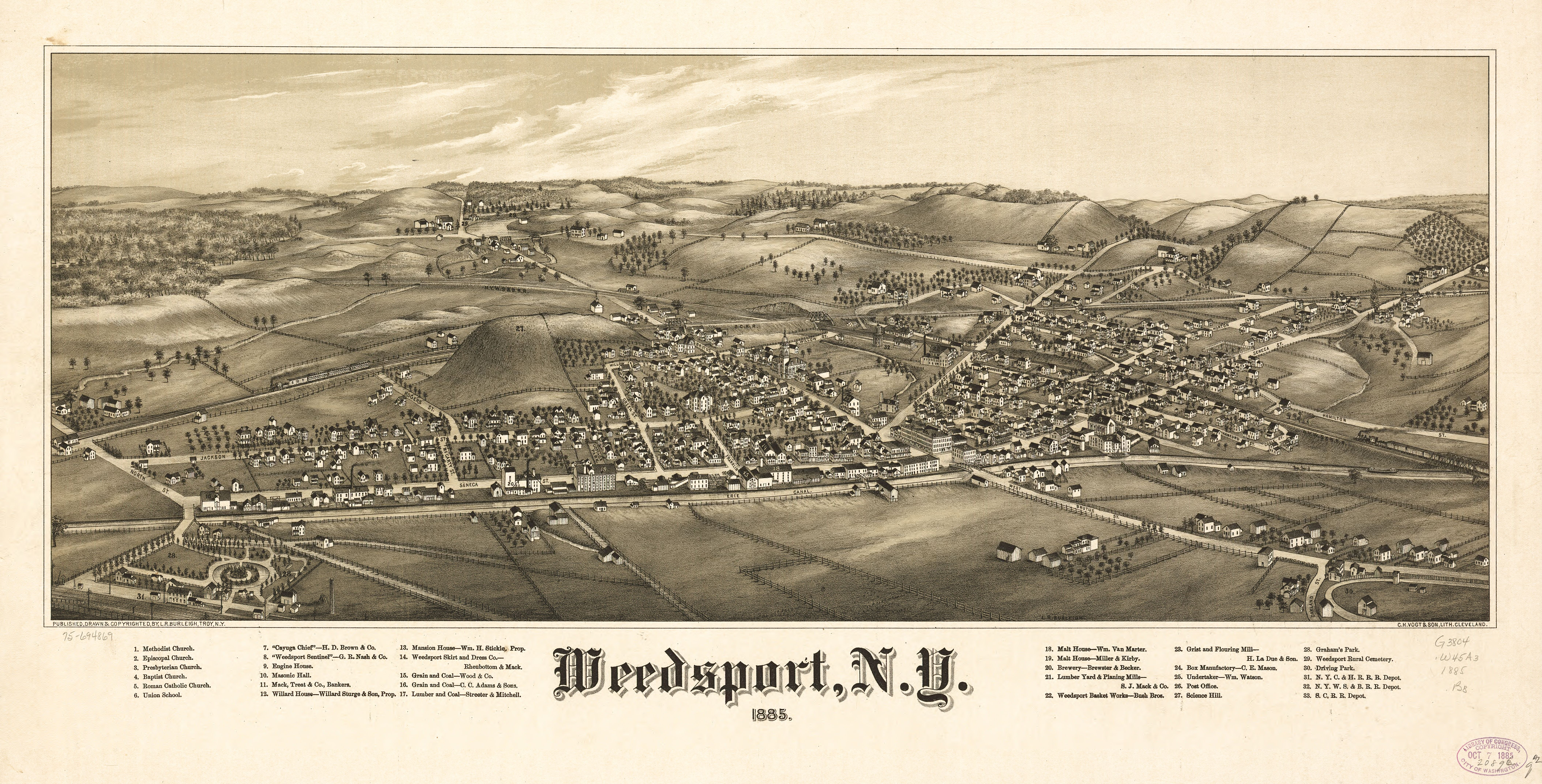
Perspective map of Weedsport and list of landmarks from 1885 by L.R. Burleigh

During the Erie Canal era, Weedsport competed with the neighboring village, Port Byron, to be an entry port for the city of Auburn. The two villages competed economically until both fell under financial troubles during the closing of their respective ports (a friendly rivalry remains to this day, mostly in local sports).

The village was incorporated in 1831.

Weedsport Elementary School was built in 1908. Renovations to the elementary school in 1986 added more classrooms, a gymnasium, and a homemaking facility. Weedsport Junior/Senior High School was built in 1957 and later expanded in 1967 and 2005.

The Centreport Aqueduct was listed on the National Register of Historic Places in 2000. The First Baptist Church of Weedsport was listed in 2002, the Orrin W. Burritt House in 2007, and the Frank and Eliza Tryon House in 2014.

== Geography ==
Weedsport is located at 43°3′N 76°34′W (43.0488, -76.5628).

According to the United States Census Bureau, the village has a total area of 0.98 square miles (2.53 km^{2}), all land.

New York State Route 31 and New York State Route 34 intersect in Weedsport. The New York State Thruway passes just north of the village, with access from Exit 40. The Erie Canal once passed through Weedsport but now follows the Seneca River one mile north of the village.

== Demographics ==
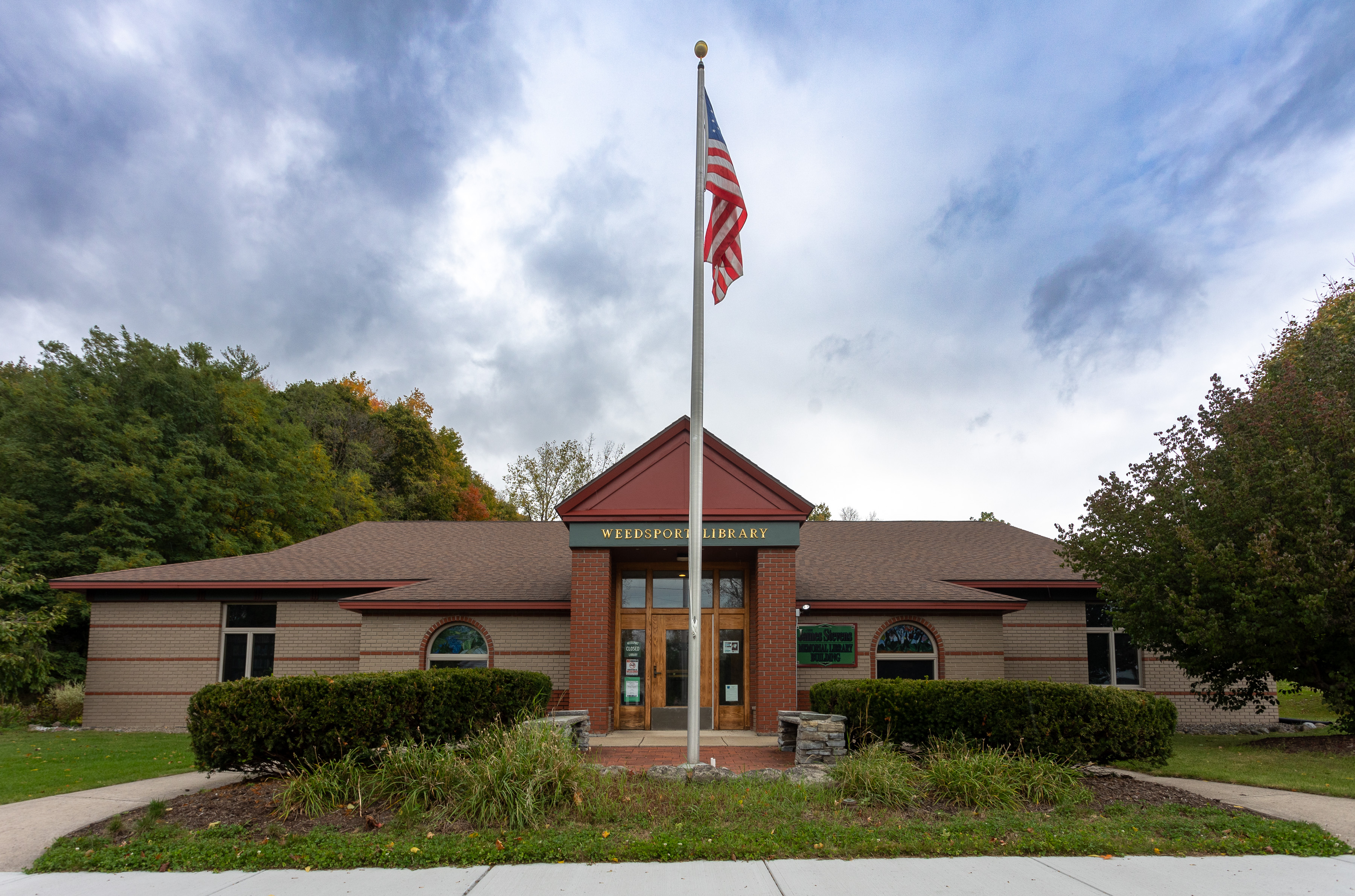
Weedsport Free Library

Historical population
Census	Pop.	Note	%±
1870	1,348		—
1880	1,411		4.7%
1890	1,580		12.0%
1900	1,525		−3.5%
1910	1,344		−11.9%
1920	1,370		1.9%
1930	1,325		−3.3%
1940	1,341		1.2%
1950	1,588		18.4%
1960	1,731		9.0%
1970	1,900		9.8%
1980	1,952		2.7%
1990	1,996		2.3%
2000	2,017		1.1%
2010	1,815		−10.0%
2020	1,788		−1.5%
U.S. Decennial Census

As of the census of 2000, there were 2,017 people, 767 households, and 524 families residing in the village. The population density was 2,069.9 inhabitants per square mile (799.2/km^{2}). There were 809 housing units at an average density of 830.2 per square mile (320.5/km^{2}). The racial makeup of the village was 100.00% White, 0.00% African American, 0.00% Native American, 0.00% Asian, 0.00% from other races, and 0.00% from two or more races. Hispanic or Latino of any race were 0.00% of the population.

There were 767 households, out of which 37.7% had children under the age of 18 living with them, 50.6% were married couples living together, 14.5% had a female householder with no husband present, and 31.6% were non-families. 26.7% of all households were made up of individuals, and 13.8% had someone living alone who was 65 years of age or older. The average household size was 2.55 and the average family size was 3.10.

In the village, the population was spread out, with 27.8% under the age of 18, 7.4% from 18 to 24, 28.2% from 25 to 44, 21.4% from 45 to 64, and 15.3% who were 65 years of age or older. The median age was 37 years. For every 100 females, there were 85.2 males. For every 100 females age 18 and over, there were 85.4 males.

The median income for a household in the village was $40,331, and the median income for a family was $45,673. Males had a median income of $36,042 versus $25,625 for females. The per capita income for the village was $18,102. About 4.1% of families and 7.1% of the population were below the poverty line, including 8.8% of those under age 18 and 2.8% of those age 65 or over.

== Education ==
It is in the Weedsport Central School District.

== Popular culture ==
Weedsport was mentioned in Episode 379 of the comedy advice podcast My Brother, My Brother and Me, "6969 Cool Street", where a lengthy discussion was had with regard to the town's name and the titular address being located therein. As a result, the address itself became an internet meme.

== Notable people ==
- Justus D. Barnes, silent film actor who played a major role in The Great Train Robbery
- Paul Parkman, American physician-scientist and virologist, one of the developers of the rubella vaccine.
- Stacey Castor, murderer
- William J. Cornwell, New York lawyer and legislator
- Jay Faatz, Major League Baseball first baseman
- James S. Havens, lawyer, Congressman and Eastman Kodak executive
- George R. Hudson, Illinois businessman and politician
- Ed Murphy, Major League Baseball pitcher
- Chauncey Purple, Wisconsin businessman and legislator
