= Van Buren, New York =

- Town
- Location in Onondaga County and the state of New York.
- Coordinates: 43°7′23″N 76°20′30″W
- Country: United States
- State: New York
- County: Onondaga

Government
  - Type: Town Council
  - Town Supervisor: Wendy Van Der Water (R)
  - Town Council: Members' List: • Derek Shepard (R); • Harold J. Johnson (R); • Mary Frances Sabin (R); • Howard Tupper (R); • Patricia A. Dickman (R); • Ronald H. Dudzinski (R)

Area
  - Total: 36.11 sq mi (93.53 km^{2})
  - Land: 35.41 sq mi (91.71 km^{2})
  - Water: 0.70 sq mi (1.82 km^{2})
- Elevation: 620 ft (189 m)

Population (2020)
  - Total: 14,367
  - Density: 405.7/sq mi (156.7/km^{2})
- Time zone: UTC-5 (Eastern (EST))
  - Summer (DST): UTC-4 (EDT)
- ZIP code: 13027
- Area code: 315
- FIPS code: 36-76760
- GNIS feature ID: 0979576
- Website: vanburenny.gov

Van Buren is a town located in Onondaga County, New York, United States. As of the 2020 Census, the population was 14,367. The town is named after then-Senator Martin Van Buren, who would later become the eighth president of the United States.

The town of Van Buren is located northwest of the city of Syracuse and is in the northwest part of the county. The portion of the town north and east of New York State Route 690 and south of the Seneca River is suburban in character, consisting primarily of single-family tract housing, some low-rise apartment buildings, park land, and some light industry. The rest of the town is primarily rural.

== History ==
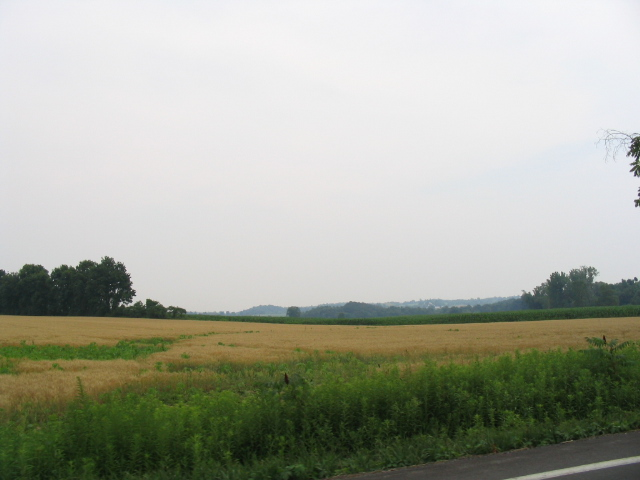
Rolling hills in Van Buren

The town was part of the Central New York Military Tract of 1789 used to pay soldiers for service in the American Revolution. Most of the soldiers chose to sell their allotments for cash so that the town was briefly in the hands of land speculators until the actual residents purchased lots. Settlement began around 1791.

The Town of Van Buren was formed in 1829 from the Town of Camillus.

== Geography ==
According to the United States Census Bureau, the town has a total area of 36.1 square miles (93 km^{2}), of which 35.6 square miles (92 km^{2}) is land and 0.6 square miles (1.6 km^{2}) (1.52%) is water.

Van Buren is bordered on the north and west by the Seneca River. Its neighbor across the river is the Town of Lysander. On the southwest, Van Buren is bordered by the Town of Elbridge; on the south, the Town of Camillus; and on the east, the Town of Geddes.

Van Buren contains the southern portion of the Village of Baldwinsville, which was incorporated in 1848. The northern part of the Village of Baldwinsville is in the Town of Lysander. The Baldwinsville Central School District, formed in 1949, includes most of the area of both Van Buren and Lysander. It also contains the hamlets and census-designated places of Seneca Knolls and Village Green.

Tri-County Mall, a former shopping center on Downer Street in Van Buren, was demolished beginning in September 2014 to make way for a residential redevelopment.

The New York State Thruway (Interstate 90) crosses the south part of Van Buren. New York State Route 690 is a limited access highway connecting with Thruway Exit 39 and bypassing Baldwinsville on the west. New York State Route 31 runs northeast–southwest through Van Buren, connecting Baldwinsville and Jordan. New York State Route 173 runs northwest—southeast, connecting Van Buren with Fairmount and Onondaga Hill. New York State Route 48 follows the course of the Seneca River in the eastern part of Van Buren; prior to the construction of Route 690, it carried much of the traffic between Baldwinsville and Syracuse. County and town roads complete the highway net.

== Demographics ==
Historical population
Census	Pop.	Note	%±
1830	2,890		—
1840	3,021		4.5%
1850	3,873		28.2%
1860	3,037		−21.6%
1870	3,038		0.0%
1880	3,091		1.7%
1890	3,444		11.4%
1900	3,297		−4.3%
1910	3,260		−1.1%
1920	3,425		5.1%
1930	3,814		11.4%
1940	3,691		−3.2%
1950	4,900		32.8%
1960	8,754		78.7%
1970	11,859		35.5%
1980	12,585		6.1%
1990	13,367		6.2%
2000	12,667		−5.2%
2010	13,185		4.1%
2020	14,367		9.0%
U.S. Decennial Census

As of the census of 2000, there were 12,667 people, 5,288 households, and 3,384 families residing in the town. The population density was 356.2 inhabitants per square mile (137.5/km^{2}). There were 5,618 housing units at an average density of 158 inhabitants per square mile (61/km^{2}). The racial makeup of the town was 97.05% White, 0.80% African American, 0.51% Native American, 0.41% Asian, 0.02% Pacific Islander, 0.17% from other races, and 1.06% from two or more races. Hispanic or Latino of any race were 0.75% of the population.

There were 5,288 households, out of which 29.0% had children under the age of 18 living with them, 50.6% were married couples living together, 9.7% had a female householder with no husband present, and 36.0% were non-families. 30.0% of all households were made up of individuals, and 11.4% had someone living alone who was 65 years of age or older. The average household size was 2.37 and the average family size was 2.95.

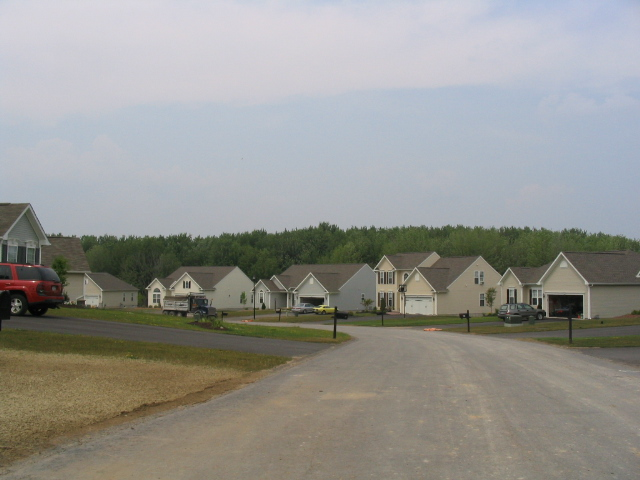
Tract housing in Van Buren

In the town, the population was spread out, with 23.6% under the age of 18, 6.2% from 18 to 24, 30.2% from 25 to 44, 25.1% from 45 to 64, and 14.9% who were 65 years of age or older. The median age was 39 years. For every 100 females, there were 91.6 males. For every 100 females age 18 and over, there were 88.3 males.

The median income for a household in the town was $43,003, and the median income for a family was $50,724. Males had a median income of $37,230 versus $26,842 for females. The per capita income for the town was $20,997. About 4.9% of families and 6.6% of the population were below the poverty line, including 7.6% of those under age 18 and 6.2% of those age 65 or over.
