= Seneca River (New York) =

River in Upstate New York

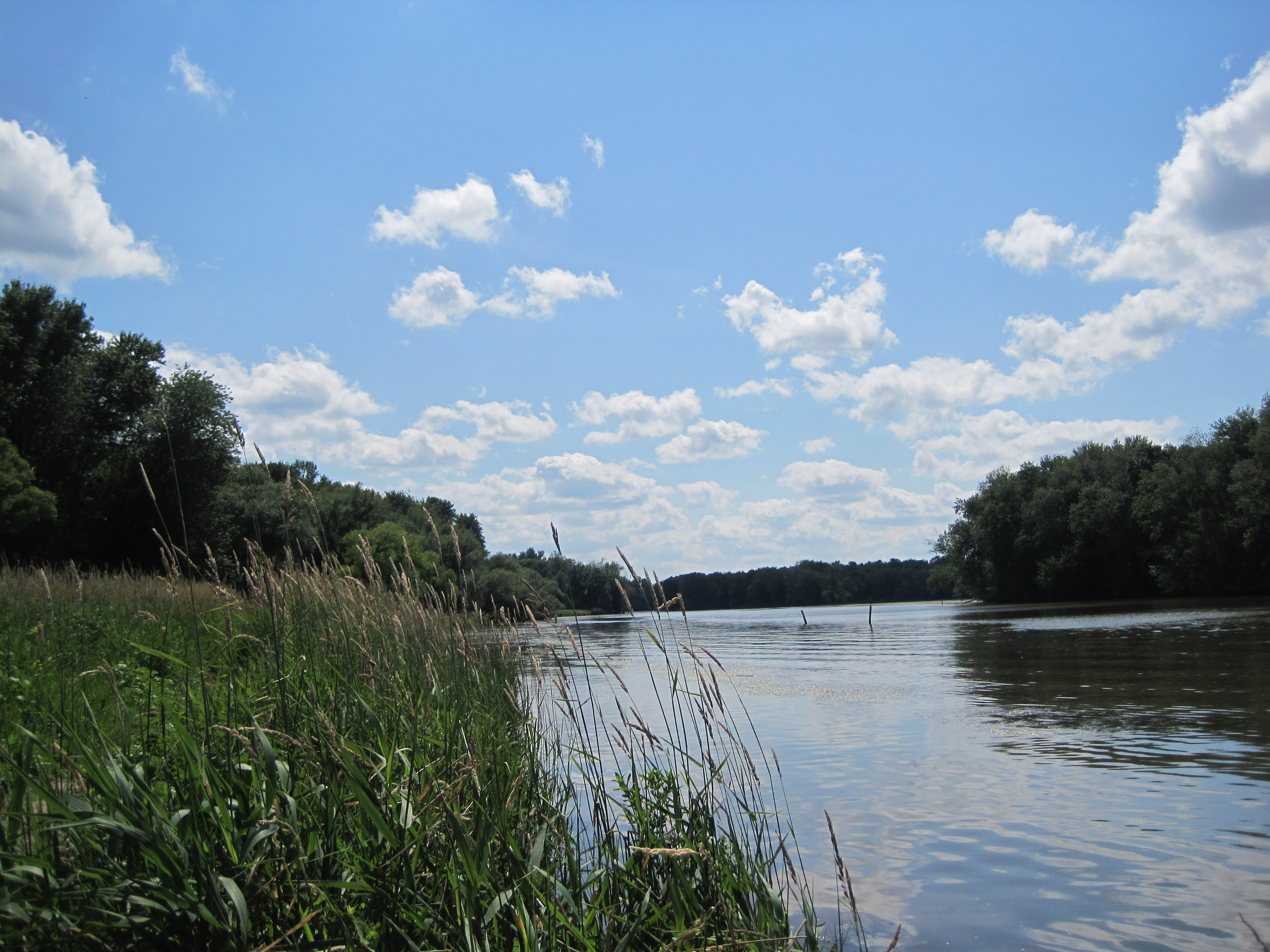
- Seneca River above Bonta Bridge in Jordan

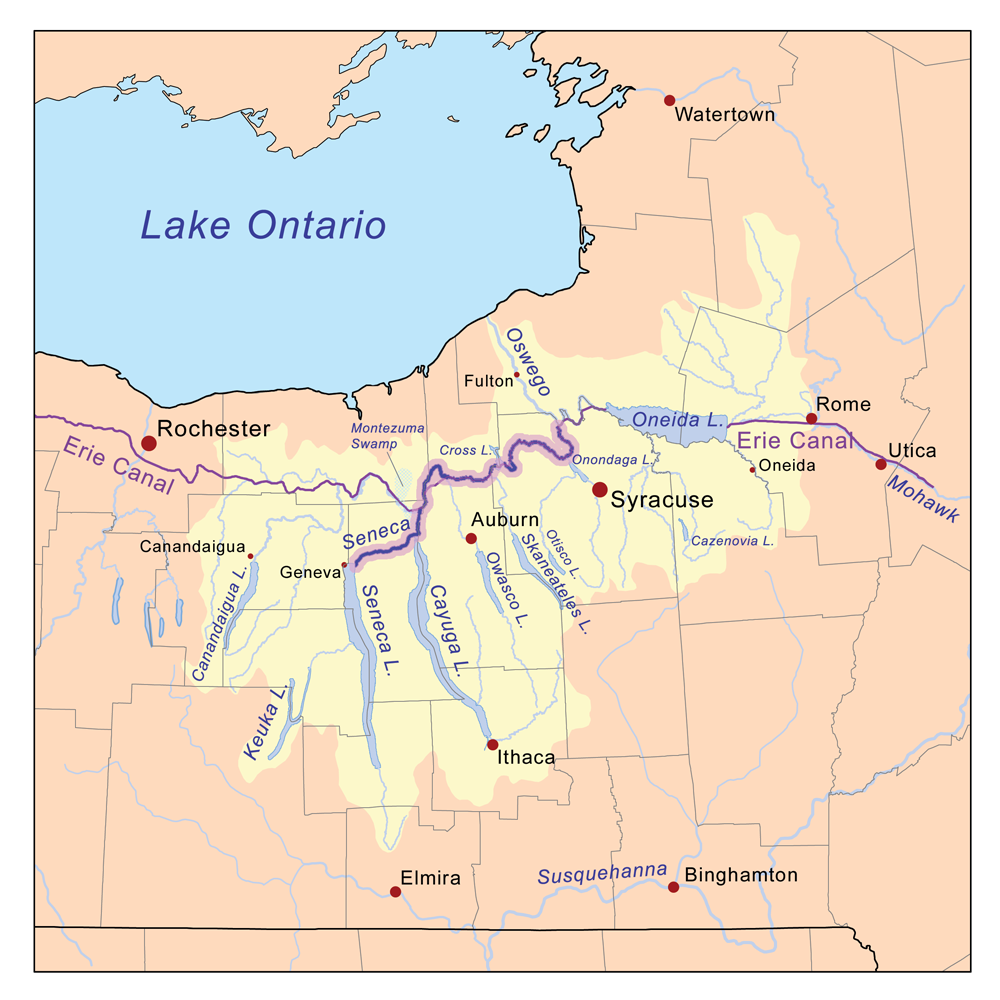
- Map of the Oswego River basin with the Seneca River highlighted

Location
- Country: United States
- State: New York

Physical characteristics
- Source: Seneca Lake
  - location: Geneva, Seneca County
  - coordinates: 42°52′05″N 76°56′27″W
  - elevation: 443 ft (135 m)
- Mouth: Oswego River
  - location: Three Rivers, Onondaga County
  - coordinates: 43°12′05″N 76°16′51″W
  - elevation: 358 ft (109 m)
- Length: 61.6 mi (99.1 km)
- Basin size: 3,468 sq mi (8,980 km^{2})
- Discharge
  - location: USGS gage #4237500 at Baldwinsville
  - average: 3,501 cu ft/s (99.1 m^{3}/s)
  - minimum: 34 cu ft/s (0.96 m^{3}/s)
  - maximum: 22,100 cu ft/s (630 m^{3}/s)

Basin features
- Tributaries
  - left: Clyde River
  - right: Cayuga Lake, Owasco River, Skaneateles Creek, Onondaga Lake

The Seneca River flows 61.6 miles (99.1 km) through the Finger Lakes region of Upstate New York in the United States. The main tributary of the Oswego River – the second-largest river flowing into Lake Ontario – the Seneca drains 3,468 square miles (8,980 km^{2}) in parts of fourteen New York counties. The Seneca flows generally east, and is wide and deep with a gentle gradient. Much of the river has been channelized to form part of the Erie Canal.

== Geography ==
The Seneca River begins at Geneva in Seneca County, as the outflow of Seneca Lake, flowing east past Waterloo and Seneca Falls. Skirting the northern end of Cayuga Lake at the Montezuma Marsh, it turns north, receiving the Clyde River from the west, forming the Seneca–Cayuga county line, then the border of Cayuga and Wayne counties. The river passes under Interstate 90, flowing northeast past Weedsport, across the middle of Cayuga County into Cross Lake.

Below Cross Lake, the Seneca River enters Onondaga County. It turns sharply north then east, past Baldwinsville and Liverpool, along the northern edge of metro Syracuse where it receives the outflow of Onondaga Lake. The river then flows north to join the Oneida River at Three Rivers on the Onondaga–Oswego County line, forming the Oswego River. From the confluence, the Oswego flows a further 23 miles (37 km) north, emptying into Lake Ontario at the city of Oswego.

The Seneca River watershed drains a total of 3,468 square miles (8,980 km^{2}), or about two-thirds of the greater Oswego River basin. There are about 4,370 miles (7,030 km) of streams in the Seneca basin. The Seneca receives the outflow of seven of the eleven Finger Lakes: Canandaigua, Keuka, Seneca, Cayuga, Owasco, Skaneateles and Otisco. Canandaigua Lake flows via the Canandaigua Outlet and the Clyde River into the Seneca River. Keuka Lake empties into Seneca Lake via the Keuka Lake Outlet. Owasco and Skaneateles Lakes join the Seneca through their eponymous outlet streams, while Otisco Lake flows via Ninemile Creek into Onondaga Lake, which in turn empties into the Seneca.

== Tributaries ==
Left
Black Brook
Clyde River
Crusoe Creek
Spring Lake Outlet
Muskrat Creek

Right
Kendig Creek
Silver Creek
Sucker Brook
Sampson Creek
Demont Creek
Cayuga Lake
Crane Brook
Owasco River
Skaneateles Creek
Dead Creek
Crooked Brook
Onondaga Lake

== History ==
=== Native Americans ===
The river is named for the Seneca people, whose traditional lands extended roughly between Lake Erie and Seneca Lake. Ska-yis-ka-ya was the name given by the Onondaga people; meaning, "Long Wing". The Onondaga inhabited the area in present-day Onondaga County, around Onondaga Lake and Syracuse, and the Cayuga inhabited the river valley and lakeshores in between. All three were part of the Iroquois League, which is believed to have been established between 1570 and 1600. For hundreds of years before the arrival of Europeans, the river was an important Native American trade route.

=== Explorers and settlers ===
The first Europeans to reach the Seneca River were likely Jesuit missionaries in the late 1600s, who established an outpost, St. Stephen, on the river shortly below its origin at Seneca Lake.

During the 18th century, the river corridor remained central to Haudenosaunee life, serving as a route between Seneca, Cayuga, and Onondaga communities and as part of a wider network of trails and waterways across what is now upstate New York.

Following the American Revolution, the area surrounding the Seneca River became part of the Military Tract lands distributed to veterans, leading to the establishment of new settlements along the river in the late 1700s and early 1800s. These communities relied on the river for transportation, local trade, and access to the growing markets of central New York.

In the early 19th century, farms, merchant outposts, and river landings developed along the Seneca River as settlers used the waterway to move goods such as grain, lumber, and livestock to regional markets. Throughout the 19th century, the river's location at the junction of several Finger Lakes made it an important connector between agricultural communities, contributing to regional trade long before modern infrastructure reshaped the waterway.

In the 20th century, as canal and industrial uses declined, the Seneca River increasingly shifted toward recreation, conservation, and residential development, becoming a key part of the modern New York State Canal System’s tourism and boating network.

=== Canalization ===
In 1821, the Seneca Lock Navigation Company completed eight locks along the upper Seneca River above Cayuga Lake to allow navigation to Seneca Lake. By 1828, this had been replaced by a state-owned waterway, the Cayuga-Seneca Canal, which contains eleven locks in 21 miles (34 km).

Construction of the Seneca reach of the Erie Canal began in the 1820s. The channel between Three Rivers and Cayuga Lake was widened and straightened to accommodate barges, and other reaches were bypassed via the construction of parallel canals. The canal path had to cross the Seneca River at several points, so locks were built to lower boats down to river level, where they were towed across aided by temporary wooden bridges. In 1849 work began to separate the canal from the river, to reduce the impact of flooding and sedimentation.

The Montezuma Marshes at the outlet of Cayuga Lake were a major obstacle to the Erie Canal path. The stone Seneca River Aqueduct (Richmond Aqueduct), which carried the canal over the Seneca and Clyde Rivers, opened in 1857 after eight years of construction. At 840 feet (260 m) it was the second-longest aqueduct on the Erie Canal system. Most of the aqueduct was dynamited in the 1910s to allow navigation on the Barge Canal.

Certain points on the Seneca River were an early center of development for industry. Seneca Falls is the location of the only significant natural drop on the river, which was utilized in the early days to power water mills. Where the river had no natural falls, mill dams were built, one of the earliest of which was at Baldwinsville. In 1915 a dam 80 feet (24 m) high was built at Seneca Falls to generate hydroelectricity.

== Ecology and environmental issues ==
Below Onondaga Lake, the Seneca River is moderately polluted by industrial and domestic waste, including high levels of mercury, PCBs, dioxin and ammonia. The New York State Department of Health advises limited consumption of fish from the lower river.

Parts of the river are infested by non-native zebra mussels, which have depleted the level of dissolved oxygen, impacting fish populations. The population density of mussels in one particular section of the river below Cross Lake is considered among the highest in North America.

The river is home to a population of common snapping turtles. In July 2001, there was a recorded attack on a 43-year-old man, near Fobes Island, who sustained minor injuries to the calf of his leg. This is the only recorded attack on humans in the river so far.

== See also ==
- List of rivers of New York
