= National Register of Historic Places listings in Seneca County, New York =

Location of Seneca County in New York

List of Registered Historic Places in Seneca County, New York

This is intended to be a complete list of properties and districts listed on the National Register of Historic Places in Seneca County, New York. The locations of National Register properties and districts (at least for all showing latitude and longitude coordinates below) may be seen in a map by clicking on "Map of all coordinates". Three properties are further designated U.S. National Historic Landmarks, and one is a U.S. National Historical Park.

This National Park Service list is complete through NPS recent listings posted May 1, 2026.

Contents: Counties in New York
Albany (Albany) – Allegany – Bronx – Broome – Cattaraugus – Cayuga – Chautauqua – Chemung – Chenango – Clinton – Columbia – Cortland – Delaware – Dutchess (Poughkeepsie, Rhinebeck) – Erie (Buffalo) – Essex – Franklin – Fulton – Genesee – Greene – Hamilton – Herkimer – Jefferson – Kings – Lewis – Livingston – Madison – Monroe (Rochester) – Montgomery – Nassau – New York (Below 14th Street, 14th to 59th Streets, 59th to 110th Streets, Above 110th Street, Islands) – Niagara (Niagara Falls) – Oneida – Onondaga (Syracuse) – Ontario – Orange – Orleans – Oswego – Otsego – Putnam – Queens – Rensselaer – Richmond – Rockland – St. Lawrence – Saratoga – Schenectady – Schoharie – Schuyler – Seneca – Steuben – Suffolk – Sullivan – Tioga – Tompkins – Ulster – Warren – Washington – Wayne – Westchester (Northern, Southern, New Rochelle, Peekskill, Yonkers) – Wyoming – Yates

== Listings county-wide ==
| | Name on the Register | Image | Date listed | Location | City or town | Description |
|---|---|---|---|---|---|---|
| 1 | Amelia Bloomer House | Amelia Bloomer House | August 29, 1980 (#80000359) | 53 E. Bayard St. 42°54′35″N 76°47′27″W | Seneca Falls | |
| 2 | Julius and Harriet Bull House | Julius and Harriet Bull House | August 30, 2007 (#07000869) | 2534 Lower Lake Rd. 42°54′14″N 76°45′05″W | Seneca Falls | |
| 3 | William H. Burton House | William H. Burton House | June 14, 1996 (#96000675) | 35 E. Main St. 42°54′16″N 76°51′41″W | Waterloo | |
| 4 | Christ Evangelical and Reformed Church | | December 8, 1989 (#89002092) | Main St. 42°48′52″N 76°47′51″W | Fayette | |
| 5 | Cobblestone Farmhouse at 1027 Stone Church Rd. | Cobblestone Farmhouse at 1027 Stone Church Rd. | September 28, 2007 (#07001017) | 1027 Stone Church Rd. 42°58′34″N 76°53′05″W | Junius | |
| 6 | Cobblestone Farmhouse at 1111 Stone Church Road | Cobblestone Farmhouse at 1111 Stone Church Road | September 28, 2007 (#07001018) | 1111 Stone Church Rd. 42°58′19″N 76°52′57″W | Junius | |
| 7 | Cobblestone Farmhouse at 1229 Birdsey Road | Cobblestone Farmhouse at 1229 Birdsey Road | August 6, 2008 (#08000772) | 1229 Birdsey Rd. 42°58′01″N 76°51′51″W | Junius | |
| 8 | Covert Historic District | Covert Historic District | November 21, 1980 (#80002766) | NY 96; 42°34′22″N 76°41′01″W | Covert | |
| 9 | Fall Street-Trinity Lane Historic District | Fall Street-Trinity Lane Historic District | February 11, 1974 (#74001306) | Address Restricted | Seneca Falls | |
| 10 | First Baptist Church of Interlaken | First Baptist Church of Interlaken | December 31, 2002 (#02001655) | 8414 Main St. 42°36′59″N 76°43′32″W | Interlaken | |
| 11 | First Presbyterian Church | First Presbyterian Church | November 29, 1996 (#96001386) | E. Main St., east of the junction with NY 96; 42°54′14″N 76°51′39″W | Waterloo | |
| 12 | Edith B. Ford Memorial Library | Edith B. Ford Memorial Library | May 25, 2018 (#100002514) | 7169 Main St. 42°40′38″N 76°49′20″W | Ovid | 1961 modernist building typifies the New Formalist subgenre of the style |
| 13 | Fourth Ward School | Fourth Ward School | March 19, 1986 (#86000474) | 8 Washington St. 42°54′38″N 76°47′21″W | Seneca Falls | |
| 14 | John Graves Cobblestone Farmhouse | John Graves Cobblestone Farmhouse | February 28, 2008 (#08000107) | 1370 NY 318; 42°57′35″N 76°52′21″W | Junius | |
| 15 | William Hoster House | William Hoster House | December 31, 2002 (#02001662) | 3832 NY 414; 42°50′17″N 76°48′41″W | Fayette | |
| 16 | Hunt House | Hunt House | August 29, 1980 (#80000358) | 401 E. Main St. 42°54′22″N 76°50′40″W | Waterloo | |
| 17 | The Huntington Building | | November 3, 2022 (#100008335) | 201 Fall St. 42°54′37″N 76°48′21″W | Seneca Falls | |
| 18 | Hannah and George W. Jones House | | December 1, 2020 (#100005847) | 7246 Main St. 42°40′24″N 76°49′25″W | Ovid | |
| 19 | David and Mary Kinne Farmstead | David and Mary Kinne Farmstead | August 30, 2007 (#07000865) | 6858 Kinne Rd. 42°41′34″N 76°50′34″W | Ovid | |
| 20 | Hiram Lay Cobblestone Farmhouse | Hiram Lay Cobblestone Farmhouse | September 20, 2009 (#09000724) | 1145 Mays Point Rd. 42°58′08″N 76°46′30″W | Tyre | Another Cobblestone Architecture of New York State MPS listing |
| 21 | Lodi Methodist Church | Lodi Methodist Church | May 6, 1982 (#82003405) | S. Main and Grove Sts. 42°36′45″N 76°49′22″W | Lodi | |
| 22 | M'Clintock House | M'Clintock House | August 29, 1980 (#80000360) | 14 E. Williams; 42°54′19″N 76°51′42″W | Waterloo | |
| 23 | New York State Barge Canal | New York State Barge Canal | October 15, 2014 (#14000860) | Linear across county 42°54′33″N 76°47′55″W | Seneca Falls, Tyre, Waterloo | Cayuga–Seneca Canal; Successor to Erie Canal approved by state voters in early 20th century to compete with railroads. |
| 24 | Queen's Castle | | June 1, 1999 (#99000564) | NY 414; 42°33′03″N 76°52′54″W | Lodi | |
| 25 | Simon Ritter Cobblestone Farmhouse | | November 18, 2008 (#08001081) | 5102 NY 89; 42°46′39″N 76°46′11″W | Varick | |
| 26 | Rose Hill Mansion | Rose Hill Mansion | February 6, 1973 (#73001269) | West of Fayette on NY 96A; 42°51′38″N 76°56′18″W | Fayette | |
| 27 | Saint Paul's Church | Saint Paul's Church | March 9, 1997 (#97000115) | 101 E. Williams St. 42°54′20″N 76°51′35″W | Waterloo | |
| 28 | Seneca County Courthouse Complex at Ovid | Seneca County Courthouse Complex at Ovid | December 12, 1976 (#76001277) | NY 414; 42°40′36″N 76°49′19″W | Ovid | |
| 29 | Seneca Falls Village Historic District | Seneca Falls Village Historic District | April 5, 1991 (#91000342) | Roughly, properties along State and Cayuga Sts. from Butler and Auburn to Canal St., including Van Cleef Lake; 42°54′52″N 76°47′41″W | Seneca Falls | |
| 30 | Seneca River Crossing Canals Historic District | Seneca River Crossing Canals Historic District | December 9, 2005 (#05001397) | Off NY 90; 43°00′32″N 76°42′45″W | Tyre | Extends into Montezuma in Cayuga County |
| 31 | Elizabeth Cady Stanton House | Elizabeth Cady Stanton House | October 15, 1966 (#66000572) | 32 Washington St. 42°54′45″N 76°47′18″W | Seneca Falls | |
| 32 | United Methodist Church | United Methodist Church | September 24, 2004 (#04001057) | 21 E. Williams St. 42°54′28″N 76°51′40″W | Waterloo | |
| 33 | US Post Office-Seneca Falls | US Post Office-Seneca Falls | May 11, 1989 (#88002431) | 34-42 State St. 42°54′42″N 76°47′54″W | Seneca Falls | |
| 34 | US Post Office-Waterloo | US Post Office-Waterloo | May 11, 1989 (#88002442) | 2 E. Main St. 42°54′15″N 76°51′46″W | Waterloo | |
| 35 | Waterloo Downtown Historic District | Waterloo Downtown Historic District | April 17, 2017 (#100000895) | 1-42 E. Main, 1-40 W. Main & 16-41 Virginia Sts. 42°54′17″N 76°51′46″W | Waterloo | Early 19th- to mid-20th century buildings at intersection town grew around |
| 36 | Waterloo High School | | May 20, 2019 (#100003933) | 202–206 W. Main St. 42°54′18″N 76°52′04″W | Waterloo | Intact 1928–29 school, now an elementary school, designed by Rochester architect Carl Ade, reflecting progressive education trends of the time, with space for vocational training |
| 37 | Waterloo Library | Waterloo Library | June 14, 1996 (#96000676) | 31 Williams St. 42°54′20″N 76°51′40″W | Waterloo | |
| 38 | James Russell Webster House | James Russell Webster House | December 11, 2007 (#07001255) | 115 E. Main St. 42°54′15″N 76°51′33″W | Waterloo | |
| 39 | Wesleyan Methodist Church | Wesleyan Methodist Church | August 29, 1980 (#80000361) | 126 Fall St. 42°57′45″N 76°50′46″W | Seneca Falls | |
| 40 | Willard Asylum for the Chronic Insane | Willard Asylum for the Chronic Insane | March 7, 1975 (#75001229) | Willard State Psychiatric Center; 42°40′45″N 76°52′46″W | Willard | |
| 41 | Aaron Wilson House | Aaron Wilson House | May 30, 2001 (#01000577) | 2037 Wilson Rd. 42°38′48″N 76°49′55″W | Ovid | |
| 42 | Women's Rights National Historical Park | Women's Rights National Historical Park | December 28, 1980 (#80004397) | 136 Fall St. 42°54′39″N 76°48′00″W | Seneca Falls | |

== See also ==
- National Register of Historic Places listings in New York
