= Waterloo (village), New York =

Waterloo
- Village
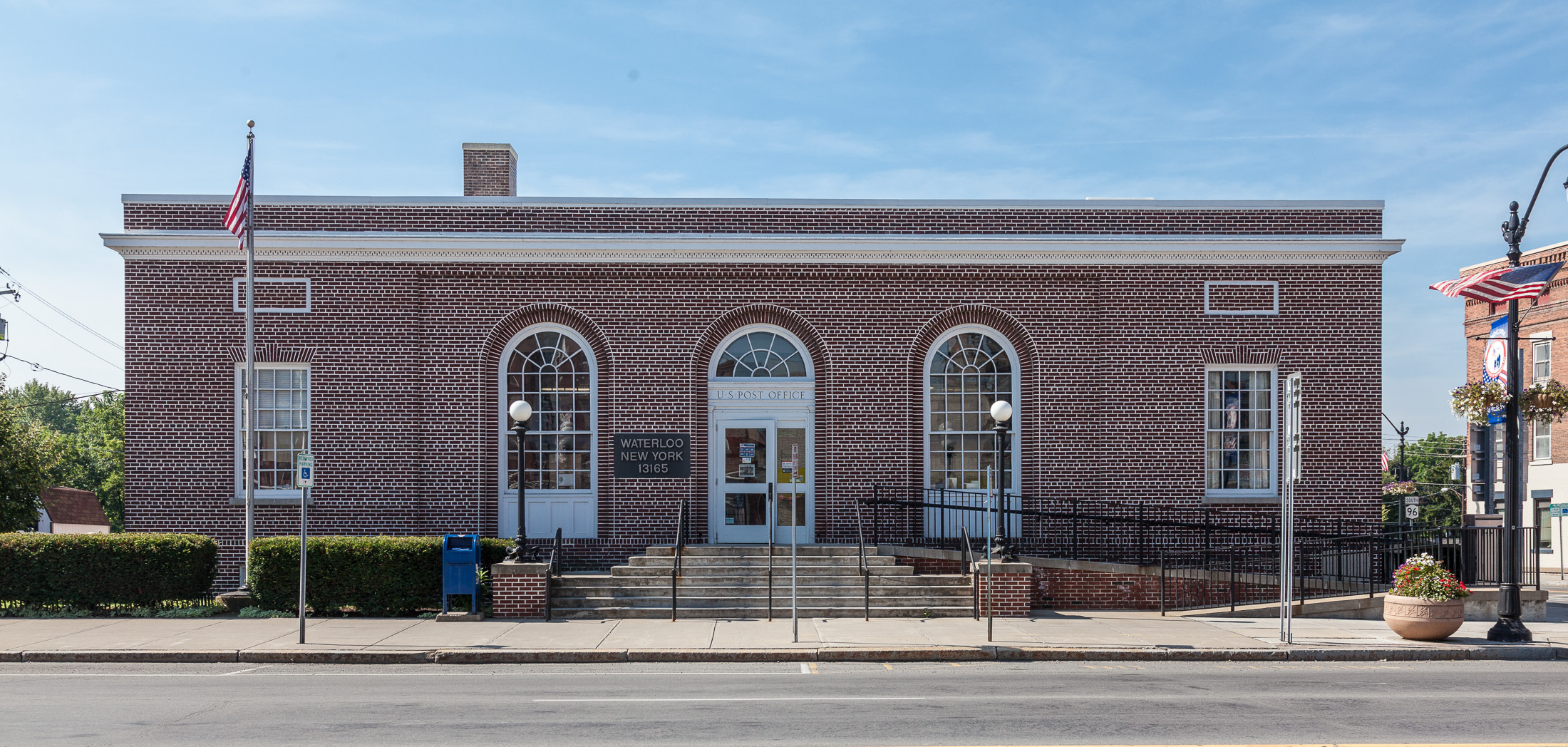
- United States Post Office (Waterloo, New York)
- Nickname: waterloo
- Location within the state of New York
- Coordinates: 42°54′13″N 76°51′34″W
- Country: United States
- State: New York
- County: Seneca
- Town(s): Waterloo and Fayette
- Incorporated: April 9, 1824; 202 years ago

Government
  - Type: Board of Trustees
  - Mayor: Walter Bennett
  - Clerk: Don Northrup
  - Court: Justice Conrad A. Struzik

Area
  - Total: 2.20 sq mi (5.71 km^{2})
  - Land: 2.16 sq mi (5.59 km^{2})
  - Water: 0.046 sq mi (0.12 km^{2})
- Elevation: 453 ft (138 m)

Population (2020)
  - Total: 4,810
  - Density: 2,230.0/sq mi (860.99/km^{2})
- Time zone: UTC-5 (Eastern (EST))
  - Summer (DST): UTC-4 (EDT)
- ZIP code: 13165
- Area codes: 315 and 680
- FIPS code: 36-78553
- GNIS feature ID: 0968900
- Website: http://www.waterloony.com/

Waterloo is a village and primary county seat of Seneca County, New York, United States. The population was 5,171 at the 2010 census and is now the most populated village in Seneca County. The village is named after Waterloo, Belgium, where Napoleon was defeated. It is the primary county seat of Seneca County, with the other being Ovid as part of a two-shire system established in 1822. Most of the county administrative offices are located in the village. Therefore, many political sources only list Waterloo as the county seat.

The Village of Waterloo is mostly in the Town of Waterloo, but the part south of the Cayuga-Seneca Canal of the village is in the Town of Fayette and a small area in the southeast of the village is in Town of Seneca Falls. Waterloo is east of Geneva and is located in between the two main Finger Lakes, Seneca Lake and Cayuga Lake.

== History ==
The area was within the realm of the Cayuga nation, one of several bands to form the Iroquois League. The current site of the village was the location of the former Cayuga village "Skoiyase" (or Skoi-Yase), meaning "flowing water", which was established around 1500. They were visited by Jesuit missionaries in the 17th century. After the Sullivan Expedition of 1779 destroyed Skoiyase, many natives left the area. The land then became part of the Central New York Military Tract, reserved for veterans.

The first new settler, Jabez Gorham, arrived on the site of the village around 1795. The early village was known as "New Hudson". It was also known as "Scoys", based on the name of the former Native American village.

Because the original county seat in Ovid was deemed too close to the south county line after land was lost from Seneca County, Waterloo became the county seat in 1819. A similar fate befell Waterloo, when much of the north of Seneca County was lost, leaving the village close to the northern county line. The outcome was that both villages were made joint county seats, even though some of the lost towns were later returned to the county. Seneca County remains a two-shire county, although nearly all government activity now occurs in Waterloo. In honor of the two-shire history, the County Board of Supervisors will at least once a year hold a meeting in Ovid at the buildings locally called the "Three Bears".

Planning for the Women's Rights Convention in 1848 in Seneca Falls took place in Waterloo.

The Village of Waterloo was incorporated in 1824 and again in 1866, the same year it celebrated the first Memorial Day. Waterloo was officially designated as the birthplace of Memorial Day in 1966 by President Lyndon B. Johnson. The Memorial Day Museum is in the village. However, in 2014, Bellware and Gardiner challenged this designation in The Genesis of the Memorial Day Holiday in America. They uncovered evidence that the origin story is a hoax including information ignored by the Centennial Committee backing the proclamation. This includes a report in a New York newspaper that predates by several years any of the sources used by the committee. It describes, in detail, Waterloo's first Memorial Day and places it in 1868. They also note other inconsistencies between the historical record and the story compiled by the Centennial Committee and the lack of discussion or debate in Congress prior to the resolution recognizing Waterloo as the birthplace of the holiday.

== Geography ==
Waterloo is located at 42°54′13″N 76°51′34″W (42.903697, -76.859517).

According to the United States Census Bureau, the village has a total area of 2.2 square miles (5.6 km^{2}), of which, 2.1 square miles (5.4 km^{2}) of it is land and 0.1 square miles (0.2 km^{2}) of it (3.24%) is water.

The Seneca River/Cayuga-Seneca Canal pass through the village, linking the area to the Erie Canal system.

US Route 20, conjoined with New York State Route 5, intersects New York State Route 96 in the village.

The largest active landfill in New York State, Seneca Meadows, is northeast of Waterloo in the town of Seneca Falls.

== National Register of Historic Places listings in Waterloo ==
Landmark name	Image	Date listed	Location	Summary
William H. Burton House		June 14, 1996	35 E. Main St. 42°54′16″N 76°51′41″W	
First Presbyterian Church		November 29, 1996	E. Main St., E of jct. with NY 96; 42°54′14″N 76°51′39″W	
Hunt House	Jane Hunt House	August 29, 1980	401 E. Main St. 42°54′22″N 76°50′40″W	Historic home, c. 1830, part of Women's Rights National Historical Park
M'Clintock House	Richard Hunt House	August 29, 1980	14 E. Williams; 42°54′19″N 76°51′42″W	Historic home, important to the first Women's Rights Convention, part of Women's Rights National Historical Park
Saint Paul's Church		March 9, 1997	101 E. Williams St. 42°54′20″N 76°51′35″W	
United Methodist Church		September 24, 2004	21 E. Williams St. 42°54′28″N 76°51′40″W	
U.S. Post Office		May 11, 1989	2 E. Main St. 42°54′15″N 76°51′46″W	
Waterloo Library		June 14, 1996	31 E. Williams St. 42°54′20″N 76°51′40″W	
James Russell Webster House		December 11, 2007	115 E. Main St. 42°54′23″N 76°51′33″W	Historic home, c. 1850–1855.

== Demographics ==
Historical population
Census	Pop.	Note	%±
1860	3,375		—
1870	4,086		21.1%
1880	3,893		−4.7%
1890	4,350		11.7%
1900	4,256		−2.2%
1910	3,931		−7.6%
1920	3,809		−3.1%
1930	4,047		6.2%
1940	4,010		−0.9%
1950	4,438		10.7%
1960	5,098		14.9%
1970	5,418		6.3%
1980	5,303		−2.1%
1990	5,116		−3.5%
2000	5,111		−0.1%
2010	5,171		1.2%
2020	4,810		−7.0%
U.S. Decennial Census

As of the census of 2010, there were 5,171 people, 2,039 households, and 1,323 families residing in the village. The population density was 2,462.4 inhabitants per square mile (950.7/km^{2}). The racial makeup of the village was 96.6% White, 1.1% Black or African American, 0.0% Native American, 0.4% Asian, 0.0% Pacific Islander, 0.2% from other races, and 1.6% from two or more races. Hispanic or Latino of any race were 2.2% of the population.

There were 2,039 households, out of which 28.0% had children under the age of 18 living with them, 43.8% were married couples living together, 14.9% had a female householder with no husband present, and 35.1% were non-families. 29.1% of all households were made up of individuals, and 12.8% had someone living alone who was 65 years of age or older. The average household size was 2.39 and the average family size was 2.88.

In the village, the population was spread out, with 24.5% under the age of 20, 6.1% from 20 to 24, 22.8% from 25 to 44, 26.3% from 45 to 64, and 20.4% who were 65 years of age or older. The median age was 42.3 years. For every 100 females, there were 86.5 males. For every 100 females age 18 and over, there were 84.2 males.

The median income for a household in the village was $48,214, and the median income for a family was $65,709. Males had a median income of $43,393 versus $27,328 for females. The per capita income for the village was $23,777. About 5.5% of families and 10.6% of the population were below the poverty line, including 11.3% of those under age 18 and 5.9% of those age 65 or over.

=== Housing ===
There were 2,164 housing units at an average density of 1,030.5 per square mile (397.9/km^{2}). 5.8% of housing units were vacant.

There were 2,039 occupied housing units in the village. 1,424 were owner-occupied units (69.8%), while 615 were renter-occupied (30.2%). The homeowner vacancy rate was 1.4% of total units. The rental unit vacancy rate was 7.5%.

== Notable people ==
- Tom Coughlin, two time NFL Super Bowl Champion New York Giants' coach was born in Waterloo in 1946.
- George Bradshaw Kelly, U.S. Representative for New York's 38th congressional district, from 1937 to 1939.
- Mike McLaughlin, former NASCAR driver
- Charles E. Stuart, U.S. Representative and Senator from Michigan.
- Kevin Sylvester – radio host on WGR for the Buffalo Sabres.
