= Henry C. Welles =

American businessman who was thought one of the founders of Memorial day

Henry Carter Welles
- Born: May 13, 1821; Glastonbury, Connecticut, United States
- Died: July 7, 1868 (aged 47)
- Occupations: Druggist, businessman
- Known for: Thought of as one of the founders of Memorial Day
- Spouse: Josephine Shotwell (m. 1857)
- Children: 2

Henry Carter Welles (May 13, 1821 – July 7, 1868) was an American druggist and businessman. He is thought of as one of the founders of Memorial Day, along with former Union General John B. Murray.

== Early life ==
Welles was born in Glastonbury, Connecticut, in 1821 to Henry and Sila Welles. She was a distant cousin of her husband and shared the same last name. Henry’s father died when he was young and his mother moved the family to Waterloo, New York, where her brother Gardner Welles worked as a physician.

== Career ==
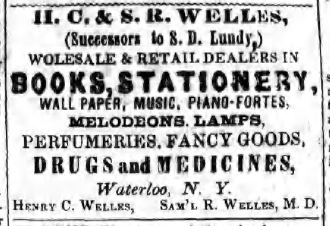
Advertisement for the drugstore of Henry C. and Samuel R. Welles of Waterloo, NY, in the Ovid Bee, September 19, 1855, page 3

Welles went into the drug business with his cousin, Dr. Samuel R. Welles by 1855. He married Josephine Shotwell in 1857 and had two children, Sterling Hadley Welles and Helen Lavanche Welles, both of whom died in 1861. His cousin left the firm in 1858 but Henry continued with the drug store until he died in Waterloo on July 7, 1868.

== Presidential proclamation ==
President Lyndon Johnson proclaimed Waterloo the birthplace of the holiday following the passage of House Concurrent Resolution (HCR) 587 in 1966. The resolution and proclamation were based on research done by eight members of the community who comprised the Research Committee of the Waterloo Memorial Day Centennial Committee. Their purpose was to promote the centennial of the founding of Memorial Day on May 5, 1866. The holiday was supposedly conceived by Welles, who communicated the idea to Murray, the county clerk who helped carry it out.

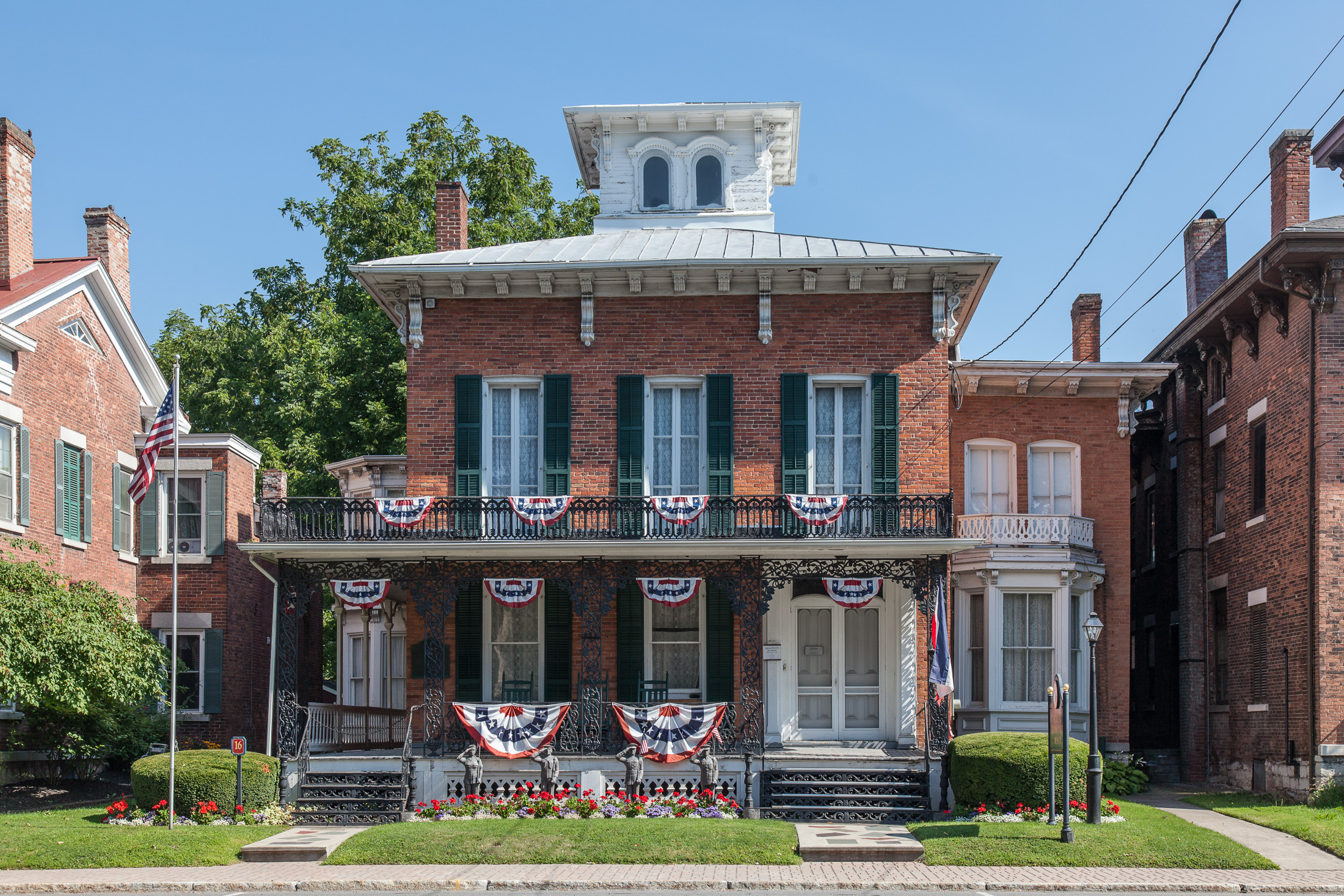
William H. Burton house, location of the National Memorial Day Museum, Waterloo, New York

== Myth exposed ==
In 2014, almost fifty years after the Presidential proclamation, Bellware and Gardiner published The Genesis of the Memorial Day Holiday in America, which refutes the claim. According to the Waterloo Centennial Research Committee, there were no contemporaneous reports of this celebration. The earliest sources date from 1882, sixteen years after the event. The Waterloo legend states clearly that the founder, Henry C. Welles, died five weeks after he inaugurated that first Memorial Day in Waterloo in 1866. However, Welles died on July 7, 1868, according to his gravestone and the Waterloo Observer, July 8, 1868. Bellware and Gardiner credit Mary Ann Williams and the Ladies Memorial Association of Columbus, Georgia, as the true originators of the holiday as abundant contemporaneous evidence from across the nation exists to substantiate the claim.

In 2016, VFW Magazine featured an article by Doris Wolf in recognition of the 150th anniversary of Waterloo's Memorial Day observance. The editors added a note at the beginning of the article advising the readers of the existence of Bellware and Gardiner's book, that the Columbus, Georgia event of April 26, 1866 predated the Waterloo event by nine days and that the article on Waterloo was being presented to provoke historical inquiry.

In 2019, the hoax was further explored (and exposed) by author Marshall S. Berdan in Welles’ hometown of Glastonbury, CT. His article in The Glastonbury Citizen recounts Berdan’s disenchantment with the story after the staff of Waterloo’s National Memorial Day Museum was unable to provide the definitive evidence he sought prior to the placement of a plaque honoring Welles in Glastonbury. It also mentions some of Berdan's own research used to debunk the myth.
