= Fourth Ward School =

Fourth Ward School may refer to:

- Fourth Ward School (Virginia City, Nevada), an NRHP contributing property in the Virginia City Historic District
- Fourth Ward School (Seneca Falls, New York), on the National Register of Historic Places listings in Seneca County, New York
- Fourth Ward School (San Antonio, Texas), on the National Register of Historic Places listings in Bexar County, Texas
- Fourth Ward School (Morgantown, West Virginia) on the National Register of Historic Places listings in Monongalia County, West Virginia

== See also ==
- Ward School (disambiguation)
