= Ovid (village), New York =

Ovid, New York
- Village
- Location within the state of New York
- Coordinates: 42°40.5′N 76°49.6′W
- Country: United States
- State: New York
- County: Seneca
- Town: Ovid
- Incorporated: April 17, 1816 (Dissolved in 1849, Re-Incorporated in 1852)

Government
  - Type: Board of Trustees
  - Mayor: Leon Kelly
  - Clerk: Cathy Kerns

Area
  - Total: 0.40 sq mi (1.03 km^{2})
  - Land: 0.40 sq mi (1.03 km^{2})
  - Water: 0 sq mi (0.00 km^{2})
- Elevation: 968 ft (295 m)

Population (2020)
  - Total: 534
  - Density: 1,343.2/sq mi (518.62/km^{2})
- Time zone: UTC-5 (Eastern (EST))
  - Summer (DST): UTC-4 (EDT)
- ZIP code: 14521
- Area code: 607
- FIPS code: 36-55816
- GNIS feature ID: 0959663
- Website: https://villageofovid.com/

Ovid is a village in Seneca County, New York, United States. The population was 602 at the 2010 census. The town was named by a clerk interested in the classics (see Ovid).

The Village of Ovid is within the Town of Ovid, but a small portion is in the Town of Romulus, and is southeast of Geneva, New York.

== History ==
Ovid and the surrounding area was part the lands controlled by the Iroquois. The Sullivan Expedition of 1779 drove away or killed many of these natives to reduce their raiding in support of the British. After the American Revolution the village was in the Central New York Military Tract, used to compensate soldiers.

Ovid was the first county seat of Seneca County, and a courthouse was erected in 1806. When adjacent towns were created from Ovid and placed in other counties, Ovid was seen as being too far from the county center, and Waterloo became the county seat. Later, Waterloo itself became located on the northern fringe of the county when new towns created there were assigned to new counties. The ultimate solution was to make both Ovid and Waterloo county seats.

The village was incorporated in 1816, but dissolved in 1849, and then re-incorporated in 1852.

The David and Mary Kinne Farmstead, Seneca County Courthouse Complex at Ovid, Edith B. Ford Memorial Library and Aaron Wilson House are listed on the National Register of Historic Places.

On 21 January 2025, a massive fire broke out in an apartment above the Big M Market on the village's Main Street. Over 200 firefighters responded to the fire and were on scene for more than nine hours. Authorities later determined that a charging device plugged into an electrical outlet in an apartment above the Big M store was the cause of the fire. Five businesses were destroyed along with 60 associated jobs, and 15 to 20 people in 10 apartments lost their homes.

== Geography ==
Ovid is located at 42°40.5′N 76°49.6′W (42.6775, -76.8243).

According to the United States Census Bureau, the village has a total area of 0.4 square miles (1.1 km^{2}), none of which is covered with water.

The village is in the Finger Lakes District, lying between Cayuga Lake and Seneca Lake.

New York State Route 96, New York State Route 96A, and New York State Route 414, along with County Road 139, converge at the village.

Simpson Creek flows through the village to Seneca Lake.

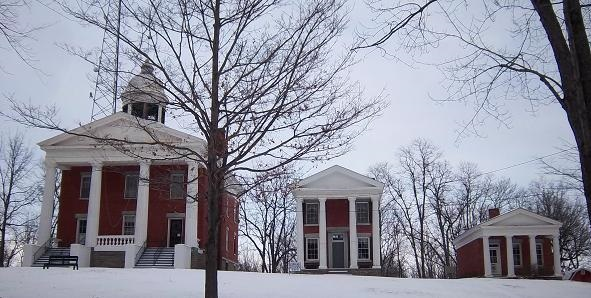
Seneca County Courthouse Complex at Ovid

== Demographics ==
Historical population
Census	Pop.	Note	%±
1860	760		—
1870	724		−4.7%
1880	705		−2.6%
1890	641		−9.1%
1900	624		−2.7%
1910	548		−12.2%
1920	438		−20.1%
1930	537		22.6%
1940	578		7.6%
1950	646		11.8%
1960	789		22.1%
1970	779		−1.3%
1980	666		−14.5%
1990	660		−0.9%
2000	612		−7.3%
2010	602		−1.6%
2020	534		−11.3%
U.S. Decennial Census

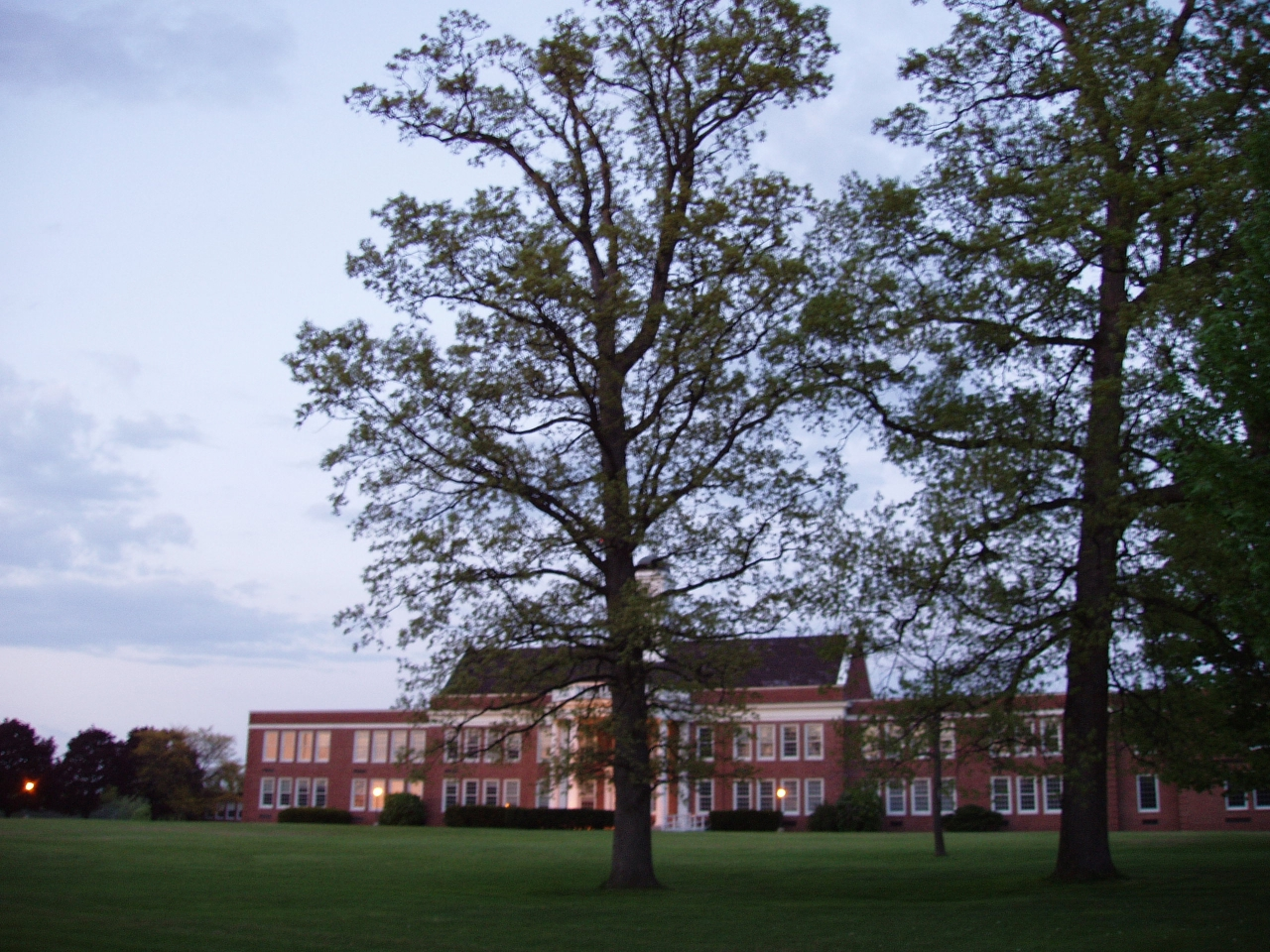
South Seneca Junior/Senior High School (In Ovid)

As of the census of 2010, there were 602 people, 251 households, and 145 families residing in the village. The population density was 1,505.0 inhabitants per square mile (581.1/km^{2}). The racial makeup of the village was 93.7% White, 1.7% Black or African American, 0.2% Native American, 0.8% Asian, 0.0% Pacific Islander, 1.2% from other races, and 2.5% from two or more races. Hispanic or Latino of any race were 2.3% of the population.

There were 251 households, out of which 25.5% had children under the age of 18 living with them, 35.9% were married couples living together, 15.5% had a female householder with no husband present, and 42.2% were non-families. 33.1% of all households were made up of individuals, and 15.2% had someone living alone who was 65 years of age or older. The average household size was 2.37 and the average family size was 3.02.

In the village, the population was spread out, with 25.0% under the age of 20, 7.6% from 20 to 24, 24.4% from 25 to 44, 27.1% from 45 to 64, and 15.9% who were 65 years of age or older. The median age was 39.3 years. For every 100 females, there were 93.6 males. For every 100 females age 18 and over, there were 87.6 males.

The median income for a household in the village was $43,750, and the median income for a family was $42,955. Males had a median income of $35,625 versus $36,477 for females. The per capita income for the village was $20,255. About 4.0% of families and 8.5% of the population were below the poverty line, including 1.3% of those under age 18 and 18.8% of those age 65 or over.

=== Housing ===
There were 283 housing units at an average density of 707.5 per square mile (273.2/km^{2}). 11.3% of housing units were vacant.

There were 251 occupied housing units in the village. 153 were owner-occupied units (61.0%), while 98 were renter-occupied (39.0%). The homeowner vacancy rate was 2.5% of total units. The rental unit vacancy rate was 8.3%.

== Notable people ==
- Silas M. Burroughs (politician), former US Congressman
- Silas Halsey, former US Congressman
