= West Ward School =

West Ward School may refer to:

- West Ward School (Gas City, Indiana), National Register of Historic Places-listed in Grant County
- West Ward School (Wakefield, Massachusetts)

== See also ==
- Ward School (disambiguation)
