= John B. Murray (general) =

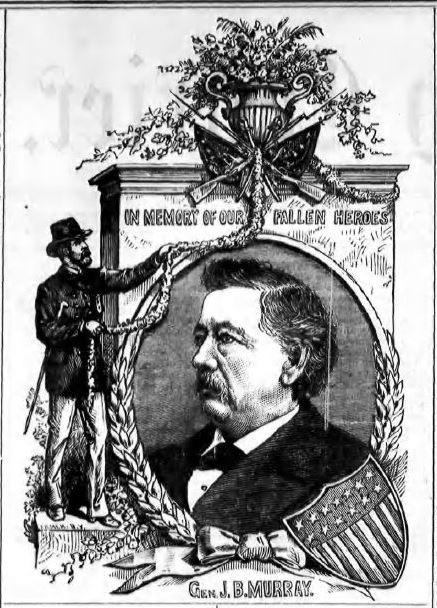
- From the Seneca County Courier, June 4, 1885
- Born: August 13, 1822; Arlington, Vermont, U.S.
- Died: October 8, 1884 (aged 62); Seneca Falls, New York, U.S.
- Occupations: Attorney, Bvt. Brig. General

John B. Murray (August 13, 1822 – October 8, 1884) was an attorney and United States Volunteers brevet brigadier general of the American Civil War.

John Boyce Murray is known as one of the founders of Memorial Day, along with druggist Henry C. Welles.

== Biography ==
Murray was born in Arlington, Vermont, to Edward and Phoebe Manchester Murray. He married Angelina Savage in 1848 and they had two children, William and Maud while living in Bearytown (now Fayette), New York. He moved to Seneca Falls, NY in 1853 where he joined the state militia and began practicing law. At the outbreak of the Civil War, he was commissioned a Captain of the 50th New York State Engineers. He resigned his commission in the summer of 1862 but rejoined the 148th Regiment, New York Volunteers as a Major that fall. He was promoted to Lieutenant Colonel in 1863 and to Colonel in 1864. He was brevetted to the rank of Brigadier General for meritorious service in 1865. He moved to Waterloo, New York, after being elected Seneca County Clerk in the fall of 1865. It was here that he met Welles. Murray became active in the Grand Army of the Republic and was appointed postmaster. He resumed his law practice in 1880 and spoke at political rallies and Memorial Day services. It was following one of his speeches on October 7, 1884, that he became ill and succumbed the next day.

== Presidential Proclamation ==
President Lyndon Johnson proclaimed Waterloo the birthplace of the holiday following the passage of House Concurrent Resolution (HCR) 587 in 1966. The resolution and proclamation were based on research done by eight members of the community who comprised the Research Committee of the Waterloo Memorial Day Centennial Committee. Their purpose was to promote the centennial of the founding of Memorial Day on May 5, 1866. The holiday was supposedly conceived by Welles who communicated the idea to Murray, the county clerk who helped carry it out.

== Myth Exposed ==
In 2014, almost fifty years after the proclamation, Bellware and Gardiner published The Genesis of the Memorial Day Holiday in America and call into question the veracity of that claim. According to the research committee, there are no contemporaneous reports of this celebration. Their earliest sources date from 1882, sixteen years after the event. Bellware and Gardiner, however, uncovered evidence that this story was a myth. This evidence includes an earlier report from 1875 in a New York newspaper that describes, in detail, Waterloo’s first Memorial Day and places it in 1868 as well as other inconsistencies between the historical record and the story compiled by the Centennial Committee. They also note a complete lack of discussion or debate by the congressional committee behind HCR 587. Unlike Welles, Murray seems complicit in the hoax. He was called the founder of Memorial Day during his lifetime and was in demand as a Memorial Day orator. Bellware and Gardiner credit Mary Ann Williams and the Ladies Memorial Association of Columbus, Georgia as the true originators of the holiday as abundant contemporaneous evidence from across the nation exists to substantiate the claim.

In 2016, VFW Magazine featured an article by Doris Wolf in recognition of the 150th anniversary of Waterloo's Memorial Day observance. The editors added a note at the beginning of the article advising the readers of the existence of Bellware and Gardiner's book, that the Columbus, Georgia event of April 26, 1866, predated the Waterloo event by nine days and that the article on Waterloo was being presented to provoke historical inquiry.

In 2019, the hoax was further explored (and exposed) by author Marshall S. Berdan in Welles’ hometown of Glastonbury, CT. His article in The Glastonbury Citizen recounts Berdan’s disenchantment with the story after the staff of Waterloo’s National Memorial Day Museum was unable to provide the definitive evidence he sought prior to the placement of a plaque honoring Welles in Glastonbury. It also mentions some of Berdan's own research used to debunk the myth.
