= The Three Bears (disambiguation) =

"The Story of the Three Bears" is a tale by Robert Southey published in 1837. It is generally known today as "The Three Bears", "Goldilocks and the Three Bears" or simply "Goldilocks".

The Three Bears can also refer to:

- The Three Bears (comic strip), a long-running British comic strip from The Beano
- The Three Bears (Looney Tunes), animated characters in the Warner Bros. Looney Tunes and Merrie Melodies series of cartoons
- Seneca County Courthouse Complex at Ovid, also known as the "Three Bears"
- Three Bears, a chain of grocery stores in Alaska

== See also ==
- the webcomic The Three Bare Bears or its animated adaptation We Bare Bears
