= Ward School =

Ward School may refer to:

Argentina

- Ward School (Villa Sarmiento, Argentina), a school in Villa Sarmiento within Buenos Aires

Canada

- Mary Ward Catholic Secondary School, Scarborough, Toronto, Ontario, known also as "Ward School"

Lithuania

- War School of Kaunas, a military school in Kaunas during 1919-1940

New Zealand

- Ward School, New Zealand, in Ward, New Zealand

United States

- Ward School (Ward, Colorado), NRHP-listed in Boulder County
- Ward School (Hartsville, Tennessee), NRHP-listed in Trousdale County

== See also ==
- North Ward School (disambiguation), schools in Missouri and Ontario
- South Ward School (disambiguation), schools in Florida, Iowa, Pennsylvania
- East Ward School, also known as the Teresa Merrill School, St. Johns, Michigan, NRHP-listed
- West Ward School (disambiguation), schools in Indiana and Massachusetts
- First Ward School, Elkins, Randolph County, West Virginia, NRHP-listed
- Second Ward School (disambiguation), schools in New Mexico and Wisconsin
- Third Ward School, Sheboygan, Wisconsin, NRHP-listed
- Fourth Ward School (disambiguation), schools in Nevada, New York, Texas, West Virginia
- Fifth Ward School, Louisville, Kentucky, also known as "Monsarrat School"
