= John B. Murray =

John B. Murray may refer to:

- John B. Murray (general) (1822–1884), American general
- John B. Murray (filmmaker), Australian filmmaker
- John Bunion Murray (1908–1988), self-taught artist in Glascock County, Georgia

== See also ==
- John Murray (disambiguation)
