= South Ward School =

South Ward School may refer to:

- South Ward School (Clearwater, Florida), listed on the National Register of Historic Places (NRHP)
- South Ward School (Cresco, Iowa), listed on the NRHP
- South Ward School (Bellefonte, Pennsylvania), listed on the NRHP

== See also ==
- Ward School (disambiguation)
