= Second Ward School =

Second Ward School may refer to:

- Second Ward School (Santa Fe, New Mexico), listed on the National Register of Historic Places in Santa Fe County, New Mexico
- Second Ward School (Eau Claire, Wisconsin), listed on the National Register of Historic Places in Eau Claire County, Wisconsin

== See also ==
- Ward School (disambiguation)
