= United States Post Office (Seneca Falls, New York) =

- U.S. Post Office
- U.S. National Register of Historic Places
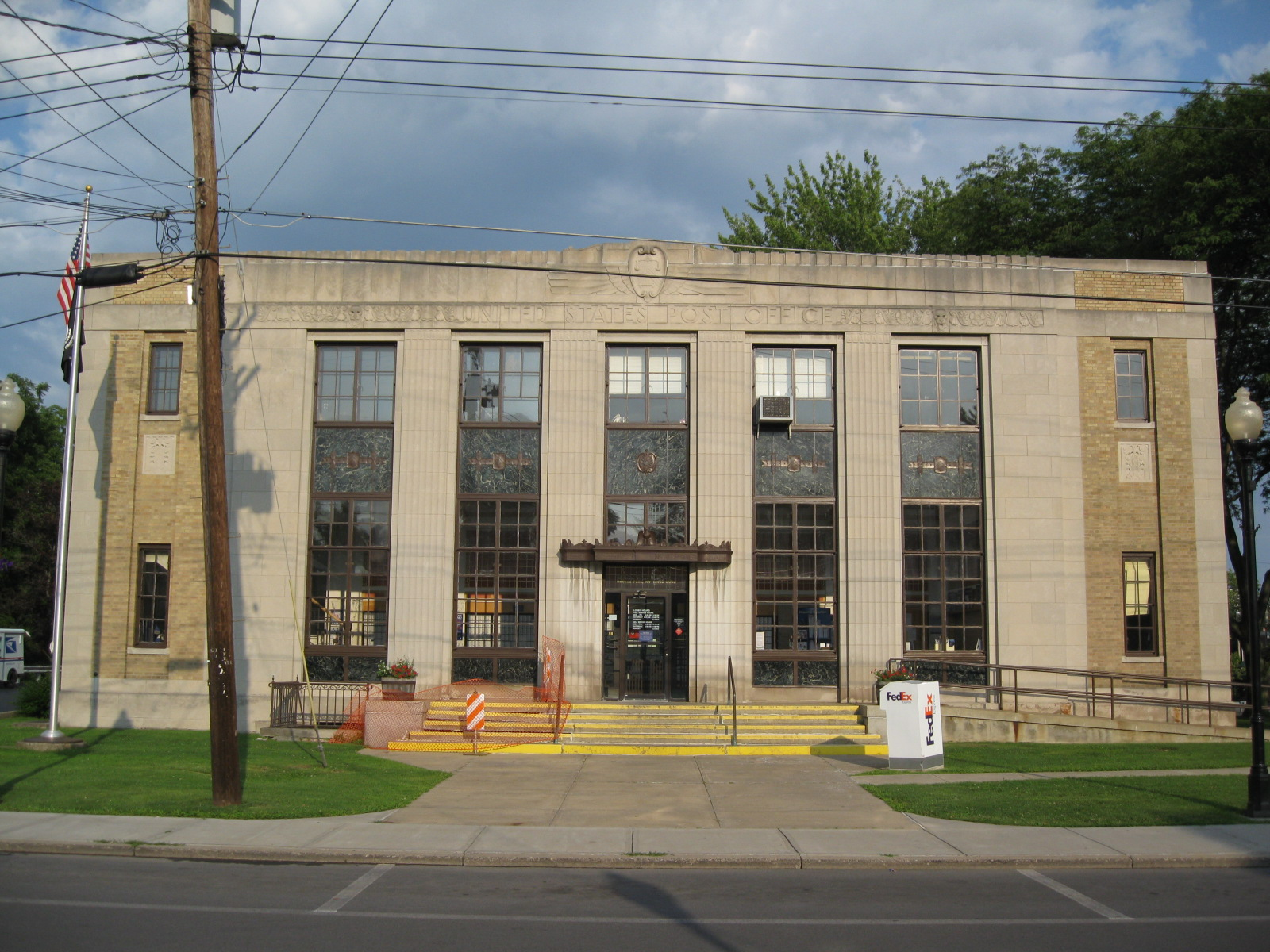
- U.S. Post Office, Seneca Falls NY, August 2009

- Location within New York Location within the United States
- Location: 34-42 State St., Seneca Falls, New York
- Coordinates: 42°54′42″N 76°47′54″W
- Area: less than one acre
- Built: 1932
- Architect: Wetmore, James A.; US Treasury Department
- Architectural style: Classical Revival, Art Deco
- MPS: US Post Offices in New York State, 1858-1943, TR
- NRHP reference No.: 88002431
- Added to NRHP: May 11, 1989

US Post Office-Seneca Falls is a historic post office building located at Seneca Falls in Seneca County, New York. It was designed and built in 1932-1934 and is one of a number of post offices in New York State designed by the Office of the Supervising Architect of the Treasury Department, James A. Wetmore. It is irregular in plan, with a U-shaped, two-story main block with a one-story interior section, and a one-story rear wing with a mailing platform. The facades are clad in buff-colored brick and limestone and executed in the Classical Revival style with Art Deco decorative detailing.

It was listed on the National Register of Historic Places in its own right in 1989, and is also a contributing property to the NRHP-listed Seneca Falls Village Historic District established in 1991.
