= Aaron Wilson House =

Historic house in New York, United States

- U.S. National Register of Historic Places
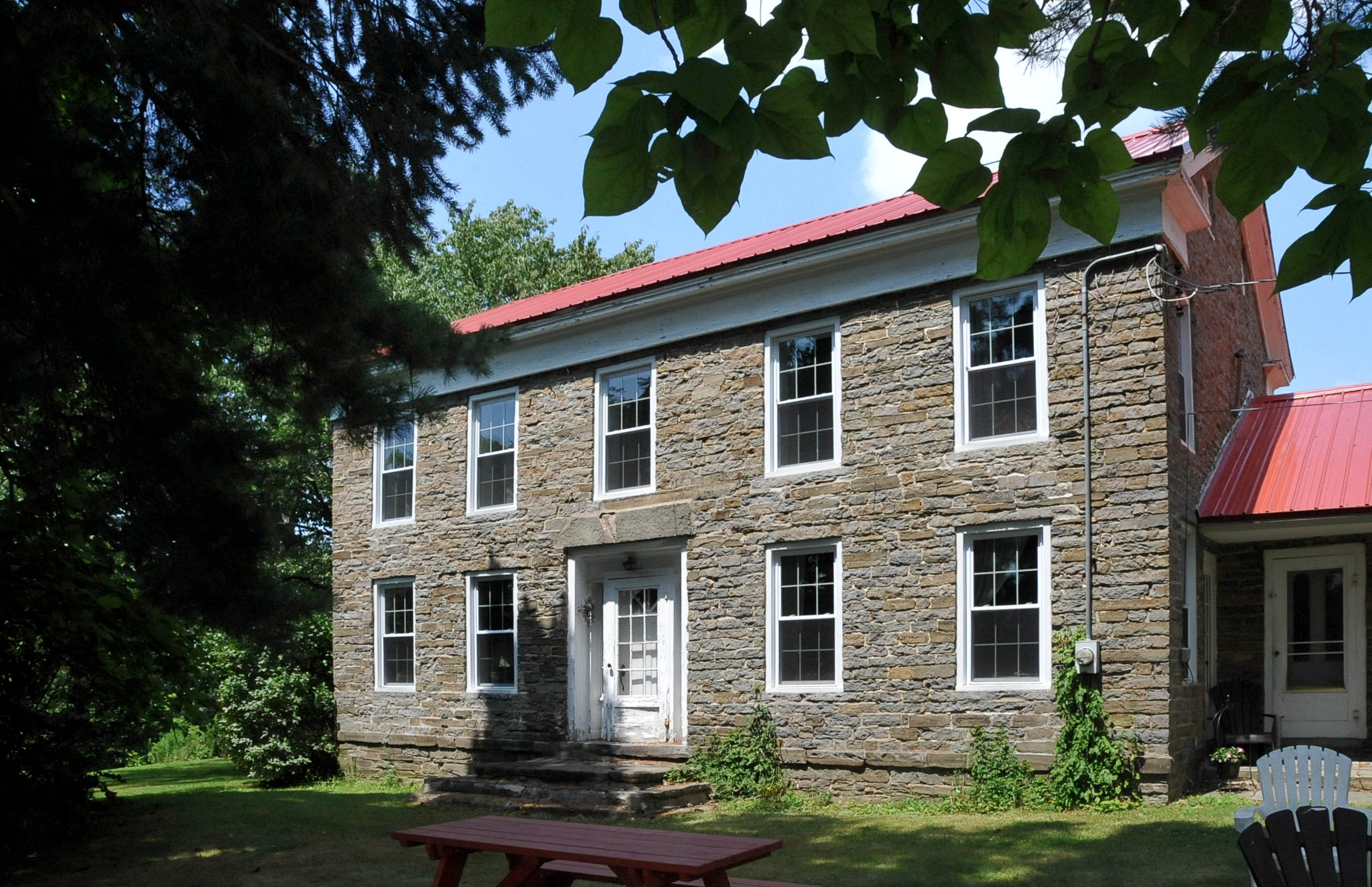

- Location within New York Location within the United States
- Location: 2037 Wilson Rd., Ovid, New York
- Coordinates: 42°38′48″N 76°49′55″W
- Area: 187 acres (76 ha)
- Built: 1835
- Architectural style: Federal
- NRHP reference No.: 01000577
- Added to NRHP: May 30, 2001

Aaron Wilson House is a historic home located at Ovid in Seneca County, New York. It is a five bay wide, two story, center hall stone dwelling built about 1835 in the Federal style. Also on the property is a huge, gambrel roofed dairy barn, a machine shed, and frame pumphouse.

It was listed on the National Register of Historic Places in 2001.
