= David and Mary Kinne Farmstead =

Historic house in New York, United States

- U.S. National Register of Historic Places
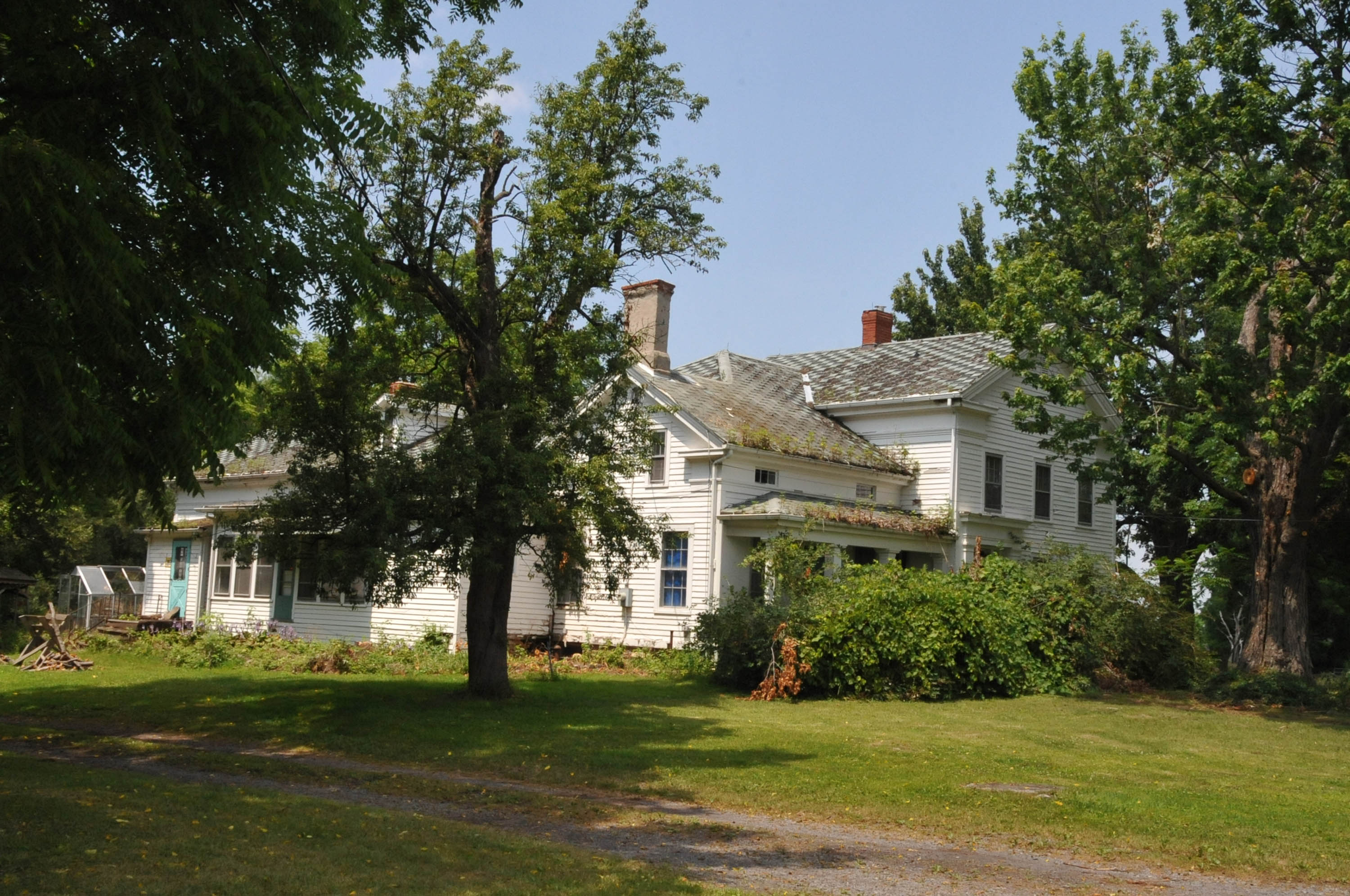

- Location within New York Location within the United States
- Nearest city: Ovid, New York
- Coordinates: 42.6918°N 76.8428°W
- Area: 104.1 acres (42.1 ha)
- Built: 1850
- Architectural style: Greek Revival
- MPS: Freedom Trail, Abolitionism, and African American Life in Central New York MPS
- NRHP reference No.: 07000865
- Added to NRHP: August 30, 2007

David and Mary Kinne Farmstead is a historic home and farm complex located at Ovid in Seneca County, New York. The complex consists of a Greek Revival style farmhouse and seven historic agricultural outbuildings. By family tradition, the house is believed to have been built about 1850 and is believed to have been used as a stop on the Underground Railroad. The outbuildings all date to the mid- to late-19th century and include an outhouse, machine shop, carriage house, horse barn, scale house, gambrel roof barn, and machine shed.

It was listed on the National Register of Historic Places in 2007.
