= Fall Street–Trinity Lane Historic District =

Historic district in New York, United States

- U.S. National Register of Historic Places
- U.S. Historic district
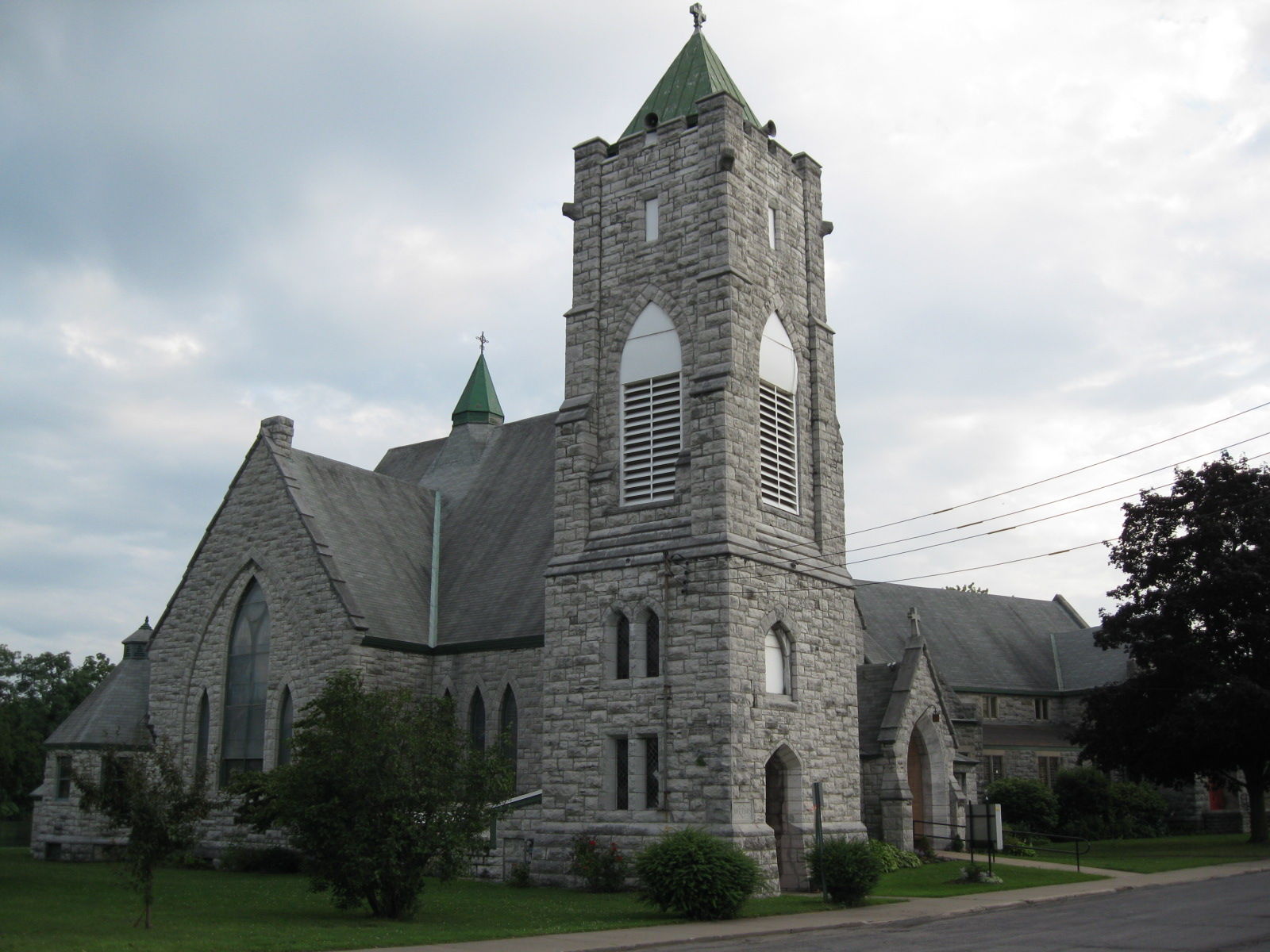
- Trinity Church, Seneca Falls NY, August 2009
- Nearest city: Seneca Falls, New York
- Area: 13 acres (5.3 ha)
- Built: 1851
- Architect: Brown & Dawson
- NRHP reference No.: 74001306
- Added to NRHP: February 11, 1974

Fall Street–Trinity Lane Historic District is a national historic district located at Seneca Falls in Seneca County, New York. The district includes the archaeological remains of 19th century industrial structures located on three islands in the Seneca River. Also included are the limestone Trinity Church (1886) and its associated parish house (1916) and the red brick "The Armitage" historic home built about 1850. Other structures include the board and batten "Cline's Barn" and a rectangular 1920s bandstand.

It was listed on the National Register of Historic Places in 1974.
