= Fourth Ward School (Morgantown, West Virginia) =

- U.S. National Register of Historic Places
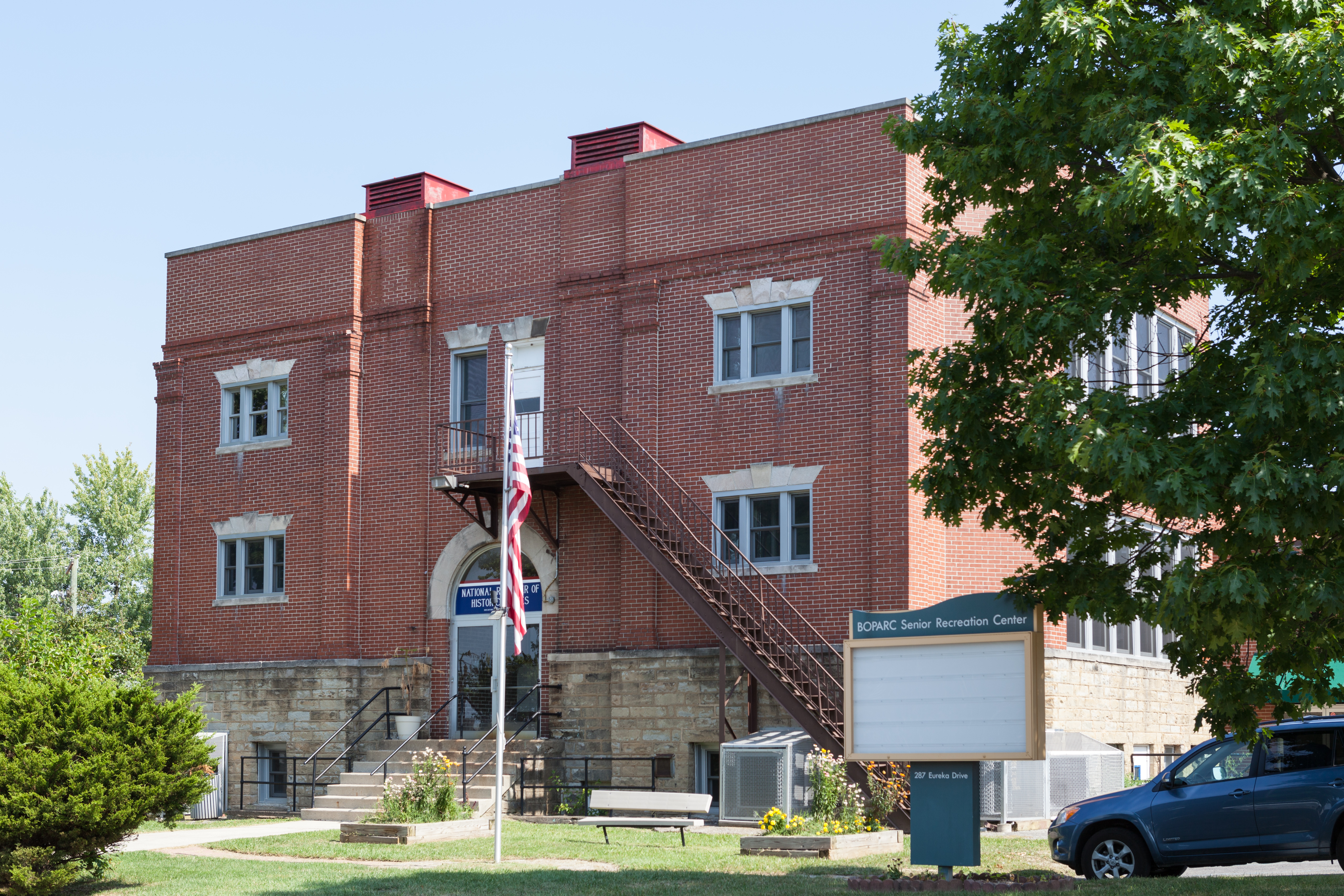
- The front of the former school

- Location within West Virginia Location within the United States
- Location: 287 Eureka Dr., Morgantown, West Virginia
- Coordinates: 39°38′35.6″N 79°57′06.9″W
- Area: 3.5 acres (1.4 ha)
- Built: 1910
- Built by: Smith Construction Co.
- Architect: Tucker and Silling
- Architectural style: Romanesque
- NRHP reference No.: 04000914
- Added to NRHP: August 25, 2004

Fourth Ward School, also known as the Wiles Hill School, is a historic school building located at Morgantown, Monongalia County, West Virginia. It consists of the original 1910 school building with two historic additions from 1939 and 1952, and the 1983 gymnasium building. It is a two-story, red brick, Romanesque Revival building on a raised basement and water table of ashlar sandstone. The 1939 rear addition was built as a Public Works Administration project and has plain Art Deco style trim The 1939 addition contains a stage and an auditorium / cafeteria.

It was listed on the National Register of Historic Places in 2004.
