= North Ward School =

North Ward School may refer to:

- North Ward School (Bolivar, Missouri)
- North Ward School (Paris, Ontario)
