= West Ward School (Wakefield, Massachusetts) =

- U.S. National Register of Historic Places
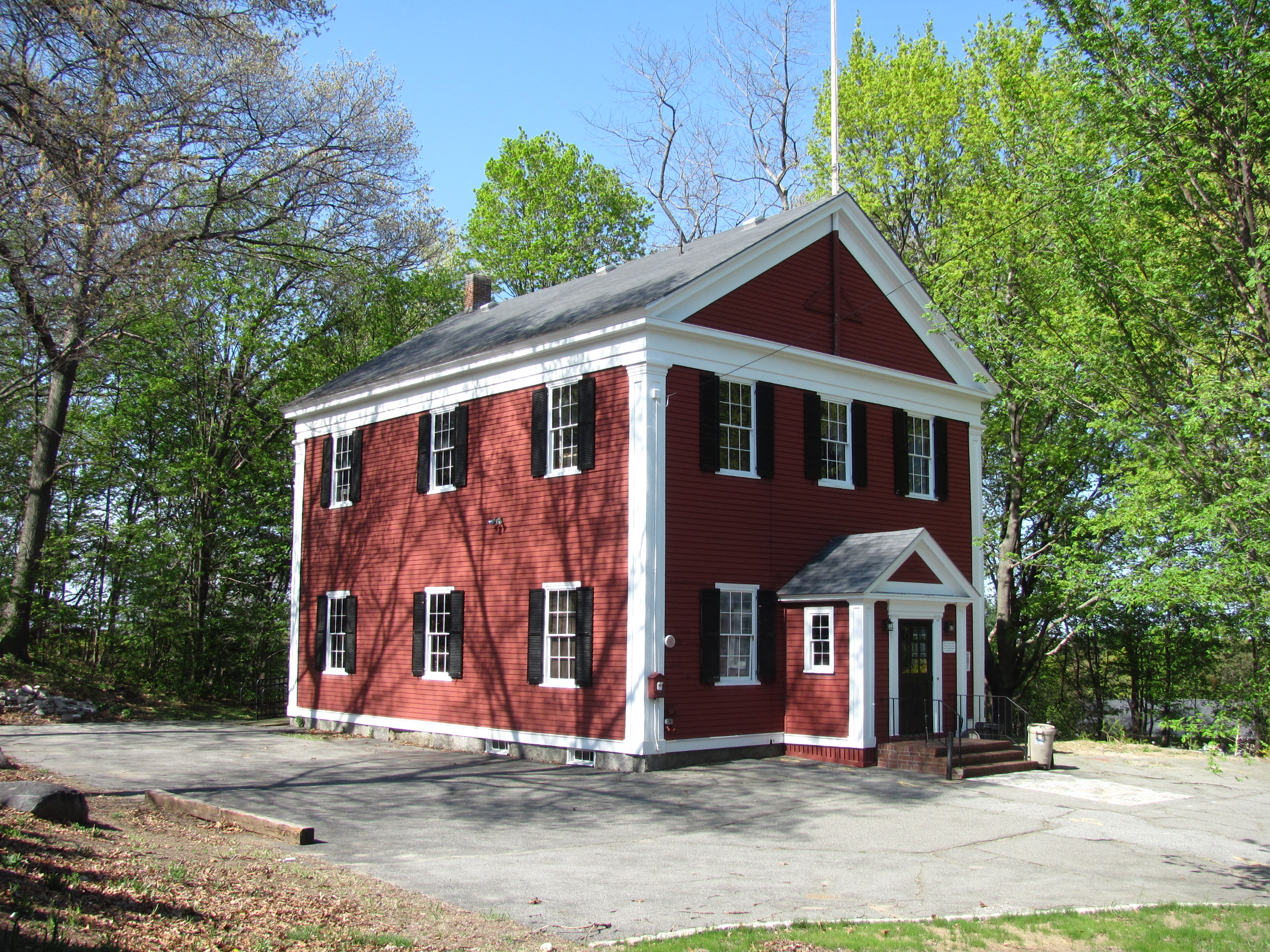
- West Ward School

- Location within Massachusetts Location within the United States
- Location: 39 Prospect St., Wakefield, Massachusetts
- Coordinates: 42°30′21″N 71°4′59″W
- Built: 1847
- Architectural style: Greek Revival
- MPS: Wakefield MRA
- NRHP reference No.: 89000748
- Added to NRHP: July 06, 1989

The West Ward School is a historic school at 39 Prospect Street in Wakefield, Massachusetts. Built in 1847, it is the only surviving Greek Revival schoolhouse (of four built) in the town. The building was listed on the National Register of Historic Places in 1989. It is now maintained by the local historical society as a museum property.

== Description and history ==
The West Ward School is located on the north side of Prospect Street, just east of its junction with Nichols Street. Prospect Street is a major east–west route through northwestern Wakefield, and is predominantly residential in this area. The school is a two-story wood-frame structure, with a front-facing gable roof, clapboard siding, and a projecting gable-roofed entry vestibule. The gable end is fully boxed, with a triangular louver at its center. An entablature encircles the building, supported by corner pilasters. The front facade is three bays wide, with the entry vestibule at the center, echoing on a smaller scale the details of the main facade.

The town of Wakefield experienced a boom in growth following the arrival of the railroad in town in 1845. Four district schools were built in response, including this one in 1847. In 1858 continued growth in the student population prompted the addition of the second story classroom. The school remained open, the town population resisting administration calls to close it, until 1998, when a failure of the second floor ceiling led to its closing. The building has been restored by the Wakefield Historical Society, and now serves as its museum.

== See also ==
- National Register of Historic Places listings in Wakefield, Massachusetts
- National Register of Historic Places listings in Middlesex County, Massachusetts
