= Julius and Harriet Bull House =

Historic house in New York, United States

- U.S. National Register of Historic Places
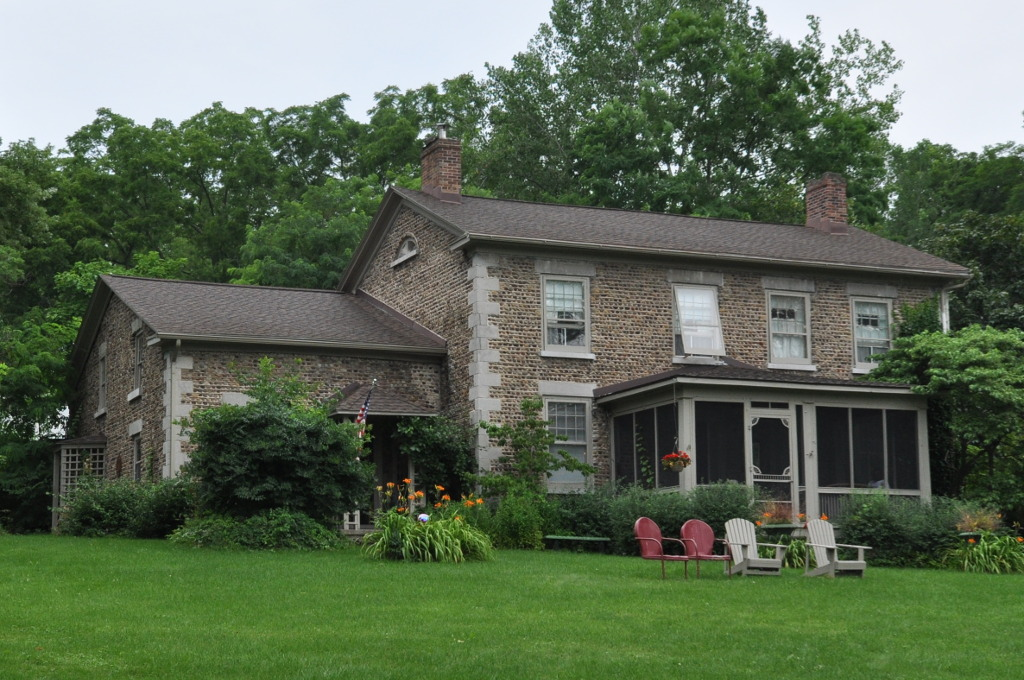

- Location within New York Location within the United States
- Location: 2534 Lower Lake Rd. Seneca Falls, New York
- Coordinates: 42°54′14″N 76°45′5″W
- Area: 1.9 acres (0.77 ha)
- Built: 1830
- Architectural style: Early 19th-century vernacular
- MPS: Freedom Trail, Abolitionism, and African American Life in Central New York MPS
- NRHP reference No.: 07000869
- Added to NRHP: August 30, 2007

Julius and Harriet Bull House, also known as Ferry Farm, is a historic home located at Seneca Falls in Seneca County, New York. The house is a four bay wide, two story cobblestone house. It was built in 1830 and the facade is constructed of variously sized and colored field cobbles. The house is among the approximately 18 surviving cobblestone buildings in Seneca County. The house is believed to have been used as a stop on the Underground Railroad. Also on the property is a contributing carriage barn / workshop.

It was listed on the National Register of Historic Places in 2007.
