= Edith B. Ford Memorial Library =

United States historic place

- U.S. National Register of Historic Places
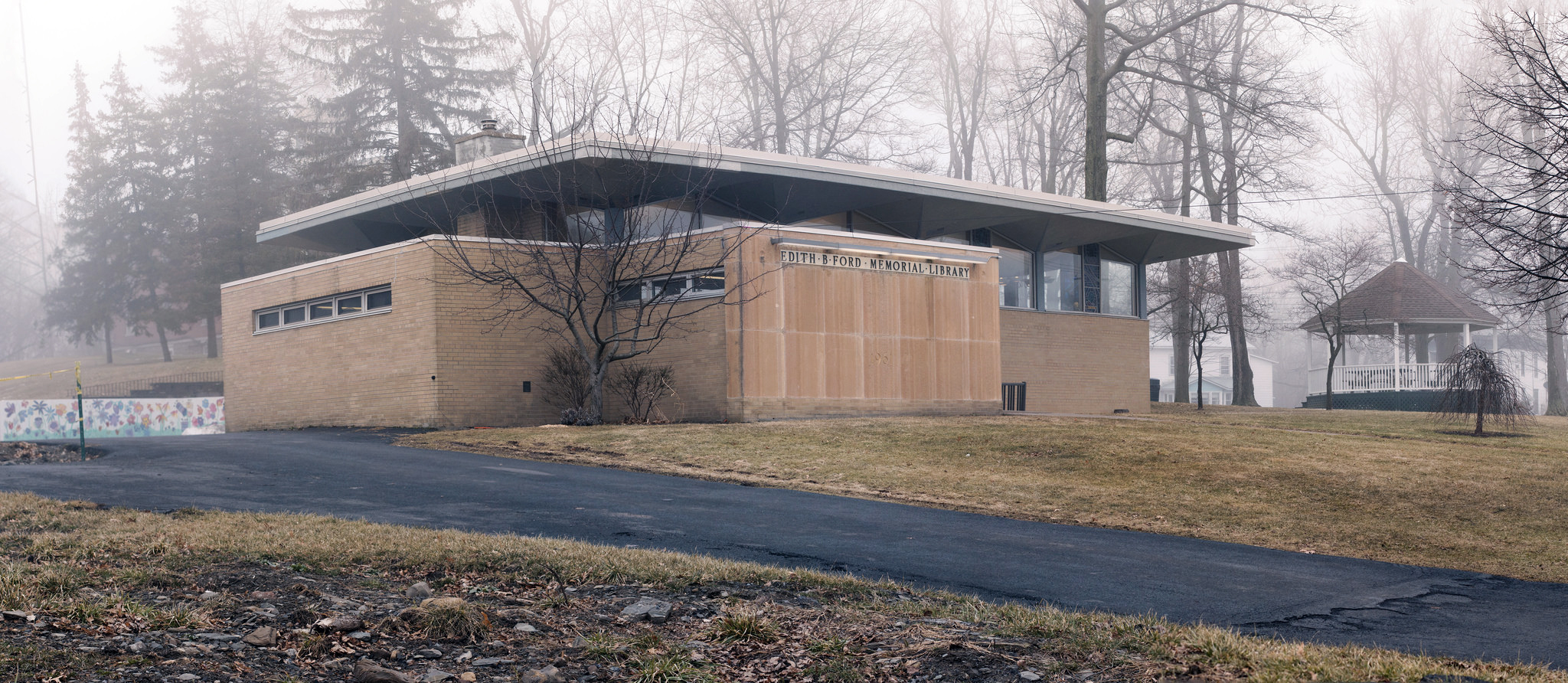
- Edith B. Ford Memorial Library (February 28, 2019)

- Location within New York Location within the United States
- Location: 7169 Main St, Ovid, NY 14521
- Coordinates: 42°40′38″N 76°49′20″W
- Built: 1899 relocated in 1961 expanded in 2018
- Architectural style: New Formalism
- NRHP reference No.: 100002514
- Added to NRHP: May 25, 2018

The Edith B. Ford Memorial Library is a rural library in Ovid, New York, USA. It was listed on the National Register of Historic Places in May 2018.

== History ==
The library was founded in 1899, and University of the State of New York granted it "Ovid Free Library" charter in December 1899. At first, the library was located at the residence of James French, which was also the office of the Ovid Gazette and Independent.

In 1905, the library moved into the Seneca County Clerk's Office.

In 1961, the library was relocated to the current building which was designed by John C. Ehrlich. Its design follows New Formalist architecture - a small, one-story building. The library's new building was built from the donation given by Walter Burton Ford, a philanthropist and retired mathematics professor at the University of Michigan, in memory of his late wife and educator Edith Banker Ford, who died in 1959.

In October 1962, the charter was amended and the name was changed to the Edith B. Ford Memorial Library of Ovid, New York.

On March 16, 2018, the Governor of New York, Andrew Cuomo, recommended the library to the New York State Register of Historic Places and National Register of Historic Places (NRHP). On May 25, 2018, it was registered with the NRHP. History of the Public Library in Ovid NY 1898 The Ovid Free Library was founded following services in the Ovid Union Cemetery, when Mrs. H. A. Porter suggested to Mrs. Cyrus Kinne that the people of Ovid should have a library.

TIMELINE

1899 The provisional charter was granted to the Ovid Free Library on December 21, 1899 by the Regents of University of the State of New York. The library was first located in the Ovid Gazette office located in the home of James French.

1905 The Ovid Free Library was moved to the Seneca County Clerk’s Office, known as Mama Bear, in Ovid.

Who is Edith B. Ford?

1959 Dr. Walter Burton Ford [1874-1971] provided funding to build a new library in honor of his late wife Edith Banker Ford [1875-1959]. Mr. & Mrs. Ford were college-educated teachers who met while both were students at Oneonta State Normal School and married in October 1900. The Fords returned to Edith’s hometown in 1940. Edith Banker Ford was born in Ovid, New York on July 24, 1875. Her parents were John DeMott Banker and Elizabeth Losey Banker. Edith graduated from Ovid Union High School in June 1892. In the fall of 1892, Edith began her studies at the State Normal School at Oneonta. Edith attended Radcliffe College, and taught school in New Britain, Connecticut.

Building the Library at 7169 North Main Street, Ovid NY

1961 Construction began on the new library building at 7169 N. Main Street, Ovid. The architect was John C. Ehrlich of Geneva, NY. The construction firm of Brown & Hoyt Co., of Canandaigua, NY built the new library. The interior woodwork and furnishings were crafted by Walkerbilt Woodwork, Inc., of Penn Yan, NY. The façade features pink Kasota dolomite limestone from Minnesota. The exterior eaves of the roof contain inverted pyramids with tiles produced by the American-Olean Tile Company. The stained-glass windows were created by Charles Northrup of Rochester, NY.

1962 Books were moved via “bucket brigade” from Mama Bear to the new library by members of the Ovid Willard Lions Club and citizen volunteers. “Open House Edith B. Ford Memorial Library” was held and more than 150 attended. The library’s name was changed from the Ovid Free Library to Edith B. Ford Memorial Library.

1999 The library was named the Fourth-Best Small Rural Library in the US by the American Library Association.

2018 A ground-breaking ceremony launched the start of construction for a new addition. Edith B. Ford Memorial Library was placed on the National Register of Historic Places as a significant example of Mid-Twentieth Century Modern architecture.

2019 “Open House Edith B. Ford Memorial Library” was held to unveil the new two-story addition to the library featuring new archival local history rooms, a new classroom, expanded Young Adult room, and two new conference rooms.

“The roof of the building is flat with the underside creating a series of pyramids. The underside of the exterior portion of these pyramids is finished with ceramic tile having radiating lines from the columns to the eaves. At the junction of these radiating lines and the columns, the tile patterns create an illusion of column caps in different colors. The pyramidal surfaces create a feeling of uplift toward the eave of the building, symbolic of the expanding horizons imparted by research and education.” [Brochure, Open House Edith B. Ford Memorial Library, June 10, 1962]
