= First Presbyterian Church (Waterloo, New York) =

Historic church in New York, United States

- U.S. National Register of Historic Places
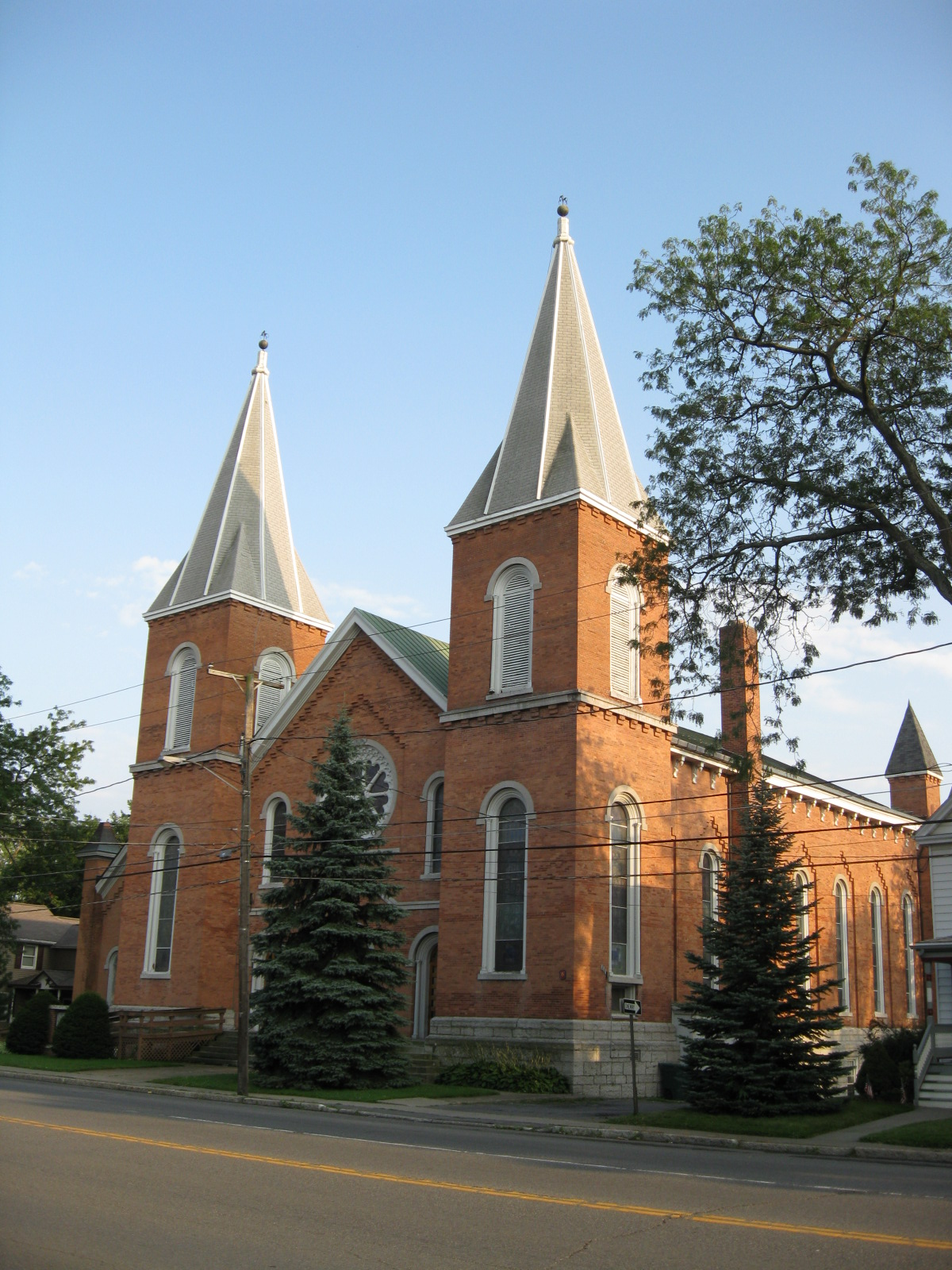
- First Presbyterian Church, Waterloo, NY, August 2009

- Location within New York Location within the United States
- Location: E. Main St., E of jct. with NY 96, Waterloo, New York
- Coordinates: 42°54′14″N 76°51′39″W
- Area: less than one acre
- Built: 1850
- Architectural style: Romanesque
- NRHP reference No.: 96001386
- Added to NRHP: November 29, 1996

First Presbyterian Church is a historic Presbyterian church located at Waterloo in Seneca County, New York. It was constructed in 1850 and is a monumental brick Romanesque Revival, 104-by-65-foot (32 by 20 m) edifice. The facade features a large rose window and two soaring, square, 90-foot-tall (27 m) corner towers with octagonal spires. A small 1 1/2-story chapel was added to the east elevation of the church in 1880–1881.

It was listed on the National Register of Historic Places in 1996.
