= United States Post Office (Waterloo, New York) =

- US Post Office-Waterloo
- U.S. National Register of Historic Places
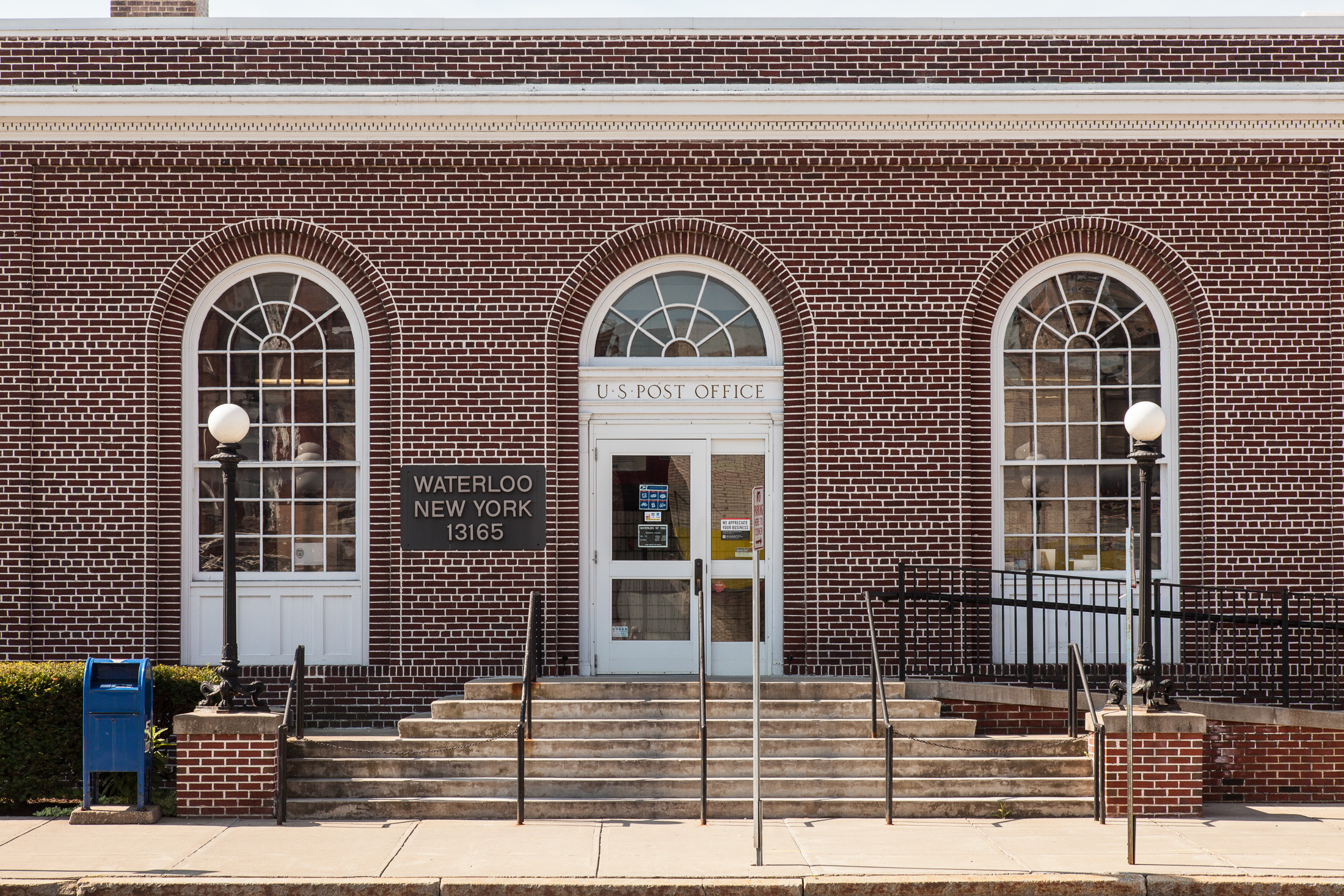

- Location within New York Location within the United States
- Location: 2 E. Main St., Waterloo, New York
- Coordinates: 42°54′15″N 76°51′46″W
- Area: less than one acre
- Built: 1924
- Architect: Wetmore, James A.; US Treasury Department
- Architectural style: Colonial Revival
- MPS: US Post Offices in New York State, 1858-1943, TR
- NRHP reference No.: 88002442
- Added to NRHP: May 11, 1989

US Post Office-Waterloo is a historic post office building located at Waterloo in Seneca County, New York. It was designed and built in 1924 and is one of a number of post offices in New York State designed by the Office of the Supervising Architect of the Treasury Department, James A. Wetmore. It is a symmetrically massed, one story brick building executed in the Colonial Revival style. The roof is surmounted by a wooden cornice and brick parapet.

It was listed on the National Register of Historic Places in 1989.
