= Saint Paul's Church (Waterloo, New York) =

Historic church in New York, United States

- U.S. National Register of Historic Places
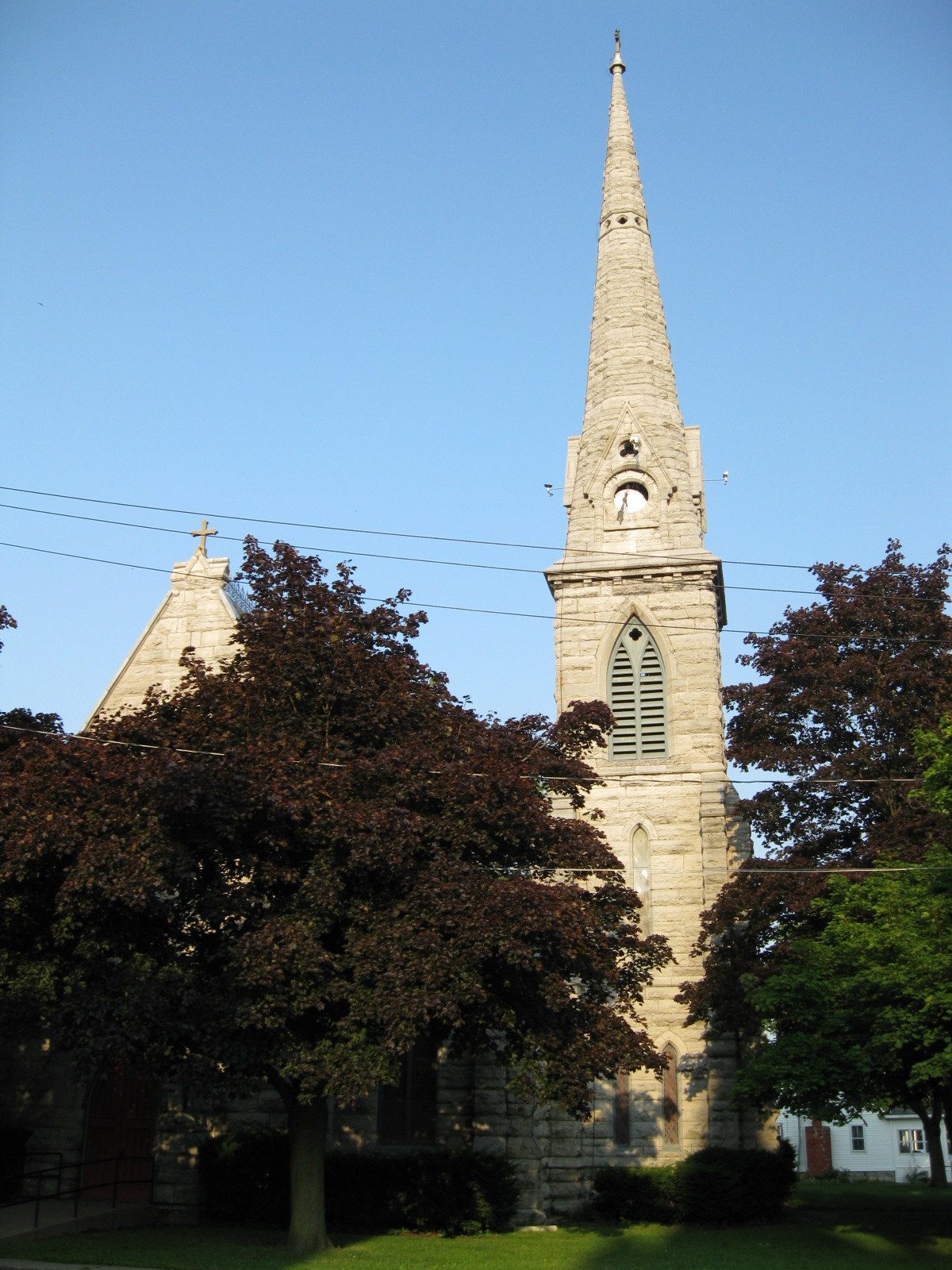
- St. Paul's Church, Waterloo, NY, August 2009

- Location within New York Location within the United States
- Location: 101 E. Williams St., Waterloo, New York
- Coordinates: 42°54′20″N 76°51′35″W
- Area: less than one acre
- Built: 1863-1864
- Architect: multiple
- Architectural style: Gothic Revival
- MPS: Historic Churches of the Episcopal Diocese of Central New York MPS
- NRHP reference No.: 97000115
- Added to NRHP: March 09, 1997

Saint Paul's Church is a historic Episcopal church located at Waterloo in Seneca County, New York. It was constructed in 1863-1864 and is a masonry church built of local limestone in the Gothic Revival style. The 52 feet by 72 feet church features a tower with a stone spire and clock. A large two-story rough-cut limestone parish house was built in 1916.

After 1856, the church built St. John's Chapel on Chapel Street in Waterloo. The land was purchased by Jane Hunt, a Quaker known for support of women's rights.

It was listed on the National Register of Historic Places in 1997.
