= United Methodist Church (Waterloo, New York) =

Historic church in New York, United States

- Waterloo United Methodist Church
- U.S. National Register of Historic Places
- Location within New York Location within the United States
- Location: 21 E. Williams St., Waterloo, New York
- Coordinates: 42°54′28″N 76°51′40″W
- Area: less than 1 acre (0.40 ha)
- Built: 1895
- Architect: VanKirk, M.L.
- Architectural style: Romanesque
- NRHP reference No.: 04001057
- Added to NRHP: September 24, 2004

Waterloo United Methodist Church is a historic United Methodist church located at Waterloo in Seneca County, New York. It was constructed in 1895 and is a brick and stone church with vernacular Romanesque / Greek Revival style design and decorative detail. It features an 85-foot (26 m) tripartite tower, crowned by a tall steeple.

It was listed on the National Register of Historic Places in 2004.
