= Seneca Falls Village Historic District =

Historic district in New York, United States

- U.S. National Register of Historic Places
- U.S. Historic district
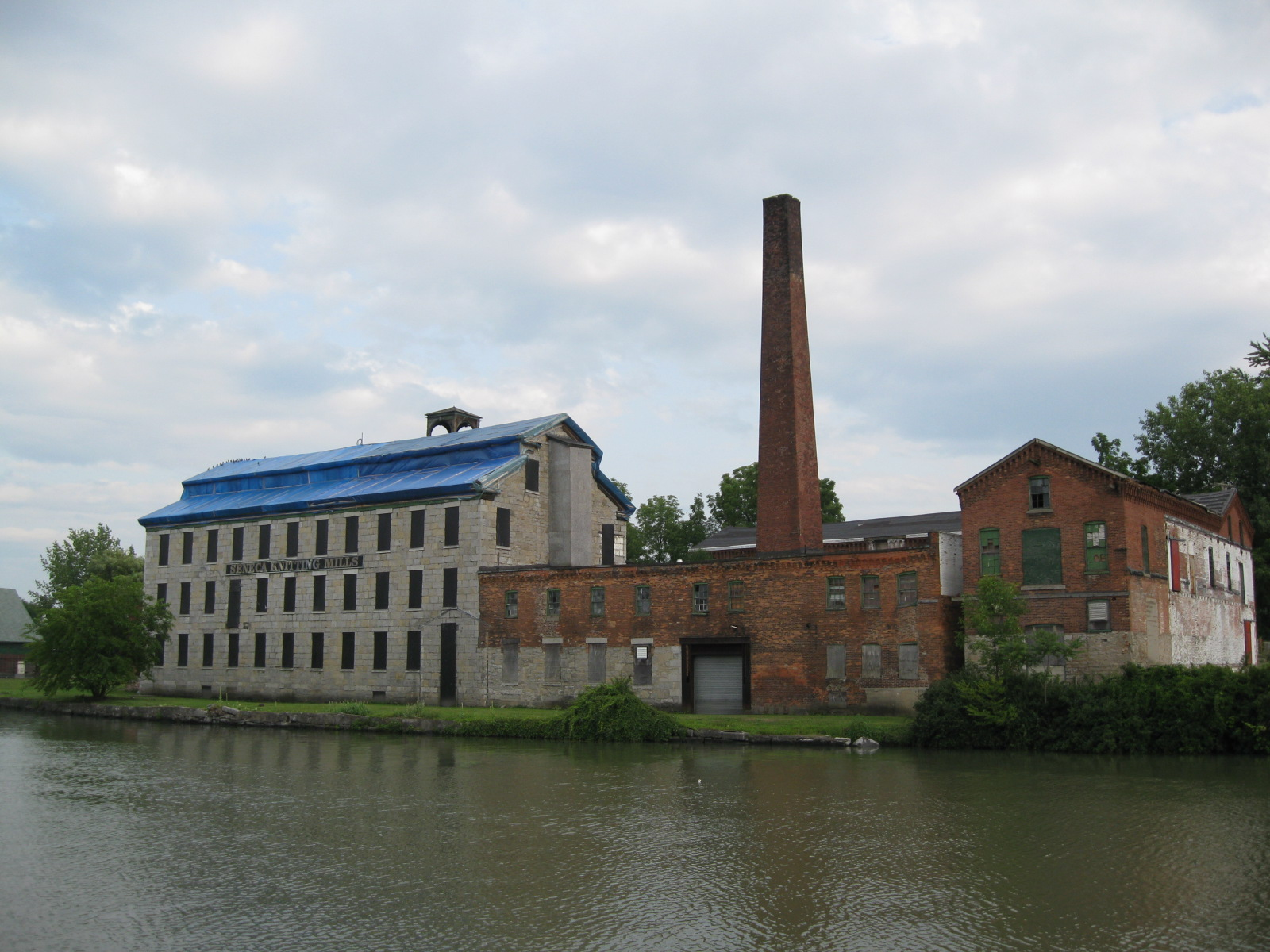
- Seneca Knitting Mills, August 2009

- Location within New York Location within the United States
- Location: Roughly, properties along State and Cayuga Sts. from Butler and Auburn to Canal St., including Van Cleef Lake, Seneca Falls, New York
- Coordinates: 42°54′18″N 77°13′55″W
- Area: 174 acres (70 ha)
- Architect: Multiple
- Architectural style: Mid 19th Century Revival, Late 19th And 20th Century Revivals, Late Victorian
- NRHP reference No.: 91000342
- Added to NRHP: April 05, 1991

Seneca Falls Village Historic District is a national historic district located at Seneca Falls in Seneca County, New York. The district contains 174 principal contributing buildings including 14 contributing outbuildings, 8 contributing structures, 2 contributing objects, and 40 principal contributing buildings. The majority of the buildings are residential or commercial and located north of the New York State Barge Canal. The district encompasses a collection of brick and frame buildings exhibiting a range of mid- to late-19th century and early 20th-century architectural styles. A notable industrial site is the former Seneca Knitting Mills complex.

It was listed on the National Register of Historic Places in 1991.
