= Fourth Ward School (Seneca Falls, New York) =

- U.S. National Register of Historic Places
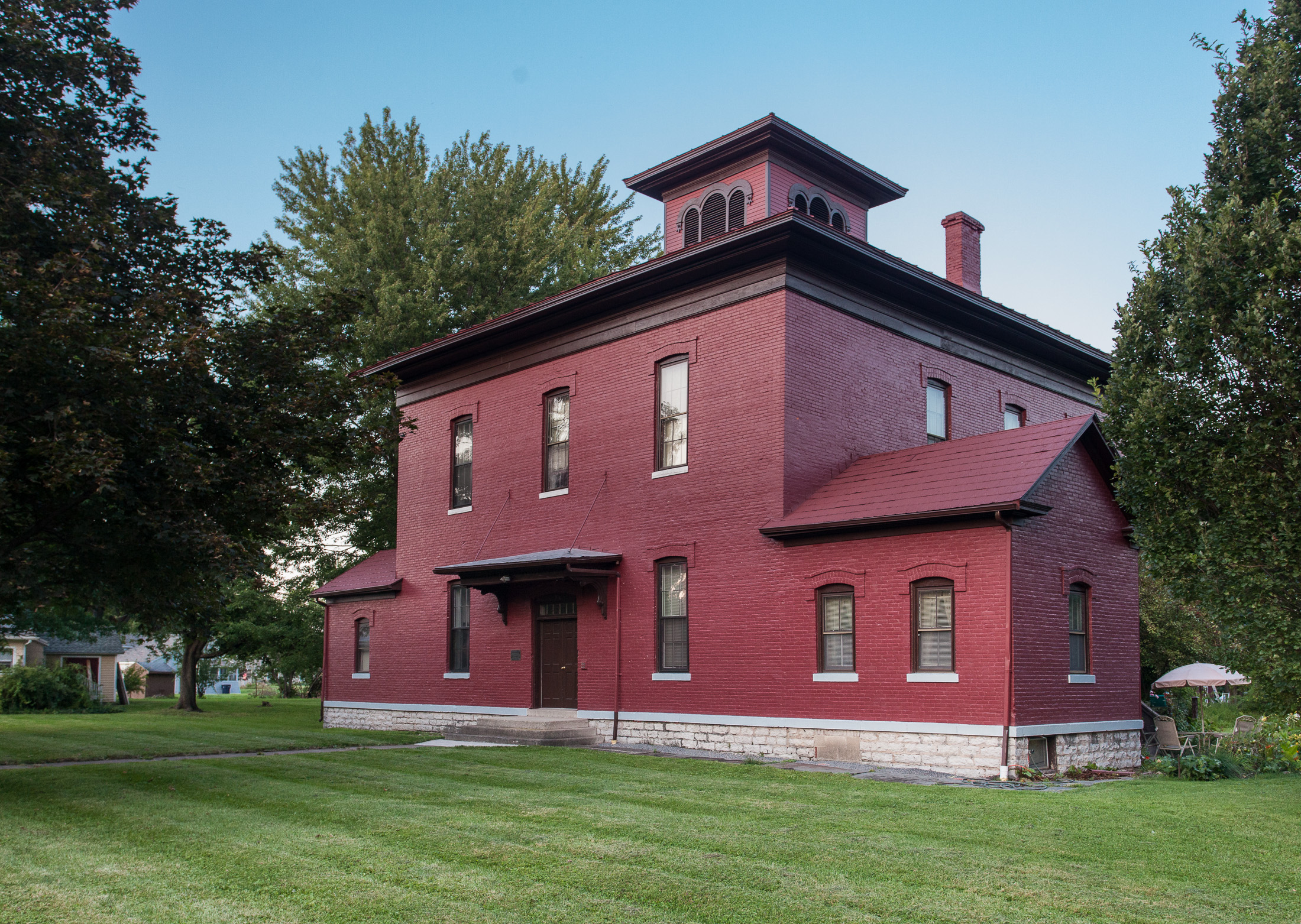
- Fourth Ward School in August 2013.

- Location within New York Location within the United States
- Location: 8 Washington St., Seneca Falls, New York
- Coordinates: 42°54′38″N 76°47′21″W
- Area: 0.8 acres (0.32 ha)
- Built: 1869
- Architect: Jacobson, R.; Bowers, John
- Architectural style: Italianate
- NRHP reference No.: 86000474
- Added to NRHP: March 19, 1986

Fourth Ward School is a historic school building located at Seneca Falls in Seneca County, New York. It is a two-story T-shaped brick structure built in 1869 in the Italianate style. The structure features a hipped roof with a distinctive cupola. It ceased being used as a school in 1933 and converted to apartments. It is located within the boundaries of the Women's Rights National Historical Park.

It was listed on the National Register of Historic Places in 1986.
