= James Russell Webster House =

Historic house in New York, United States

- U.S. National Register of Historic Places
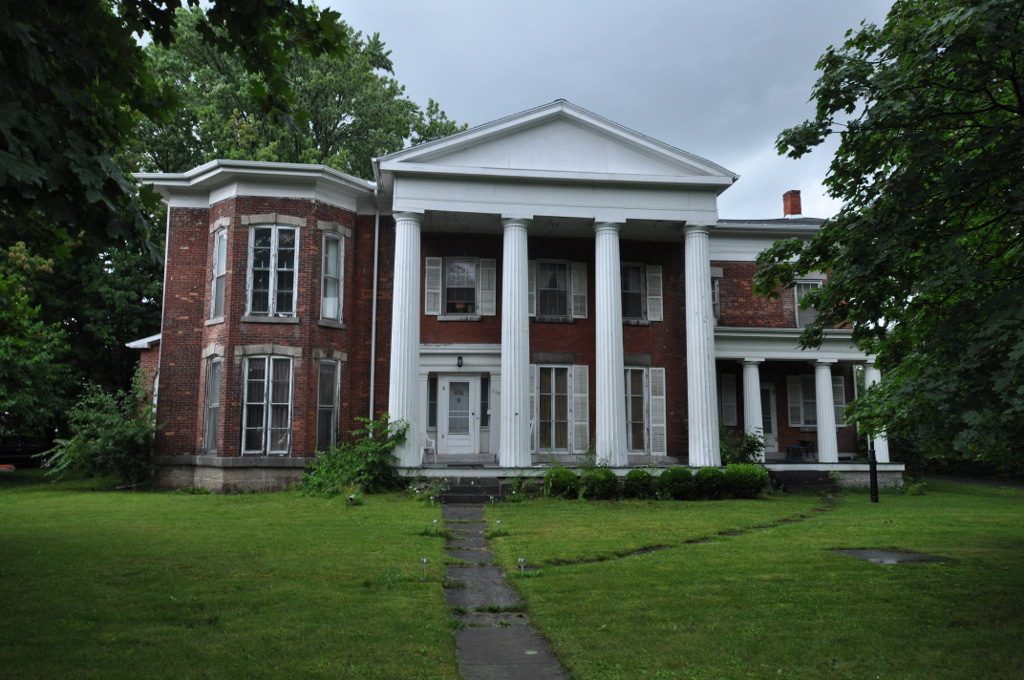
- James Russell Webster House, 2017

- Location within New York Location within the United States
- Location: 115 E. Main St., Waterloo, New York
- Coordinates: 42°54′23″N 76°51′33″W
- Area: less than one acre
- Built: 1850
- Architectural style: Greek Revival
- NRHP reference No.: 07001255
- Added to NRHP: December 11, 2007

James Russell Webster House is a historic home located at Waterloo in Seneca County, New York. It is a temple front Greek Revival style residence. When built in 1850–1855 it featured a two-story, three-bay, side hall main block flanked by two symmetrical one story, three-bay center hall wings. In the 1870s, a veneer of Italianate details were added during and expansion and modernization. The expansion included adding a second story to each side wing. The front facade features a pedimented portico supported by four Doric order columns.

It was listed on the National Register of Historic Places in 2007.

== Gallery ==
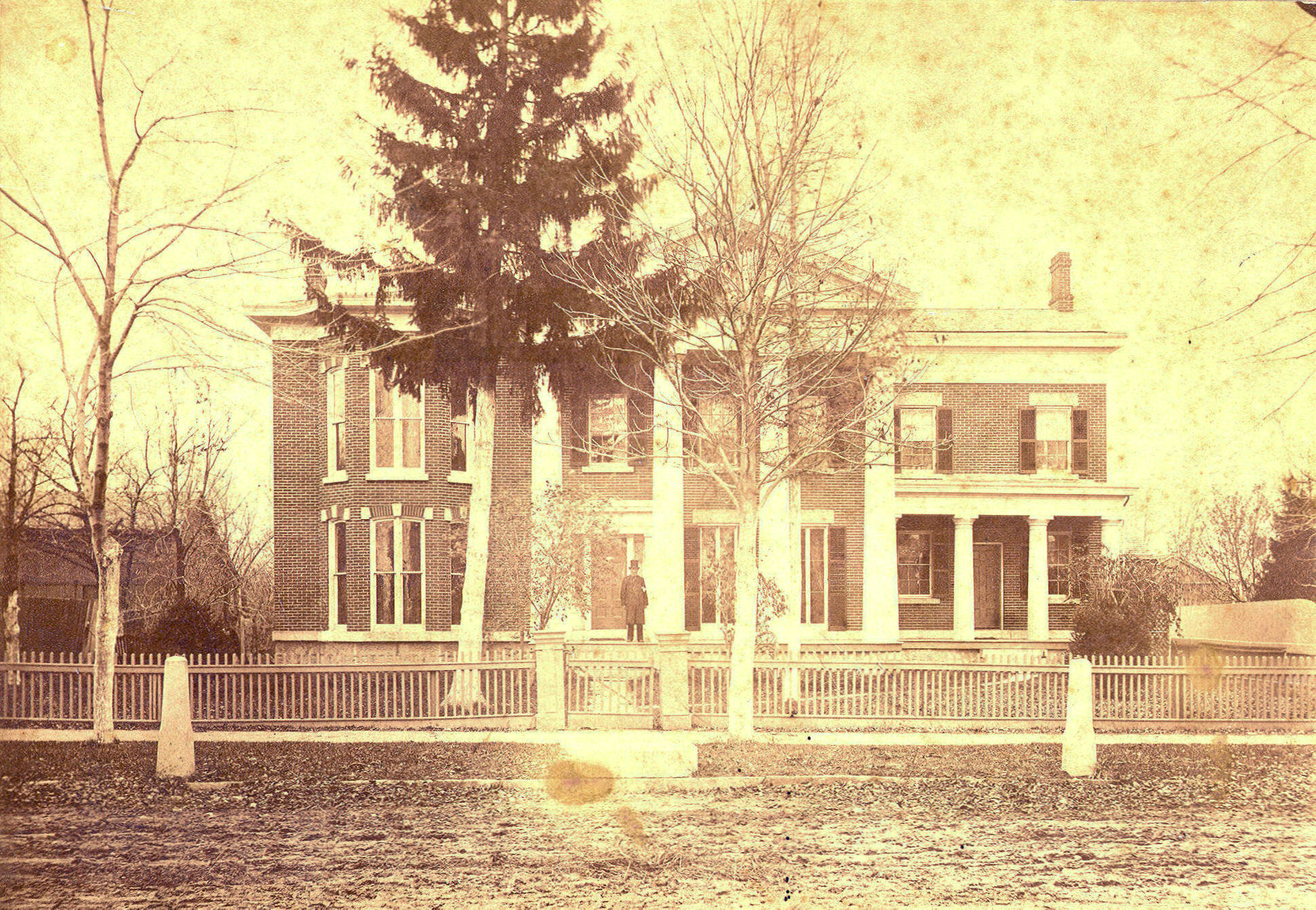
The house c. 1877

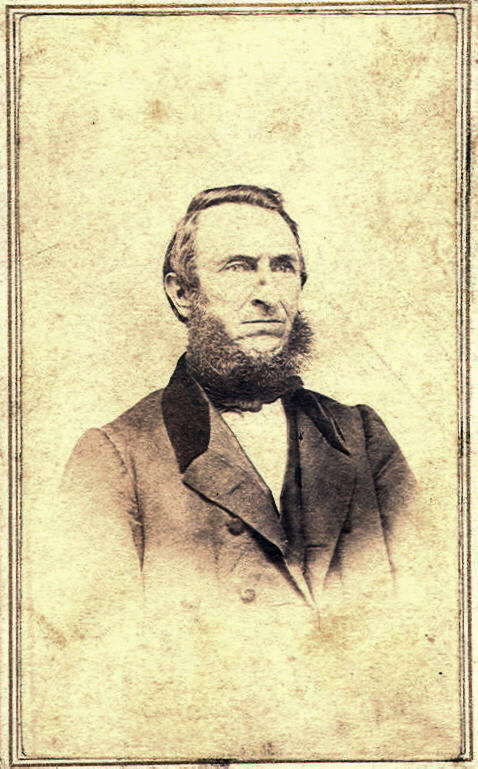
James Russell Webster of Waterloo, New York, ca. 1850s

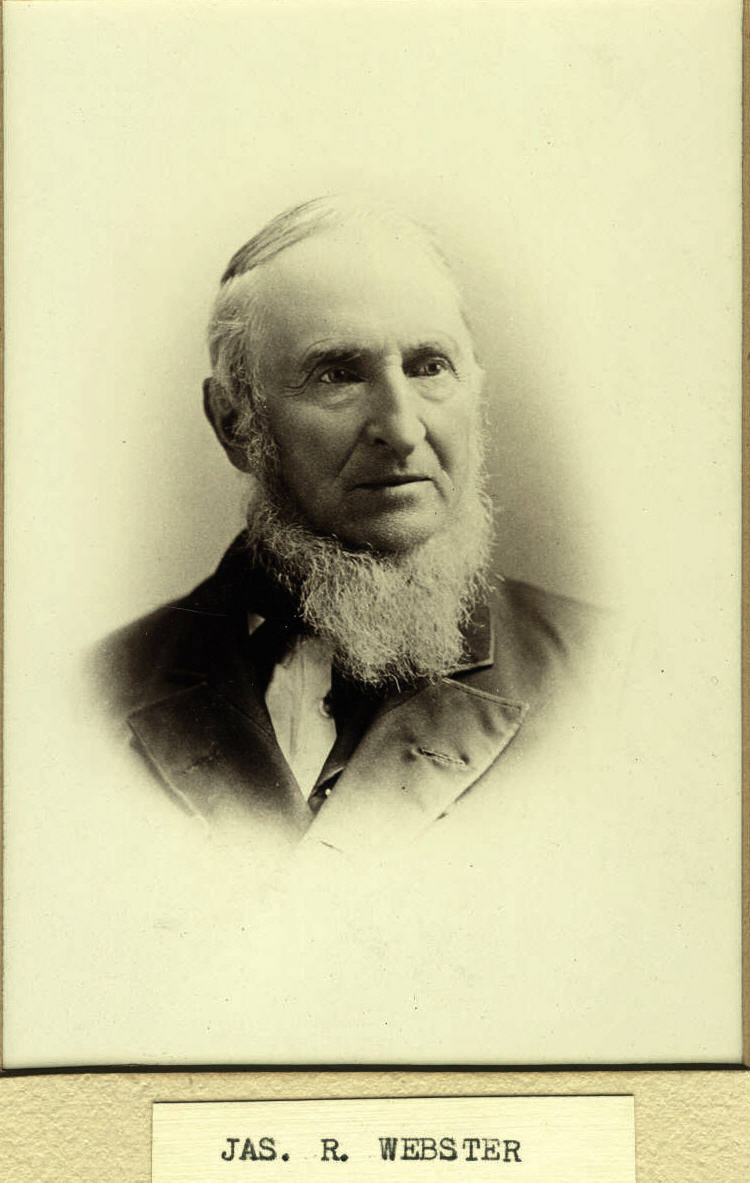
James Russell Webster of Waterloo, New York, ca. 1870s
