= Waterloo Library =

- U.S. National Register of Historic Places
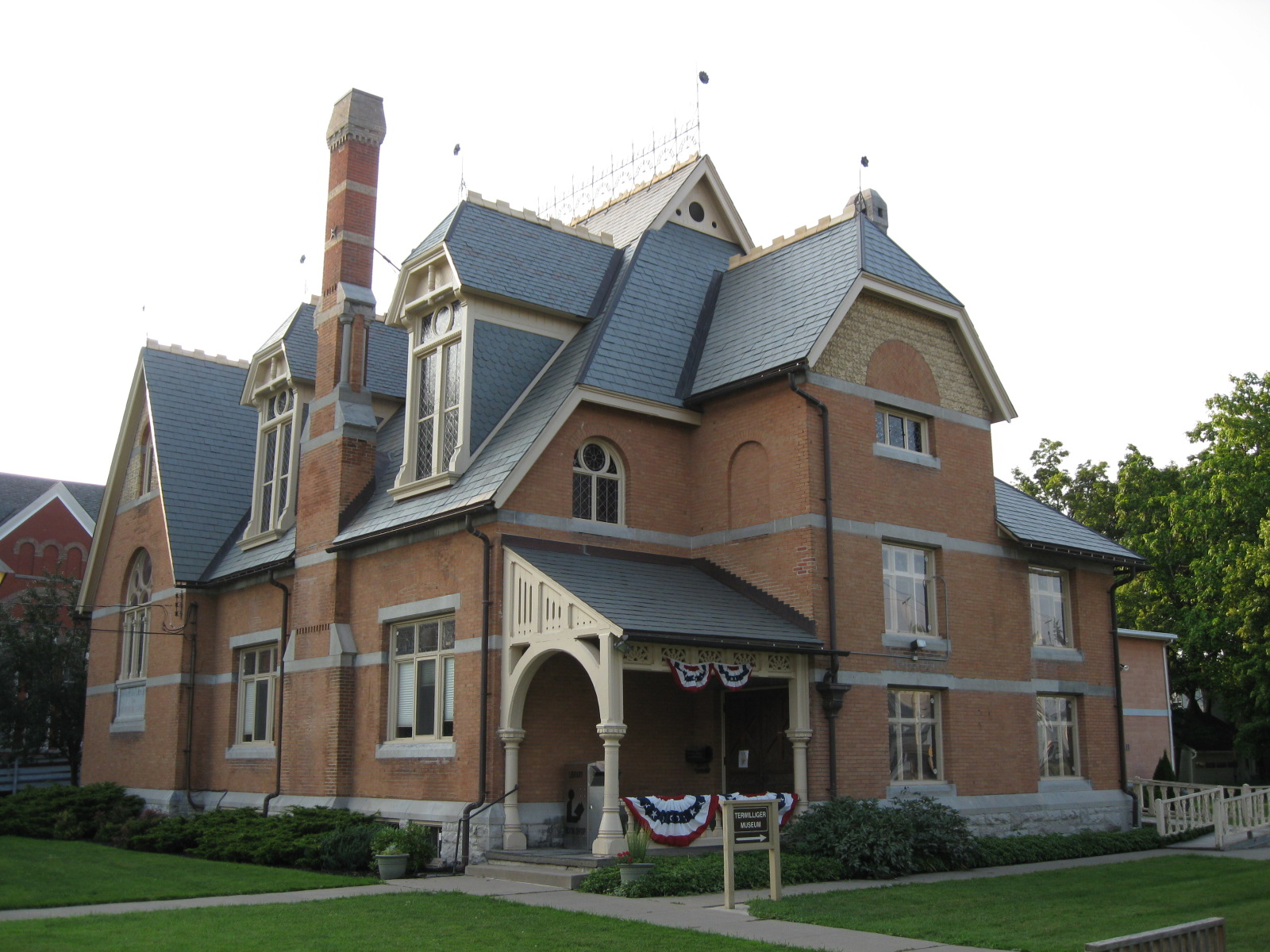
- Waterloo Library, August 2009

- Location within New York Location within the United States
- Location: 31 Williams St., Waterloo, New York
- Coordinates: 42°54′20″N 76°51′40″W
- Area: 1 acre (0.40 ha)
- Built: 1883
- Architectural style: Queen Anne
- NRHP reference No.: 96000676
- Added to NRHP: June 14, 1996

Waterloo Library, also known as the Waterloo Library and Historical Society, is a historic library building located at Waterloo in Seneca County, New York. The second story of the two-story frame structure contains a small theater.

It was built in 1883 in the Queen Anne style and is sheathed in brick. The structure is composed of a two-story main block with a three-story projecting pavilion and one-story intersecting gable wing. It features a number of distinctive Victorian era features such as steeply pitched and intersecting gable roofs; stone elements such as lintels, belt courses, sills, and chimney abutments and caps; and terra cotta wall surfaces and ridge blocks.

It was listed on the National Register of Historic Places in 1996.
