= William H. Burton House =

Historic house in New York, United States

- U.S. National Register of Historic Places
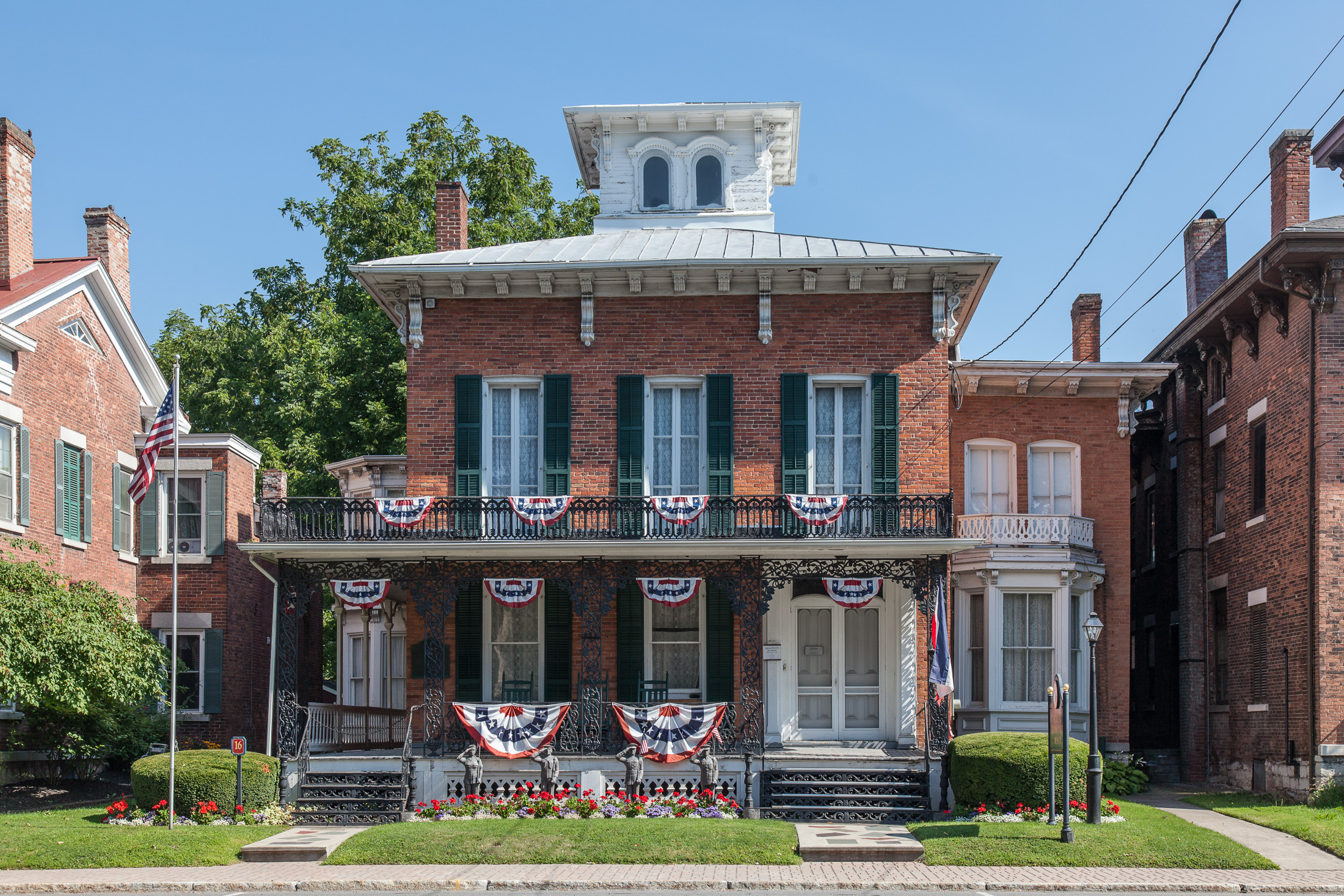
- William H. Burton House in 2013

- Location within New York Location within the United States
- Location: 35 E. Main St., Waterloo, New York
- Coordinates: 42°54′16″N 76°51′41″W
- Area: less than one acre
- Built: 1870
- Architectural style: Italianate
- NRHP reference No.: 96000675
- Added to NRHP: June 14, 1996

William H. Burton House, also known as the National Memorial Day Museum, is a historic home located at Waterloo in Seneca County, New York. It consists of a 2 1/2-story, three-bay offset front entrance main block with two rear wings. The original 1830s Federal-style residence was modified to its present Italianate style in about 1870 and features a hipped roof and cupola. In 1965, the building was purchased by the Waterloo Library and Historical Society to house collections and memorabilia related to the birth of Memorial Day in Waterloo in 1866.

It was listed on the National Register of Historic Places in 1996.

== Gallery ==
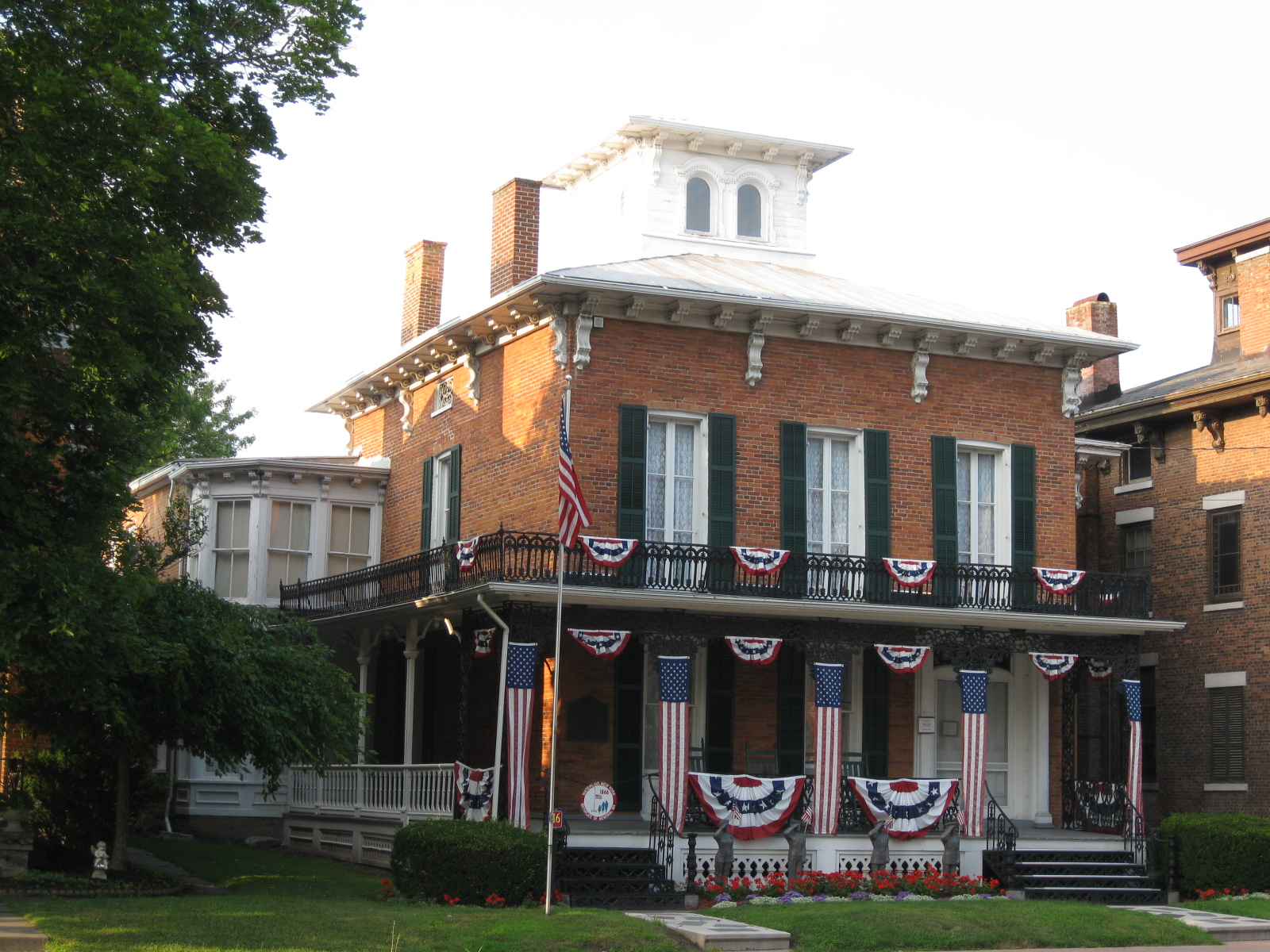
William H. Burton House, August 2009
