= Seneca County Courthouse Complex at Ovid =

- U.S. National Register of Historic Places
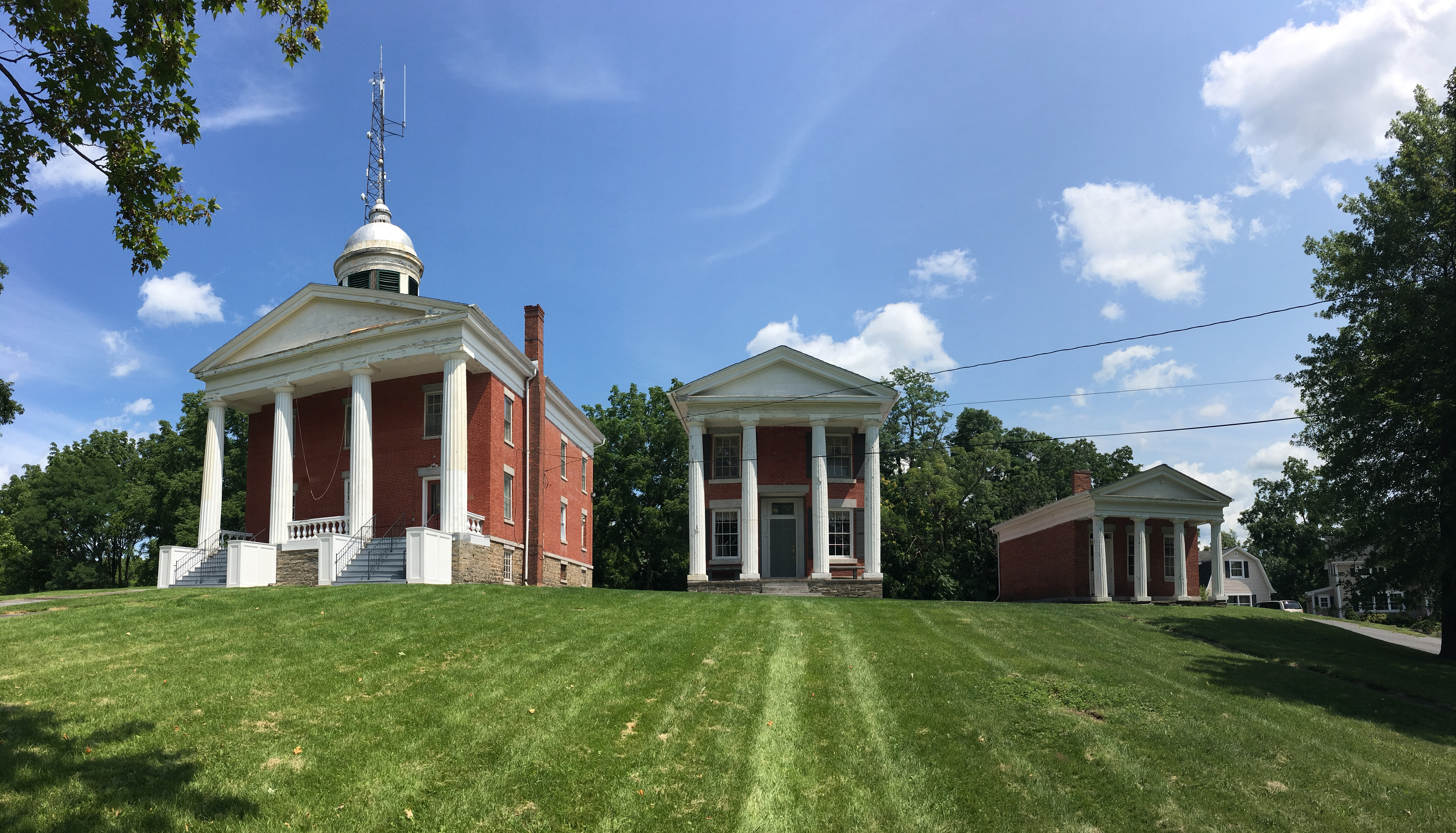
- Seneca County Courthouse Complex at Ovid, August 2017

- Location within New York Location within the United States
- Interactive map showing the location for Seneca County Courthouse Complex af Ovid
- Location: NY 414, Ovid, New York
- Coordinates: 42°40′36″N 76°49′19″W
- Area: 3 acres (1.2 ha)
- Built: 1845
- Architect: Latham, O.B. & O.S.; Bennett, Horace H.
- Architectural style: Neo-Classical
- NRHP reference No.: 76001277
- Added to NRHP: December 12, 1976

Seneca County Courthouse Complex at Ovid, also known as the "Three Bears", is a historic courthouse complex located at Ovid in Seneca County, New York. The 1845 courthouse, known as "Papa Bear", is a 2 1/2-story, three-by-four-bay, Neoclassical brick structure with a monumental frame pedimented portico supported by four Doric order columns and topped by a cupola. The "Old" Clerk's Office, known as "Baby Bear", was also constructed in 1845 and is similar in design and construction. The "New" Clerk's Office, known as "Mama Bear", was constructed about 1860 and is also of the same, simple Doric design.

It was listed on the National Register of Historic Places in 1976.
