= Ovid, New York =

- Town
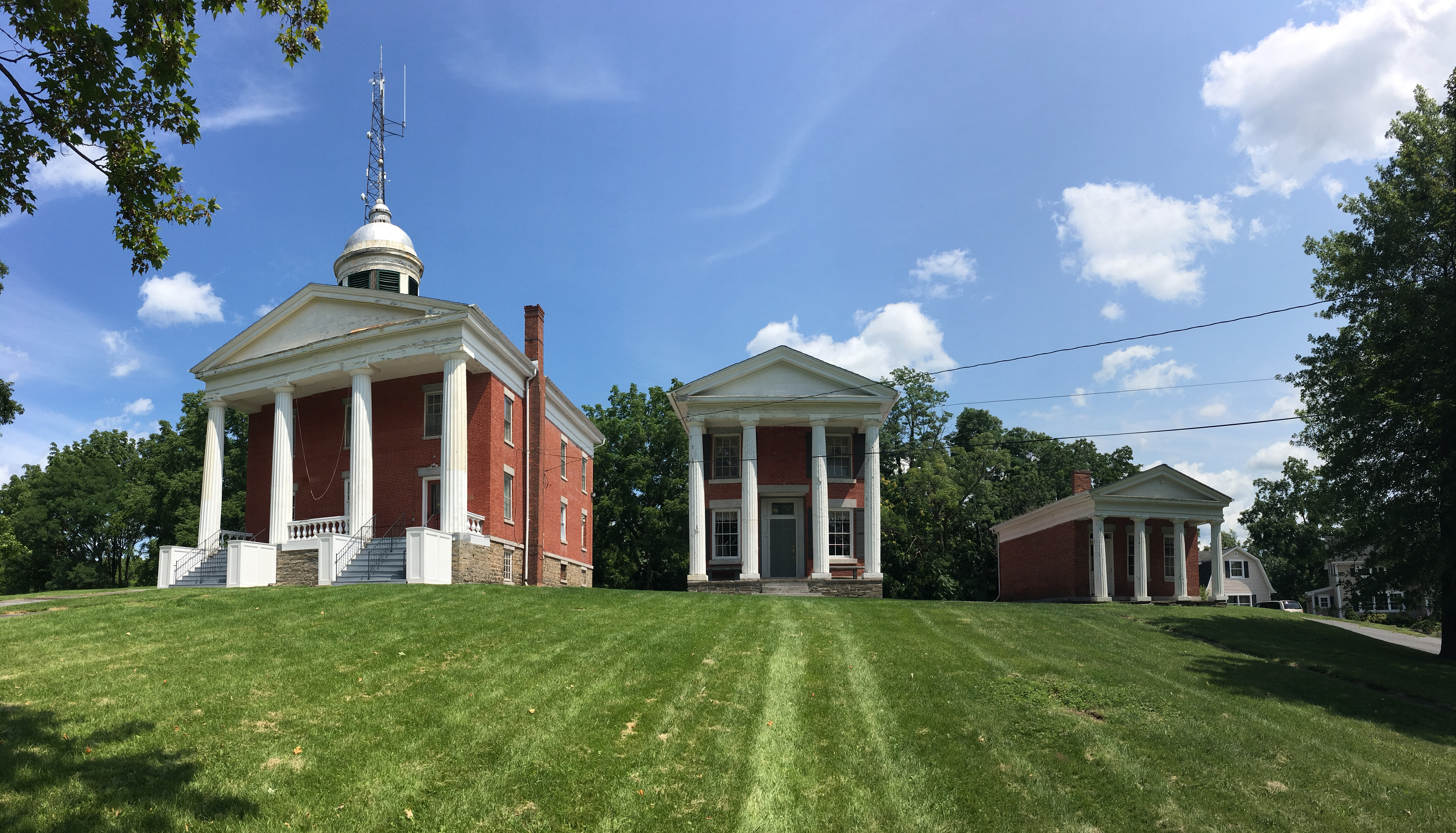
- Seneca County Courthouse Complex at Ovid

- Location within the state of New York
- Coordinates: 42°39′21″N 76°47′23″W
- Country: United States
- State: New York
- County: Seneca
- Settled: 1789
- Established: March 5, 1794

Government
  - Type: Town Board
  - Supervisor: Walter Prouty
  - Clerk: Cathy Kerns
  - Court: Justice Louis VanCleef (Ovid & Lodi town courts)

Area
  - Total: 38.75 sq mi (100.37 km^{2})
  - Land: 30.86 sq mi (79.93 km^{2})
  - Water: 7.89 sq mi (20.44 km^{2})
- Elevation: 1,020 ft (311 m)

Population (2020)
  - Total: 2,847
  - Estimate (2022): 2,826
  - Density: 92.3/sq mi (35.62/km^{2})
- Time zone: UTC-5 (Eastern (EST))
  - Summer (DST): UTC-4 (EDT)
- ZIP code: 14521
- Area code: 607
- FIPS code: 36-55827
- GNIS feature ID: 0979332
- Website: https://townofovidny.gov/

Ovid is a town in Seneca County, New York, United States. The population was 2,847 at the 2020 census. The town is named after the Roman poet Ovid, a name assigned by a clerk interested in the classics.

The Town of Ovid contains a village also called Ovid, one of the county seats of Seneca County. The town is in the southern part of the county, extending between Seneca Lake to the west and Cayuga Lake to the east, and southeast of Geneva, New York.

== History ==
The town was the native land of the part of the Iroquois.

The Sullivan Expedition passed through this area in 1779. The region was part of the Central New York Military Tract used to pay soldiers of the American Revolution. Andrew Dunlap, the first settler in the town, is believed to be also the first settler in the county.

The town was formed in 1794, while still part of Onondaga County. Part of Ovid was taken in 1802 to form the Town of Hector (now in Schuyler County). In 1817, part of Ovid was used to form the Town of Covert.

Ovid was, at times, on the south border of Seneca County as some of the other county towns were assigned to adjacent counties.

== Geography ==
According to the United States Census Bureau, the town has a total area of 38.8 square miles (100.4 km^{2}), of which, 30.9 square miles (79.9 km^{2}) of it is land and 7.9 square miles (20.4 km^{2}) of it (20.37%) is water.

The west town line, delineated by Seneca Lake is the border of Yates County, and the east town line, delineated by Cayuga Lake is the border of Cayuga County.

New York State Route 96, New York State Route 96A, New York State Route 414 converge at Ovid village. New York State Route 89 runs north-south along or near the shore of Cayuga Lake on the east side of the town.

== Demographics ==
Historical population
Census	Pop.	Note	%±
1820	2,654		—
1830	2,756		3.8%
1840	2,721		−1.3%
1850	2,248		−17.4%
1860	2,538		12.9%
1870	2,403		−5.3%
1880	3,569		48.5%
1890	3,651		2.3%
1900	3,734		2.3%
1910	3,355		−10.1%
1920	2,855		−14.9%
1930	2,843		−0.4%
1940	3,200		12.6%
1950	3,442		7.6%
1960	3,097		−10.0%
1970	3,107		0.3%
1980	2,530		−18.6%
1990	2,306		−8.9%
2000	2,757		19.6%
2010	2,311		−16.2%
2020	2,847		23.2%
2022 (est.)	2,826	▼	−0.7%
U.S. Decennial Census

As of the census of 2010, there were 2,311 people, 958 households, and 592 families residing in the town. The population density was 74.8 inhabitants per square mile (28.9/km^{2}). The racial makeup of the town was 97.1% White, 0.6% Black or African American, 0.1% Native American, 0.3% Asian, 0.0% Pacific Islander, 0.6% from other races, and 1.4% from two or more races. Hispanic or Latino of any race were 1.6% of the population.

There were 958 households, out of which 21.6% had children under the age of 18 living with them, 47.7% were married couples living together, 8.5% had a female householder with no husband present, and 38.2% were non-families. 30.9% of all households were made up of individuals, and 13.7% had someone living alone who was 65 years of age or older. The average household size was 2.39 and the average family size was 2.99.

In the town, the population was spread out, with 25.1% under the age of 20, 6.6% from 20 to 24, 19.5% from 25 to 44, 31.8% from 45 to 64, and 17.0% who were 65 years of age or older. The median age was 43.9 years. For every 100 females, there were 101.1 males. For every 100 females age 18 and over, there were 99.0 males.

The median income for a household in the town was $43,702, and the median income for a family was $53,750. Males had a median income of $35,476 versus $35,385 for females. The per capita income for the town was $22,015. About 10.9% of families and 15.8% of the population were below the poverty line, including 10.0% of those under age 18 and 21.7% of those age 65 or over.

=== Housing ===
There were 1,211 housing units at an average density of 39.2 per square mile (15.1/km^{2}). 20.9% of housing units were vacant.

There were 958 occupied housing units in the town. 712 were owner-occupied units (74.3%), while 246 were renter-occupied (25.7%). The homeowner vacancy rate was 1.7% of total units. The rental unit vacancy rate was 8.5%.

NOTE: It is common for resort communities to have higher than normal vacant house counts. Many are vacation homes which are seasonal and not regularly occupied.

== Civic Groups ==
Casey to the Rescue Dog Transport is an all-volunteer organization that rescues 600 animals each year and transports them to permanent homes.

Friends of the Three Bears preserves the buildings known as the (historic Seneca County) courthouse complex and implements art, music and other educational programs and events.

== Communities and locations in the Town of Ovid ==
- Coan Corners – A location near the south town line on NY-96A.
- Gilbert – A hamlet southwest of Ovid village at the junction of County Roads 131 and 132.
- Kidders – A hamlet on the shore of Cayuga Lake and County Road 153, south of Sheldrake.
- Ovid – The Village of Ovid at the junction of NY-96 and NY-96A.
- Scott Corners – A location west of Sheldrake Springs on County Road 139.
- Sheldrake – A hamlet on the shore of Cayuga Lake on County Road 153.
- Sheldrake Creek – A stream entering Cayuga Lake by Sheldrake.
- Sheldrake Springs – A hamlet in the eastern part of Ovid on NY-96.
- Simpson Creek – A stream passing by Ovid village and flowing into Seneca Lake.
- Starett Corners – A location in the southeast part of the town, south of Sheldrake Springs.
- Weyers Point – A projection into Cayuga Lake near the north town line.
- Willard – A hamlet at the north town line by Seneca Lake on County Road 132.
- Willard State Hospital – A former state mental hospital in the northwest of Ovid.
- Willard Wildlife Management Area – A conservation area by Seneca Lake.
