= Seneca =

Seneca may refer to:

== People, fictional characters and language ==
- Seneca (name), a list of people and fictional characters with the given name or surname

- Seneca the Elder (c. 54 BC – c. AD 39), a Roman rhetorician, writer, and father of the stoic philosopher Seneca
- Seneca the Younger (c. 4 BC – AD 65), a Roman Stoic philosopher, statesman, and dramatist

- Seneca people, one of the six Haudenosaunee tribes, native to the area south of Lake Ontario (present day New York state)
  - Seneca language, the language of the Seneca people

== Places ==
=== United States ===
==== New York State ====
- Seneca County, New York
- Seneca Falls, New York, a town in Seneca County
- Seneca, New York, a town in Ontario County
- Seneca Village, New York City, a former settlement in Manhattan that was displaced to create Central Park

==== Other communities ====
- Seneca, California, an unincorporated community
- Seneca, Illinois, a village
- Seneca, Kansas, a city
- Seneca, Keweenaw County, Michigan, an unincorporated community
- Seneca, Maryland, an unincorporated community
- Seneca, Michigan, an unincorporated community
- Seneca, Missouri, a city
- Seneca, Nebraska, a village
- Seneca, New Mexico, an unincorporated community
- Seneca, Oregon, a city
- Seneca, Pennsylvania, a census-designated place
- Seneca, South Carolina, a city
- Seneca, South Dakota, a town
- Seneca, Wisconsin (disambiguation), various places
- Seneca County, Ohio
- Seneca Township (disambiguation)

==== Water features ====
- Seneca Creek (New Mexico/Oklahoma)
- Seneca Creek (North Fork South Branch Potomac River), West Virginia
- Seneca Creek (Potomac River), Maryland
- Seneca Lake (New York), the largest of the Finger Lakes
- Senecaville Lake or Seneca Lake, Ohio, a reservoir
- Seneca River (New York), the outlet of Seneca Lake
- Seneca River (South Carolina)

==== Other United States ====
- Seneca Army Depot, Seneca County, New York
- Seneca Caverns (Ohio)
- Seneca Caverns (West Virginia)
- Seneca Historic District (disambiguation)
- Seneca Park (disambiguation)
- Seneca Rocks, a large crag and local landmark in West Virginia

=== Canada ===
- Seneca Township, a historic township in Haldimand County, Ontario

=== Outer space ===
- Seneca (crater), a lunar crater
- 2608 Seneca, an asteroid

== Brands and enterprises ==
- Seneca Data, an American custom computer manufacturer and technology distributor
- Seneca Foods, a major fruit and vegetable processor
- Seneca Oil, an American oil company formed in 1858

== Education ==
- Seneca College, Toronto, Ontario, Canada
- Seneca Institute – Seneca Junior College, an African-American school in Seneca, South Carolina, from 1899 to 1939
- Seneca High School (disambiguation), various schools in the United States

== Music ==
- Senakah (formerly Seneca), an alternative rock band from Limerick, Ireland
- "Seneca", a song from the 2001 album Standards by the band Tortoise

== Aircraft ==
- Piper PA-34 Seneca, a light twin-engine aircraft
- YH-41 Seneca, a US Army version of the Cessna CH-1 helicopter

== Ships ==
- USS Seneca, five US Navy ships
- USCGC Seneca (1908), a US Coast Guard cutter, decommissioned in 1936
- USCGC Seneca (WMEC-906), a US Coast Guard cutter

== Train stations ==
- Seneca Avenue (BMT Myrtle Avenue Line), a station of the New York City Subway
- Seneca station (Buffalo Metro Rail), a railway station in Buffalo, New York, US
- Seneca Station (Illinois), a Chicago, Rock Island and Pacific Railroad station in Seneca, Illinois

== Other uses ==
- Seneca Presbyterian Church, Stanley, New York, on the US National Register of Historic Places
- LORAN-C transmitter Seneca, a radio navigation transmitter operated by the U.S. Coast Guard
