= List of New York State Historic Markers in Seneca County, New York =

This is an incomplete list of New York State Historic Markers in Seneca County, New York.

== Listings county-wide ==
	Marker name	Image	Date designated	Location	City or Town	Coords	Marker text
1	OLD BAPTIST CHURCH			On Nys 96 At Covert	Covert, Town Of, New York		Founded Covert, N.y, Feb. 16, 1803. 1St Pastor Minor Thomas. "Mother Church" Of Seneca Baptist Association. Old Covert Cemetery Nearby
2	OLD SCHOOL HOUSE			On Ys 96A At Interlaken	Covert, Town Of, New York		This Building Was The 2D Used For School Purposes In Farmersville, New York In 1845 Was Known As The "Farmersville Institute"
3	THE BEEHIVE			On Nys 96 At Interlaken	Covert, Town Of, New York		Tavern Of Pioneer Days Erected 1824 3Rd Floor Used For Various Meeting
4	BURROUGHS POINT			On Nys 89 About 3 Miles North Of Canoga	Fayette, Town Of, New York		Site Of Indian Village Destroyed During Sullivan Campaign, 1779. Troops Under Col. Henry Dearborn Encamped Here
5	CANOGA			On Nys 89 At Canoga	Fayette, Town Of, New York		Ga-no-geh Of The Indians Included In Reservation By Indian Sachem Fish-carrier By Treaty Of 1795
6	CANOGA CREEK			On Nys 89 About 1½ Mi. North Of Canoga	Fayette, Town Of, New York		Site Of The Indian Village Of Skannayutenate Red Jacket, The Indian Orator Was Born Here
7	CANOGA LANDING			On Town Rd. Shore Cayuga L. About 1½ Mi. S.e. Of Canoga	Fayette, Town Of, New York		Site Of Indian Village Destroyed During Sullivan Campaign, 1779 Frontenac Is. Just East & Nearly Across The Lake
8	CANOGA SPRING			On County Rd. About 3/4 Mi. West Of Canoga	Fayette, Town Of, New York		Referred To In The Survey Of Seneca Co. By John Delafield In 1850 As Bubbling Pure Nitrogen Gas
9	CAYUGA LAKE			On Nys 89 About 3 Miles South Of Canoga	Fayette, Town Of, New York		Site Of Landing Of Moravian Missionaries Zeisberger And Cammerhoff June 27, 1750
10	FIRST			On County Rd. About 3 Mis. West Of Canoga	Fayette, Town Of, New York		Sunday School In Fayette, 1819, Taught Here In Old Log School House By Deacon Hugh Mc Allister
11	SITE OF			On Nys 89 About 3 Miles North Of East Varick	Fayette, Town Of, New York		Howland's Landing Formerly A Landing And Warehouse, Shown On The Delafield Map Of 1852
12	SITE OF			On Town Rd. On Shore Cayuga Lake About 2½ Mis. S.e. Of Canoga	Fayette, Town Of, New York		Indian Village Destroyed By Troops Under Col. Henry Dearbornn Sept. 21, 1779
13	SITE OF TAVERN			On County Rd. About 1 Mile North Of Macdougall	Fayette, Town Of, New York		Kept By Captain Nathan Cook 1756–1838 His Grandson, Stephen V. Harkness Lived Here-one Of Founders Of Standard Oil Company
14	[ARROW] 1 MILE			On Nys 89 About 1/2 South Of Canoga	Fayette, Town Of, New York		Indian Village At Canoga Landing Destroyed During Sullivan Campaign 1779
15	[ARROW] 1 MILE			On Nys 89 About 1½ Mis. South Of Canoga	Fayette, Town Of, New York		Site Of Indian Village Destroyed By Troops Under Col. Henry Dearborn Sept. 21, 1779
16	SULLIVAN TRAIL			On Nys 96 About 1½ Miles North Of Interlaken	Ovid, Town Of, New York		Before Settlement By White Men Co. Henry Dearborn Of The Sullivan Expedition Viewed Cayuga Lake Here, Sept. 22, 1779
17	THOMAS R. LOUNSBURY			On Nys 414, Vlge. Of Ovid	Ovid, Town Of, New York		Illustrious Yale Professor Born Here 1835. Son Of Rev. Thomas Lounsbury And Mary Janette Woodward. Student Of Ovid Academy
18	DEAN'S COVE			On Nys 89 About 2½ Miles South Of East Varick	Romulus, Town Of, New York		(Swah-ya-wa-nah) Indian Village Destroyed By Detachments From Sullivan's Army September 22, 1779
19	DEGORY PROWTT			On Nys 89 About 4 Miles South Of East Varick	Romulus, Town Of, New York		Drummer Boy, 1776–1783 At Siege Of Fort Stanwix On The Sullivan Expedition, At Surrender Of Cornwallis, Lived A Mile West Of Here.
20	KEN-DAI-A			On Nys 96A About 5 Miles Northwest Of Ovid	Romulus, Town Of, New York		Indian Village Destroyed By Sullivan's Army September 17, 1779
21	WHITNEY'S LANDING			On Nys 89 About 6 Miles South Of East Varick	Romulus, Town Of, New York		Later Known As Jacacks' Landing Was A Prominent Landing Shown In The Delafield Map Of 1852
22	ALONG NORTH SIDE OF RIVER			On Us 20 & Nys 5 About 1 Mile East Of Waterloo	Seneca Falls Town Of, New York		Marched Sullivan's Forces Expedition Commanded By Col.peter Gansevoort & Lt. Col. William Butler Sept. 20-21, 1779
23	BRIDGEPORT			On Co. Rd. About 2 Mis. E. Of Seneca Falls	Seneca Falls Town Of, New York		Formerly Cayuga Ferry & W. Cayuga Terminus Of State Line Bridge Prominent When Auburn Was "Hardenbergh's Corner"
24	ELIZABETH CADY			On Washington St., Seneca Falls	Seneca Falls Town Of, New York		Stanton Promoter Of The First Woman's Rights Convention Lived Here. Convention Was Held Across The River
25	FIRST CONVENTION FOR			On Us 20 & Nys 5, Seneca Falls	Seneca Falls Town Of, New York		Woman's Right Was Held On This Corner 1848
26	HOME OF			At Intersection W. Bayard & Sackett Sts., Seneca Falls	Seneca Falls Town Of, New York		Gary V. Sackett 1790–1885 Judge Court Of Common Pleas-promoter Of Canal System
27	KINGDOM CEMETERY			On Us 20 & Nys 5 About 1 Mile East Of Waterloo	Seneca Falls Town Of, New York		Reserved In Deed To Thomas Lawrence. Here Until 1856 Were Mills, Distilleries, Taverns, School, Justice Ct., Masonic Lodge, Race Track.
28	MILITARY ROUTE			On Us 20 & Nys 5 At The East End Of Waterloo	Seneca Falls Town Of, New York		Of The Sullivan-clinton Army On Its Campaign Against The British And Indians Of Western New York In 1779
29	MYNDERSE			On Us 20 & Nys 5, Seneca Falls	Seneca Falls Town Of, New York		Academy Named For Co. Wilhelmus Mynderse, Founder Of Seneca Falls
30	OLD GENESEE			On Co. Rd. About 1/2 Mile East Of Seneca Falls	Seneca Falls Town Of, New York		Stage Route Cayuga Lake Bridge Made This The Main Route Until The Erie Canal Of 1822 And The Railway Of 1840
31	POTTER INN FARM			On Co. Rd. About 1/2 Mile East Of Seneca Falls	Seneca Falls Town Of, New York		Nathaniel J. Potter, Innkeeper Blacksmith On Genesee Road, 1801–1808. His Son, Henry's. Potter, Lived Here. 1St Pres. Western Union Telegraph, 1851.
32	SITE OF INDIAN VILLAGE			On Nys 89 About 1½ Miles North Of Canoga	Seneca Falls Town Of, New York		Gar-non-de-yo Destroyed During Sullivan Campaign Sept. 21, 1779
33	VAN CLEEF LAKE			On Bank Of Lake Near Intersection Trinity La. & Fall St., Seneca Falls	Seneca Falls Town Of, New York		Named For George Cunningham Van Cleef, One Of First White Children Born In Seneca County 1797
34	CRUSOE ISLAND			On Nys 414 At Crusoe	Tyre, Town Of, New York		Site Of Crusoe Post Office Until 1852. Home Of Senator David H. Evans (1837–1920). Stage Relaying Barns Were Located Here
35	BIRTHPLACE OF			On Nys 89 About 1 Mile North Of East Varick	Varick, Town Of, New York		Isaac Philips Roberts July 24, 1833 Representative Extra- Ordinary Of American Farmer
36	EAST VARICK			On Nys 89 At East Varick	Varick, Town Of, New York		Once Prominent Landing With Hotel, Warehouse, Stores, Residences. Early Home Of Roberts, Phillips, Burroughs, Christopher, Barrick Families
37	PRESBYTERIAN			On Nys 96 In Village Of Romulus	Varick, Town Of, New York		Church Organized 1796 By Rev. Daniel Thatcher Of Virginia This Building Erected 1838
38	SITE OF			On Nys 89 About 1½ Miles S. Of East Varick	Varick, Town Of, New York		Frisbie's Ferry A Now Extinct Hamlet With Store, Mills, Distillery, Tavern, And Ferry To Aurora, 1796.
39	SITE OF			On Nys 89 About 2 Miles North Of East Varick	Varick, Town Of, New York		Clarktown A Now Extinct Hamlet With Warehouse, Stores, Tavern, Pottery, And Ferry To Levanna Across The Lake

== See also ==
- List of New York State Historic Markers
- National Register of Historic Places listings in New York
- List of National Historic Landmarks in New York
