= Willard =

Willard may refer to:

== People ==
- Willard (name)

== Geography ==
=== Places in the United States ===
- Willard, Colorado
- Willard, Georgia
- Willard, Kansas
- Willard, Kentucky
- Willard, Michigan, a small unincorporated community in Beaver Township, Bay County, Michigan
- Willard, Missouri
- Willard, New Mexico
- Willard, New York
- Willard, North Carolina
- Willard, Ohio
- Willard, Utah
- Willard Bay, Utah, a reservoir
- South Willard, Utah
- Willard, Virginia
- Willard, Washington
- Willard, Rusk County, Wisconsin, a town
- Willard, Clark County, Wisconsin, an unincorporated community
- Willards, Maryland

=== Places other than settlements ===
- The Willard InterContinental Washington, a historic hotel in Washington, DC
- Willard House (disambiguation), several houses
- Willard Residential College, a Northwestern University residential hall
- J. Willard Marriott Library, at the University of Utah
- University of Illinois Willard Airport
- Willard Drug Treatment Center, a specialized state prison in New York focused on treatment of drug-addicted convicts
- Willard Park (Cleveland park), a park in downtown Cleveland, Ohio
- Willard Asylum for the Chronic Insane

== Entertainment ==
=== In fictional characters ===
- Willard Decker, fictitious character in the Star Trek universe
- Willard Whyte, character from the James Bond film Diamonds Are Forever
- Captain Willard, in Apocalypse Now

=== In film ===
- Willard (1971 film), a 1971 horror movie
- Willard (2003 film), a 2003 film based on the same story as the 1971 film

=== In music ===
- Willard (album), a 1970 album by John Stewart
- Willard (band), an early grunge band from Seattle
- The Willard, a Japanese punk rock band
- Willard Grant Conspiracy, an alt-country band from Massachusetts/California
- "Willard!", by Will Wood from "In case I make it," (2022), based on the 2003 film of the same name

== Other uses ==
- Emma Willard School, in Troy, New York
- Simon Willard clocks, produced in Massachusetts
- Willard Group, a financial gathering also known as G22
- Trivers–Willard hypothesis in evolutionary biology
- USS Willard Keith (DD-775), United States Navy ship
- A vehicle in the Grand Theft Auto series

== See also ==
- Justice Willard (disambiguation)
