= Sampson Air Force Base =

Former US Air Force base in Seneca County, New York

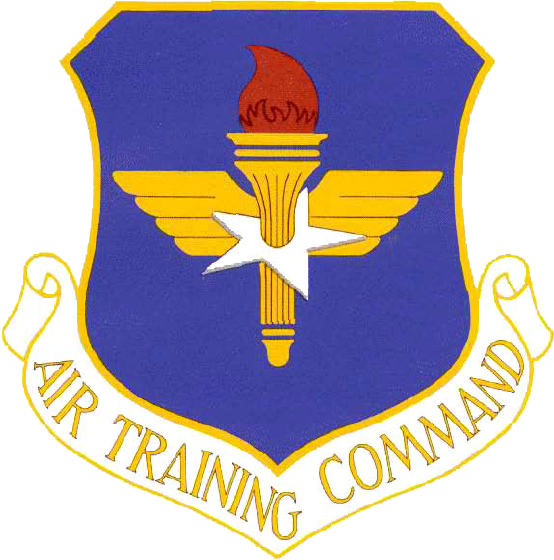
Sampson Air Force Base Naval Training Station Sampson
- Part of Air Training Command (ATC)
- Romulus, by Seneca Lake, New York
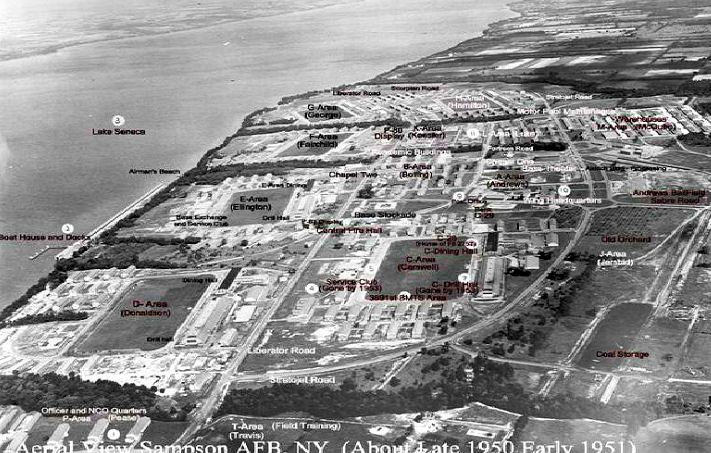
- Oblique photo of Sampson Air Force Base, about 1951, looking north

Site information
- Type: Air Force Base
- Controlled by: United States Air Force

Location
- Coordinates: 42°43′45″N 76°54′00″W

Site history
- Built: 1942
- In use: 1942–1956

Location of Sampson Air Force Base, New York

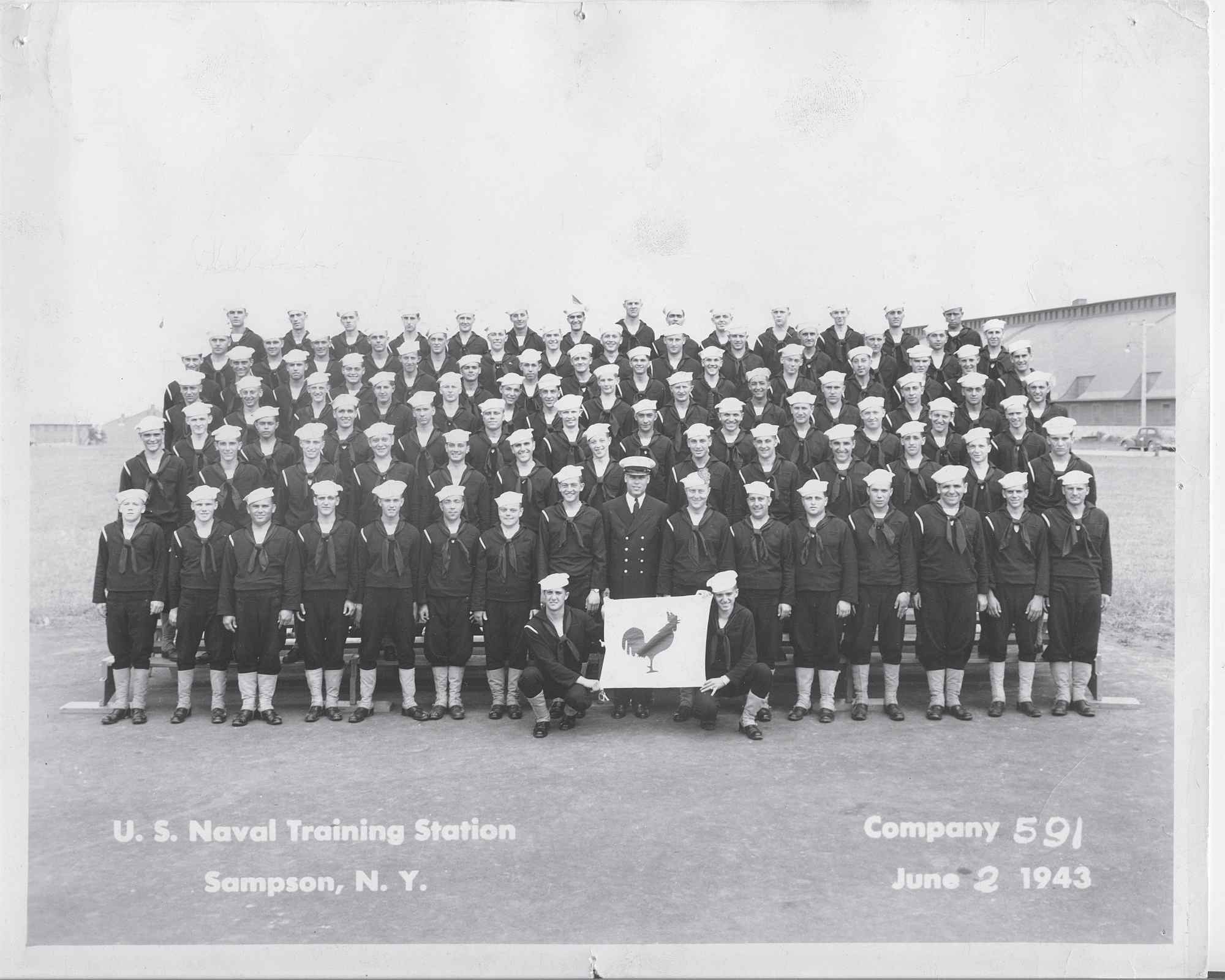
Navy graduate photo, Company 591 June 2, 1943

Sampson Air Force Base is a closed United States military facility in Romulus (Seneca County), last used by the United States Air Force Air Training Command as a Basic Military Training Center. It was closed in 1956 and put into caretaker status.

As of at least the 2000s, parts of the facility have been converted to a civil picnic area called Sampson State Park. In addition, the United States Navy operates the Naval Undersea Warfare Center (NUWC) sonar test facility on a part of the facility. However, most of the former base is abandoned.

== History ==
=== USNTS Sampson ===
The facility was established initially by the United States Navy as a Naval Training Station (USNTS Sampson) in 1942. The station was named after Rear Admiral William T. Sampson. The Navy obtained 2,600 acres of former farmland and also vineyards for the facility on the east side of Seneca Lake, New York. Construction of the facility took 270 days to complete. Along with the training station, a 1,500-bed hospital was constructed. The mission of USNTS Sampson was Naval basic training for large numbers of new recruits. During the war, over 411,000 recruits were trained at the station.

In conjunction with the building of Sampson, the United States Army established its Seneca Army Depot adjacent to the Naval Station which was used to store a wide variety of ammunitions.

=== Postwar use ===
With the end of the war, USNTS Sampson was closed, and turned over to the War Assets Administration in 1946. Most of the facility was taken over by New York State, which planned to establish a two-year junior community college on the facility, keeping most of the buildings and using it as a campus. The USN Hospital was eventually taken over by the state of New York, renaming it the Willard State Hospital Sampson Annex in 1947.

The station was used by NYS as a temporary college for 15,000 GI Bill students in July 1946. (5 barracks were moved to Hobart College in Geneva, New York, 7 were moved to Syracuse University) Sampson College operated from September 1946 to June 1949 and had matriculated 7,500 students of which 950 received two-year degrees.

In 1949, the former naval station was turned over to the United States Department of Agriculture, which used the buildings as warehouses and granaries. More than 110,000 bushels of excess wheat and 15,000 sacks of excess beans were stored at Sampson. In addition, the State of New York, realizing the scenic location of the former Naval Station, appropriated $50,000 for the creation of a state park at Sampson.

=== Sampson AFB ===
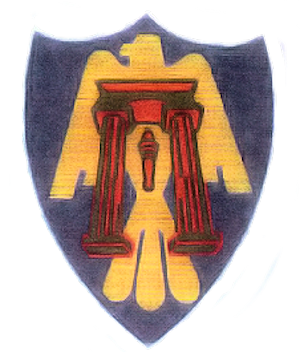
3650th Military Training Wing – Emblem

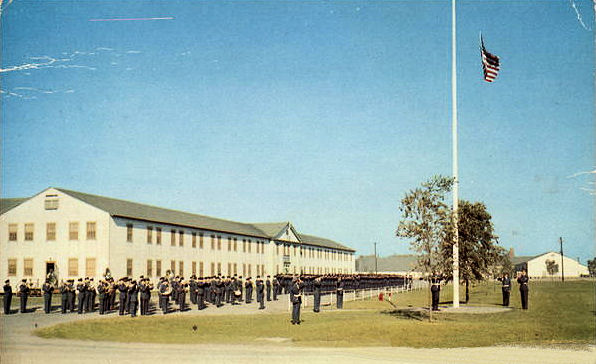
Retreat Ceremony in front of Base Headquarters

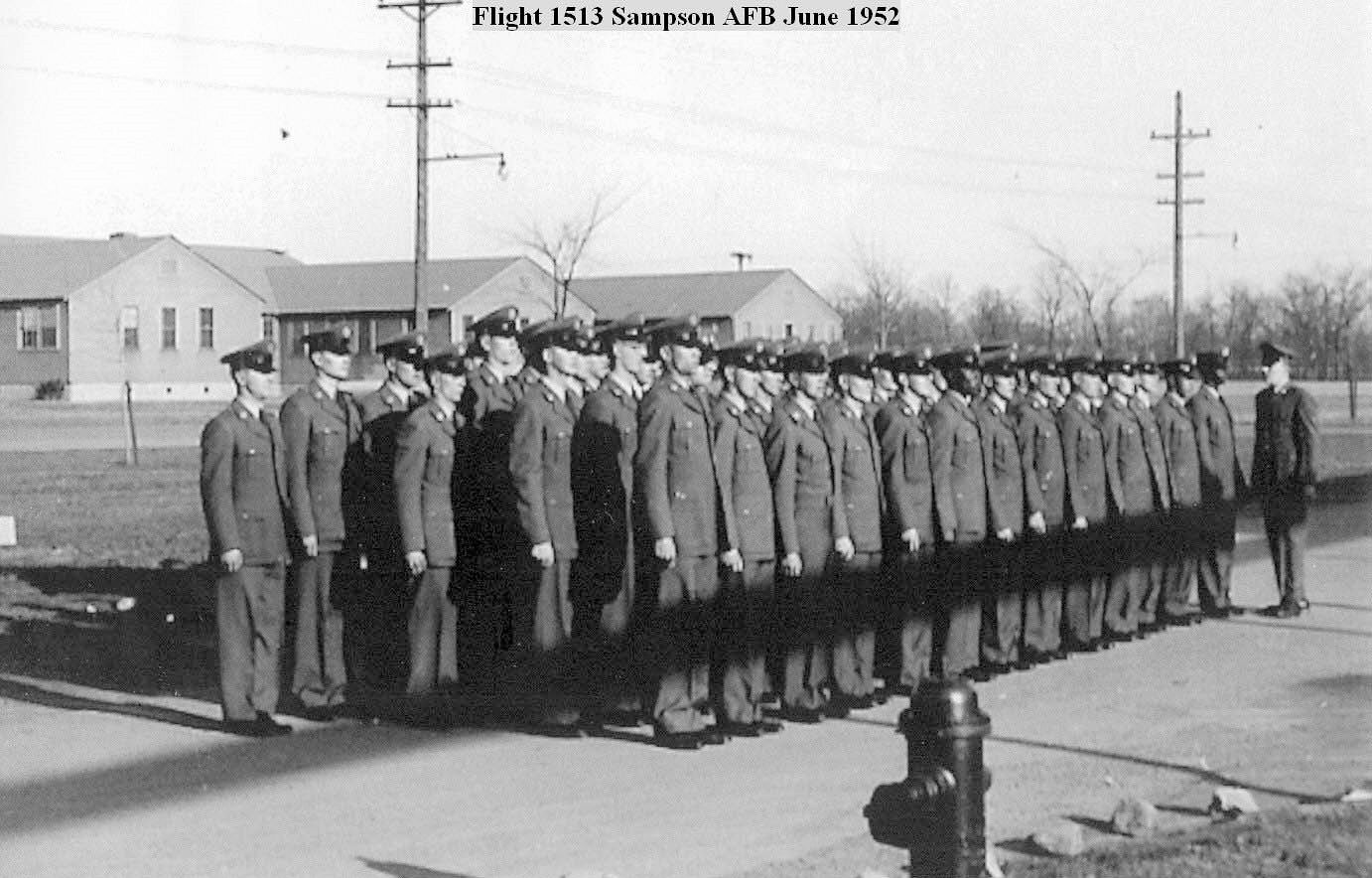
Wartime graduation of new airmen, BMT Flight 1513 3691 BMTS June 1952. Many of these airmen probably served in the Korean War after technical training.

With the outbreak of the Korean War, the United States Air Force took interest in the former Naval Station for use as a Basic Military Training (BMT) Base. Custody of most of the property of the training center was transferred to the Air Force in 1950, and the Air Force named the facility Sampson Air Force Base on 15 November 1950. With the Air Force establishing Sampson AFB, the park project was cancelled.

The Air Force spent about $6 million on renovations and beginning in February 1951 started training what would be 16,000 Air Force recruits. Air Training Command (ATC) established the 3650th Indoctrination (later Military Training) Wing to manage the base and conduct Basic Training, as its major facility at Lackland AFB, Texas was overflowing. During the first two weeks of 1951, the population at Lackland AFB jumped from 36,513 to over 70,000 people. In addition, a third BMT center was established at Parks AFB, California to accommodate new enlistees. The mission of Sampson AFB was to provide formal basic training for all male and female enlisted personnel not having sufficient previous military training; to establish and operate such assembly, processing and separation station as specifically directed; to provide a comprehensive counseling program for Basic Indoctrinee personnel in order that these airmen may be most effectively assigned in accordance with Air Force requirements; and to maintain training programs for accomplishing rehabilitation of garrison prisoners. The first trainees arrived on 1 Feb 1951. The base employed about 700 civilians and had 600 permanent party troops.

During the years before the Korean War, basic military training had lasted anywhere from 4 to 13 weeks. In the rush to flow recruits through the training system and into the theater of conflict, ATC reduced the course to seven weeks in 1950 and then to two weeks in January 1951. With the opening of Sampson and Parks AFB for BMT, Shortly thereafter, ATC increased basic military training from seven weeks to eight. In July 1952 the Air Staff approved a 12-week course, which ATC implemented on 1 August at Lackland and Parks and on 1 September at Sampson. However, after only two months, the Air Staff decided that the course should be shortened, and ATC developed an 11-week program to begin in January 1953. The host organization at Sampson was redesigned as the 3650th Military Training Wing, Air Training Command, in March 1953.

The Air Force also built a runway and other facilities at Sampson and converted the base to its needs. By 1953, a single paved 5,000 foot north–south runway (Rwwy 17/35) was completed and a control tower, fire station and aircraft parking ramp was built on the west side, with B-25 Mitchell, C-47 Skytrain, and C-45 Expeditor aircraft assigned.

With the end of the Korean War and cutbacks in the military budget afterwards, Air Training Command discontinued its basic training school at Sampson AFB on 1 July 1956. Shortly thereafter, ATC discontinued Sampson's 3650th Military Training Wing. By the time it was closed, over 300,000 airmen received basic training at Sampson AFB in preparation for service in the Korean War, as well as service in USAFE, Far East Air Force, and other United States Air Force major commands both in the United States and around the world.

Three months later, on 1 October 1956, control of Sampson AFB was transferred to the Rome Air Force Depot, Air Materiel Command and the base was placed in standby status.

The airfield was briefly served by Mohawk Airlines from 1954 to 1956.

=== Post military use ===
Starting in 1957 to 1960 the airfield and some officer housing on the lake shore (449 acres) were transferred to the Seneca Army Depot, the facility being renamed Sampson Army Airfield and used to support the depot.

The former hospital area was operated as a state school. In 1971, the State of New York closed the School due to budget cuts and while empty, a fire destroyed most of the main hospital complex. Contaminated by asbestos, the site was cleaned and is still owned by the Department of Mental Hygiene when it burned down in 1989. In 1960 the State of New York purchased and assumed ownership of all tracts of land on the former base at a cost of $500,000. Most of the buildings were dismantled and materials were sold for re-usage throughout the Finger Lakes Region. One of the Drill Halls is now in use at Middlebury College, Vermont. Major roads and identification signs remain today on the base.

At some point in the mid-1960s, the airfield was opened to civil use as North Star Seneca Airpark. The duration of the civilian use of the Seneca airfield has not been determined, but it was evidently a brief period as the Army returned it to military control during the Vietnam War and renamed it Seneca Army Airfield. It was used for security at Seneca Army Depot, with the former fire station being used as hangars for the helicopters supporting depot security. Air Force C-123 and C-130 cargo aircraft also used the runway on occasion for transporting personnel and material to the depot.

The Seneca Army Depot was identified for closure in 1995 as part of the BRAC process and Seneca AAF was closed by 2000.

== Today ==
Today the airfield 42°42′46″N 076°53′09″W is being developed into an emergency services training site. Just inside the gate is a brand new State Police barracks, and sharing the building is a police & fire training center. A new fire training tower was built southeast of the control tower, and the 7,000-foot runway is used for high-speed police pursuit training. The control tower & fire station are empty.

The majority of the former Air Force base today is now abandoned. While the streets exist, most of the land is vacant as a result of the 1960 New York State facilities removal. However, a large cluster of buildings in the northeast part of the base 42°44′13″N 76°54′02″W remain in a very deteriorated condition, some having roofs, some not. The main gate on Sampson State Park Road, west of the intersection with NY Highway 96A 42°43′45″N 76°53′35″W, still stands guard over the base.

The Sampson Air Force Museum 42°43′41″N 76°54′19″W is currently located in the building which was formerly the old stockade/brig. The displays are quite extensive, including a restored T-33 Shooting Star aircraft on static display and a Falcon Memorial statue.
