= Suessa Baldridge Blaine =

American writer of temperance pageants (1860–1932)

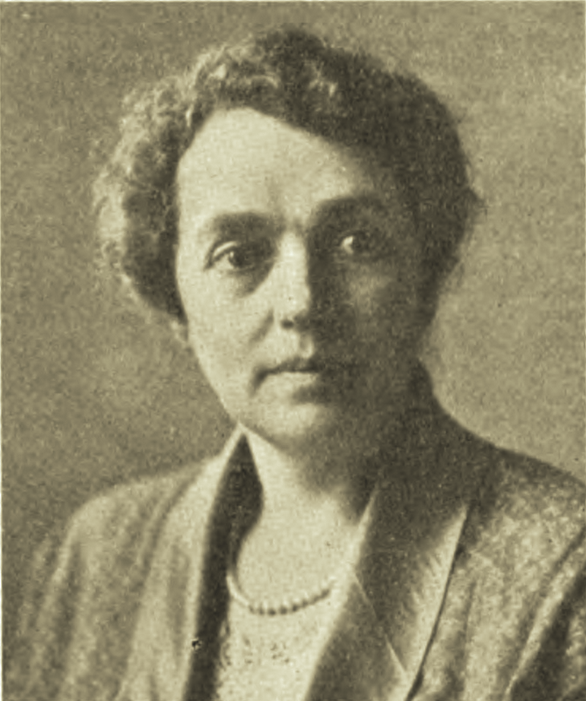
- Born: Suessa Baldridge; February 25, 1860; Varick, New York
- Died: May 15, 1932 (aged 72); Romulus, New York
- Education: Wheaton College Washington University in St. Louis
- Occupations: writer; activist; clubwoman
- Spouse: Don P. Blaine (m. 1890)
- Writing career
- Language: English
- Genre: pageants
- Subject: temperance movement
- Notable work: "Columbia's Congress"

Suessa Baldridge Blaine (February 25, 1860 – May 15, 1932) was an American writer of temperance pageants. She was connected with the Federated Woman's Clubs and organizations.

== Early life and education ==
Suessa Baldridge was born at Varick, New York, February 25, 1860.

She was educated at the Wheaton College and Washington University in St. Louis.

Blaine was reared in a Prohibition home, and while still a young girl, she became a very active participant at temperance meetings, where she won great favor for her songs and recitations. While at Wheaton College she joined the Young Woman's Christian Temperance Union (WCTU), and in her home town, she became an officer of that organization.

== Career ==
She married Don P. Blaine, of Romulus, New York, March 13, 1890, and after her marriage, lived at Ovid, New York. There, she served as president of the Ovid WCTU and as an officer of the Seneca County organization.

In 1894, when she removed to Washington, D.C., retaining a summer residence at Ovid. In Washington, she became a Young WCTU local president and general secretary of the Loyal Temperance Legion. In 1903, she became general secretary of the District of Columbia's Young WCTU and inaugurated an organizing campaign which won the national prize banner for the largest increase in membership in the United States. She was appointed a national Young WCTU organizer and retained this office, making frequent trips afield.

In 1910, she was elected to the position of organizer and lecturer of the National WCTU. Her most elaborate effort, a pageant-play called "Columbia's Congress", was launched in Washington in 1910, and later, this production was presented in some of the largest cities in the U.S. From 200 to 350 persons appeared in the cast.

Blaine was for many years a trustee of the District of Columbia Anti-Saloon League and an active worker in the campaign for Prohibition in the District. In 1913, Blaine was appointed by President Wilson as a delegate representing the United States Government at the Fourteenth International Congress on Alcoholism, at Milan, Italy. In April 1915, under the auspices of the Central WCTU and the Brooklyn Sunday School Union, Blain was in charge of rehearsals for "Columbia's Congress" a temperance play she wrote in 2011 involving two hundreds persons participants. In 1916, she was obliged to resign the position of organizer and lecturer of the National WCTU because of serious illness which permanently affected her health.

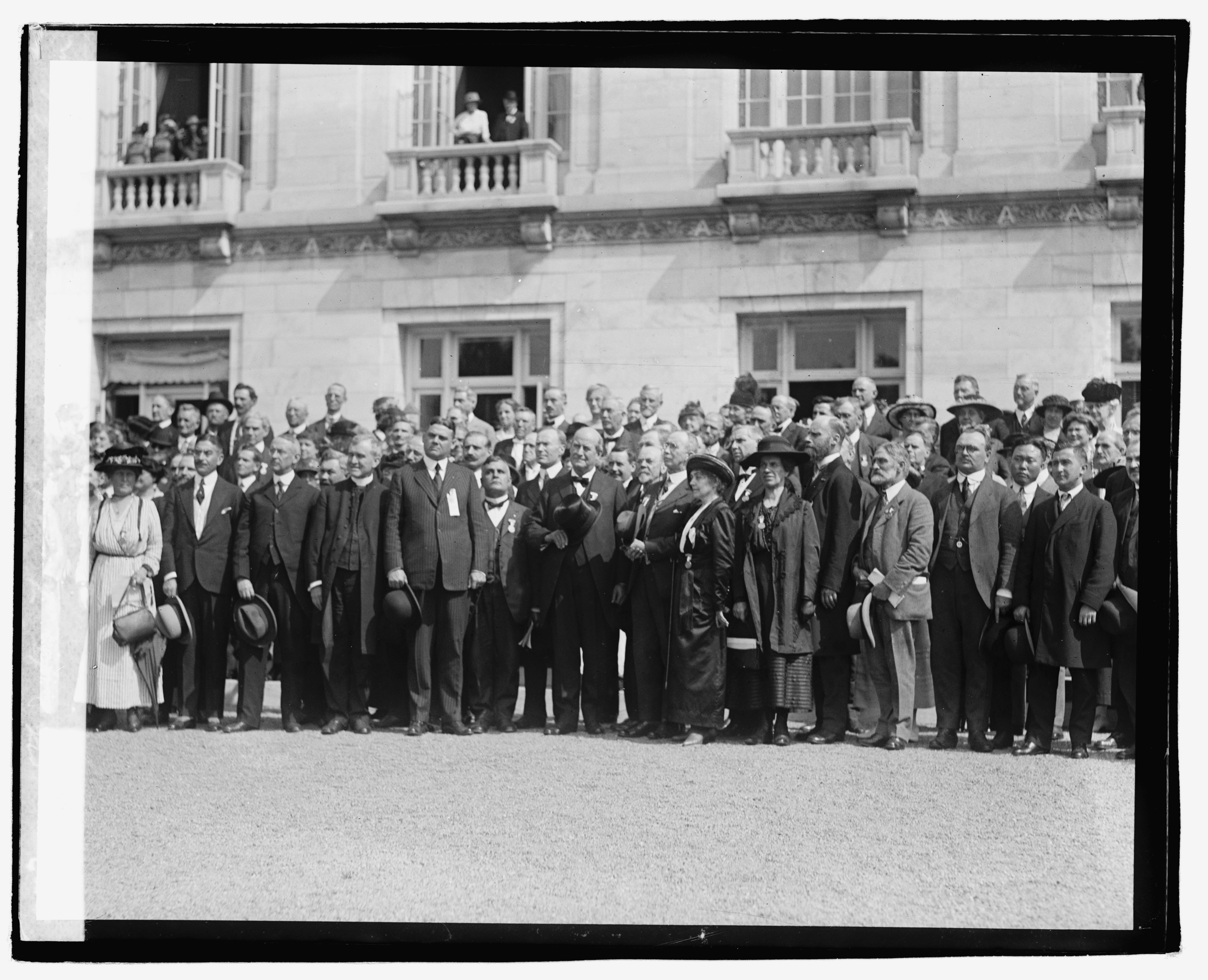
15th International Congress Against Alcoholism, September 1920

She was a member of the American Executive Committee, appointed by the U.S. Department of State to arrange for the Fifteenth International Congress, which was held at Washington, September 21–20, 1920. Blaine was the author of the pageant dedicated to the foreign nations represented at the Congress. Blain presented different tableaus involving the eras of American history and presented through living prototypes people whose lives illuminated American history. These included scenes to appeal strongly to the American spirit, such as that showing General Washington with makers of the Constitution and continental advisers in attendance. This pageant, entitled "The Spirit of Temperance", was written and presented by Blaine, with professional assistance in its direction, at the east front of the Capitol on the first evening of the Congress. She was long noted for her unusual ability in employing music and drama in the presentation of temperance messages, having written numerous songs and exercises for children and young people, which she has presented in connection with her work in Washington and in the field.

Another feature of her work was the organization of temperance mass-meetings of Sunday-school children, usually preceded by a formal parade. The largest of these was held in Washington in May, 1913, when 3,000 children marched in the parade and three auditoriums were used simultaneously for the mass-meetings, which were addressed by Secretary of the Navy the Hon. Josephus Daniels and by Blaine who gave an illustrated talk, assisted by children in costume.

== Personal life ==
She died at Romulus, New York, May 15, 1932.

== Selected works ==
- "Columbia's Congress", 1911
- "The Evolution of the Temperance Reform; demonstration for boys and girls", 1917
- "The Spirit of Temperance", 1920
