= Suessa =

Suessa may refer to:

== Geography ==
- Sessa Aurunca, town and comune in the province of Caserta, Campania, southern Italy
- Suessa Pometia, ancient city of Latium

== People ==
- Suessa Baldridge Blaine (1860-1932), American writer of temperance pageants
- Taddeo da Suessa (c. 1190/1200 – 1248), Italian jurist
