= Simon Ritter Cobblestone Farmhouse =

Historic house in New York, United States

- U.S. National Register of Historic Places
- Location within New York Location within the United States
- Location: 5102 NY Rt. 89, Varick, New York
- Coordinates: 42°46′39″N 76°46′11″W
- Area: 144 acres (58 ha)
- Built: 1830
- Architectural style: Greek Revival
- MPS: Cobblestone Architecture of New York State MPS
- NRHP reference No.: 08001081
- Added to NRHP: November 18, 2008

Simon Ritter Cobblestone Farmhouse is a historic house located at Varick in Seneca County, New York. It is a late Federal / early Greek Revival style, cobblestone farmhouse with an overlay of Italianate detailing. It is a two-story, slightly asymmetrical structure, on a raised fieldstone foundation. It was built about 1830 and is constructed of irregularly sized and variously colored field cobbles. The house is among the approximately 18 surviving cobblestone buildings in Seneca County. Also on the property are two large early / mid 19th century barns, a carriage house and machine shed, a boathouse built about 1900 on the shore of Cayuga Lake, and a limestone carriage stepping stone.

It was listed on the National Register of Historic Places in 2008. The owners operate Varick Winery, which has a tasting room on another part of the property.
