= East Varick, New York =

Hamlet in New York, United States

Coordinates: 42°46′12″N 76°46′09″W

East Varick is a hamlet in the Town of Varick, Seneca County, New York, United States, along Cayuga Lake. It is located four miles (6 km) east of the hamlet of Romulus, at an elevation of 400 feet (122 m). The primary intersection within the vicinity of the hamlet is at N.Y. Route 89 and Ernsberger Road (CR 128).
