= Willards =

Willards may refer to:

== In organizations ==
- Members of the Lincoln-Lee Legion, an early 20th-century temperance group

== In places ==
- Willards, Maryland, a town in the United States
- Willards, a former Los Angeles chicken restaurant that Cecil B. DeMille and partners bought in 1940 and converted to the Los Feliz Brown Derby

== See also ==
- Willard (disambiguation)
