= Seneca Township, Ohio =

Seneca Township, Ohio may refer to:

- Seneca Township, Monroe County, Ohio
- Seneca Township, Noble County, Ohio
- Seneca Township, Seneca County, Ohio

== See also ==
- Seneca Township (disambiguation)
