= Romulus Central School District =

School district in New York, United States

Address
- 5705 Route 96 Romulus, New York, 14541; United States

District information
- Type: Public
- Grades: PreK–12
- NCES District ID: 3624930

Students and staff
- Students: 435 (2020–2021)
- Teachers: 45.0 (on an FTE basis)
- Staff: 51.0 (on an FTE basis)
- Student–teacher ratio: 9.67:1

Other information
- Website: romuluscsd.org

The Romulus Central School District is a public school district in New York State that serves approximately 600 students in 88 square miles (230 km^{2}) in the towns of Romulus, Fayette, MacDougal, East Varick and West Varick in Seneca County with a staff of 100 and a budget of $8 million ($13171 per student).

The average class size is 17 students (elementary), 23 students (secondary). The student-teacher ratio is 11:1.

The district motto is "the small school with a BIG idea".

Jennifer Ann Hayden is the superintendent of schools.

== History ==
In 1937, a public vote formed Romulus Central School, consolidating more than 12 one-room schoolhouses.

== Board of education ==
The Board of Education (BOE) consists of 7 members, who serve rotating 3-year terms, and a district clerk. Elections are held each May for board members and to vote on the School District Budget.

Current board members (January 2012) are:

- Robert McCann - President
- Seth Brandow - Vice President
- Rachelle Fletcher
- Rebecca Jessop
- Kara Mapstone
- Timothy Wiant
- Jennifer Yuhas
- Suzanne M. Nicholson - District Clerk

== Schools ==
The district operates one school building, combining a PreK-6 elementary school with a 7-12 secondary school in Romulus, New York. The principal is Christopher Puylara.

=== Elementary schools ===
- Romulus Central School (PreK-6)

=== Secondary schools ===
- Romulus Central School (7-12)

== Performance ==
The district's 95% graduation rate exceeds the State Standard of 55%.
