= White deer =

White deer or White Deer may refer to:

== Animals ==
- Seneca white deer
- White stag, a red deer with leucism
- An albino deer of any species

== Places ==
- White Deer, Texas, United States
- White Deer Creek, in Pennsylvania, United States
- White Deer Township, Pennsylvania, United States

== Other uses ==
- The White Deer, a children's novel by James Thurber
- Bijeli jelen / "White Deer" (1947) by Vladimir Nazor

== See also ==
- White Hart
