= Willard Drug Treatment Center =

Specialized state prison, located in New York, US

Coordinates: 42.682230°N 76.868763°W

Willard Drug Treatment Campus
- Interactive map of Willard Drug Treatment Campus
- Location: 7116 County Road 132 Willard, New York
- Status: closed
- Security class: medium specialty (drug treatment)
- Capacity: 900
- Opened: 1995
- Closed: 2022
- Managed by: New York State Department of Corrections and Community Supervision

Willard Drug Treatment Campus was a specialized state prison in Seneca County, New York, United States. The prison focused on treatment of drug-addicted convicts. Willard Drug Treatment Campus was located in Willard, a community in the Town of Romulus and is adjacent to Seneca Lake in the Finger Lakes Region.

Willard was a 900-bed intensive "boot-camp" style drug treatment campus for men and women. This voluntary 97-day treatment program provided a sentencing option for individuals convicted of a drug offense and parole violators who otherwise would have been returned to a state prison, and in most cases, for a year or more. The facility was operated by the New York State Department of Corrections and Community Supervision in conjunction with the Division of Parole and was licensed by the state Office of Alcoholism and Substance Abuse Services (OASAS).

== History ==
The drug treatment campus was opened in 1995 on the site of the former Willard Psychiatric State Hospital, a facility for mental patients. The facility closed in March of 2022 as part of budget costs and sensible population relocation efforts.

The Paranormal Research Society, headquartered at Pennsylvania State University, investigated the drug treatment campus and featured it on a season one episode of Paranormal State titled "The Asylum."
