= Senec =

Senec may refer to:

== Places ==
- Senec District, Bratislava Region, western Slovakia
  - Senec, Slovakia, capital of Senec District
- Senec (Rakovník District), a village in the Central Bohemian Region, Czech Republic
- Zruč-Senec, a village in Plzeň Region, Czech Republic

== Sports ==
- FC Senec, a football club based in Senec, Slovakia, active 1994–2008
- ŠK Senec, a football club based in Senec, Slovakia, active 1994–2016
- MŠK Senec, a football club based in Senec, Slovakia, active 2014–present

== Other uses ==
- Senec, a German solar storage manufacturer; subsidiary of EnBW

== See also ==
- Seneca (disambiguation)
