= Sampson State Park =

State park located in Seneca County, New York

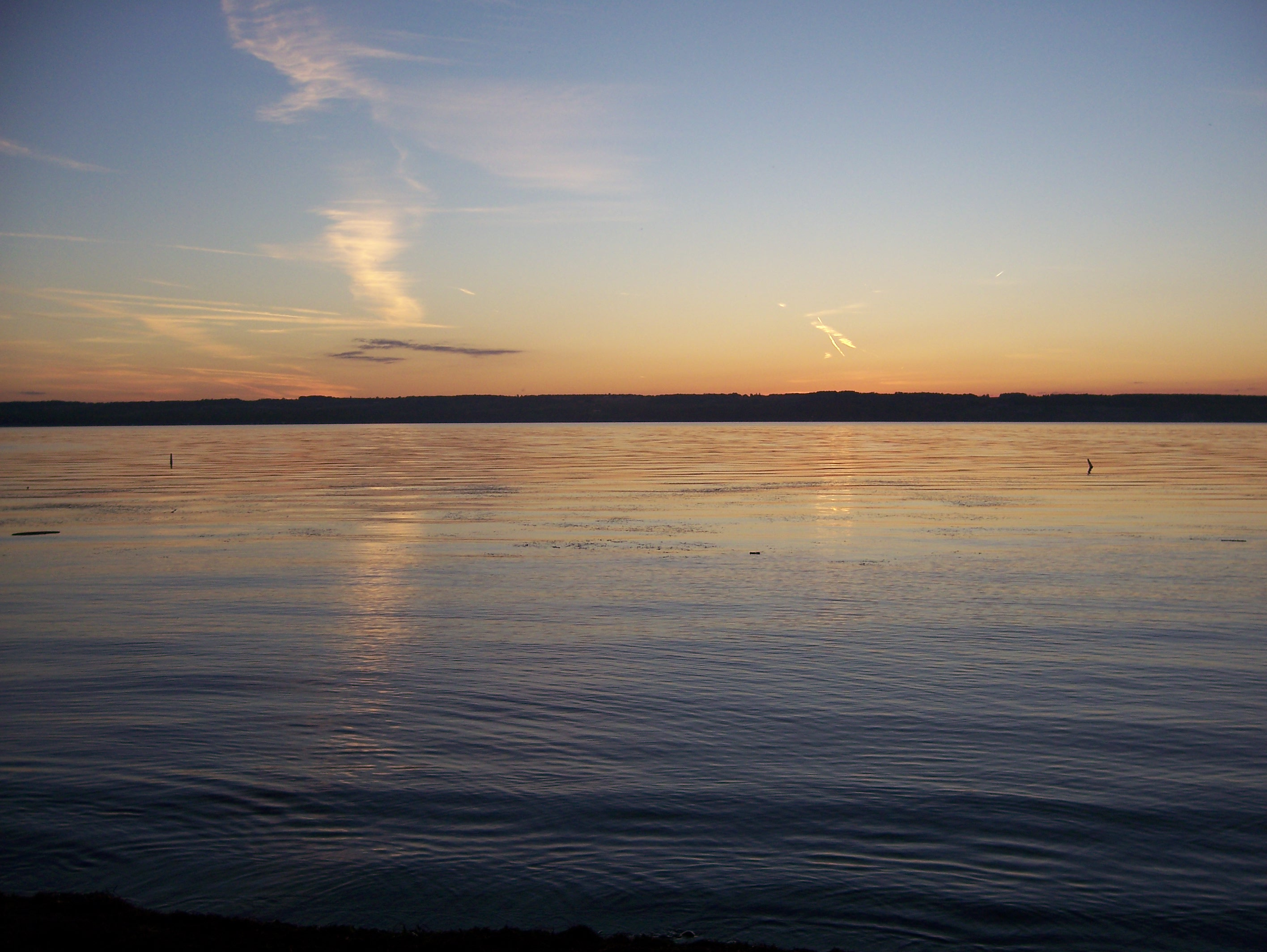
- Seneca Lake from Sampson State Park

- Location within New York
- Type: State park
- Location: 6096 Route 96A; Romulus, New York
- Coordinates: 42°44′10″N 76°54′29″W
- Area: 2,070 acres (8.4 km^{2})
- Created: 1960
- Operator: New York State Office of Parks, Recreation and Historic Preservation
- Visitors: 166,043 (in 2014)
- Open: All year
- Camp sites: 309 (245 electric)
- Website: Sampson State Park

Sampson State Park (along with Sampson State Park Beach) is a 2,070-acre (8.4 km^{2}) state park located in Seneca County, New York. The park is south of the city of Geneva in the Town of Romulus on the east shore of Seneca Lake, one of the Finger Lakes.

The park is located on the site of the former Sampson Naval Training Station, which later became the Sampson Air Force Base.

== History ==
During World War II, the site was the location of the Sampson Naval Training Station; during the Korean War, it became the Sampson Air Force Base, again providing basic training. It is also located next to the former Seneca Army Depot, a munitions storage site. Most buildings are gone leaving a network of 38 miles (61 km) of once-paved roads and trails in a wooded three-square-mile (7.8 km^{2}) area. The surviving building housing the "brig" today hosts a museum featuring displays that depict the activities and lives of the hundreds of thousands of Navy and Air Force personnel as they trained to go to war at Sampson.

After the United States declared the site as surplus, it was purchased in 1960 by the New York State Council of Parks for $500,000.

Both the state park and the former naval training station are named after Rear Admiral William T. Sampson, who was born in nearby Palmyra.

== Park facilities ==
Sampson State Park includes a military museum, a campground with 309 campsites, a sandy beach on Seneca Lake, boat launches, and a marina with over 100 boat slips.

=== Military Museum ===
The park is home to a museum run by volunteer Air Force and Navy veterans. The museum holds many artifacts and displays that were around when Sampson was a military base. The hours of the museum are dependent on volunteer support, but is usually open on the weekend.

== See also ==
- List of New York state parks
