= LORAN-C transmitter Seneca =

Coordinates: 42°42′50.60″N 76°49′33.86″W

The LORAN-C transmitter Seneca was the master station of the Northeastern United States LORAN-C Chain (GRI 9960) and the X-Ray secondary station of the Great Lakes Chain (GRI 8970). It was located within the Seneca Army Depot in Romulus, New York, south of Geneva. It used a 1000-kilowatt, 742-foot (226.2 m) guyed mast that was constructed in 1977 and dedicated on August 2, 1978. The station was operated by United States Coast Guard and was located on a 250-acre (1.0 km^{2}) piece of land within the 10,587-acre (42.84 km^{2}) facility. The transmitter was used to guide ships and aircraft up to 1,000 miles (1,600 km) away. It was the first LORAN station to use solid-state electronics versus vacuum tube components.

The station, was shut down for good on February 9, 2010 at 3:00 p.m. EST. The tower was dismantled shortly after decommissioning of the LORAN-C system and was stacked in pieces next to the transmitter building awaiting further disposition.
