= Jane Larkworthy =

American beauty editor and journalist (1962–2025)

- Born: Jane Hazen Larkworthy; November 27, 1962; Oceanside, New York, U.S.
- Died: June 4, 2025 (aged 62); New Marlborough, Massachusetts, U.S.
- Education: Ithaca College (B.A., 1984)
- Occupations: Beauty editor, journalist, writer
- Spouse(s): Bertrand Garbassi (m. 2006-2025; her death); 2 children

Jane Hazen Larkworthy (November 27, 1962 – June 4, 2025) was an American beauty editor and journalist. She served as executive beauty director at W magazine and was a prominent voice in print beauty journalism during the 1990s and 2000s.

== Early life and education ==
Larkworthy was born in Oceanside, New York and raised in nearby Merrick, on Long Island. She was the youngest of three children of William Larkworthy, a hospital community relations director, and Marjean “Midge” (née McKay) Larkworthy, a homemaker, freelance writer, and designer. Her mother died of breast cancer on June 4, 1980, when Jane was 17. She earned a bachelor's degree from Ithaca College in 1984.

== Career ==
Larkworthy began her career in the mid‑1980s at Glamour, followed by a position at Mademoiselle. In 1997, she became beauty director of Jane magazine, then later joined W magazine, where she served as executive beauty director from 2000 until 2016.

She contributed as beauty editor-at-large to The Cut and wrote for Air Mail. Her writing was celebrated for its skeptical yet affectionate tone—she described her approach as “weeding out the BS”—and she often paired product insight with dry humor. Memorable lines included: “No one wants to smell like lemon Pledge” and “I wake up with supple skin — and sometimes a craving for Fage.”

Larkworthy also created the cooking blog The Fraudulent Chef and ran a baking-themed Instagram account, @shiksabagels. In her later years, she consulted for beauty brands and became a licensed real estate agent after moving to western Massachusetts during the COVID-19 pandemic.

== Media attention ==
In 2007, Larkworthy testified in the high-profile criminal trial of her former boyfriend, Women’s Wear Daily writer Peter Braunstein. Prosecutors alleged the victim in the case had been targeted as a surrogate for Larkworthy.

In 2020, a resurfaced social media comment by Larkworthy was criticized as racially insensitive, and The Cut suspended her from her editorial role.

== Personal life and death ==
Larkworthy married Bertrand Garbassi in 2006. Larkworthy died from breast cancer at her home in New Marlborough, Massachusetts on June 4, 2025, aged 62. She was survived by her husband, two stepchildren, two stepgrandchildren, and her siblings Kate and Peter.
