= Seneca white deer =

Isolated population in Seneca County, New York

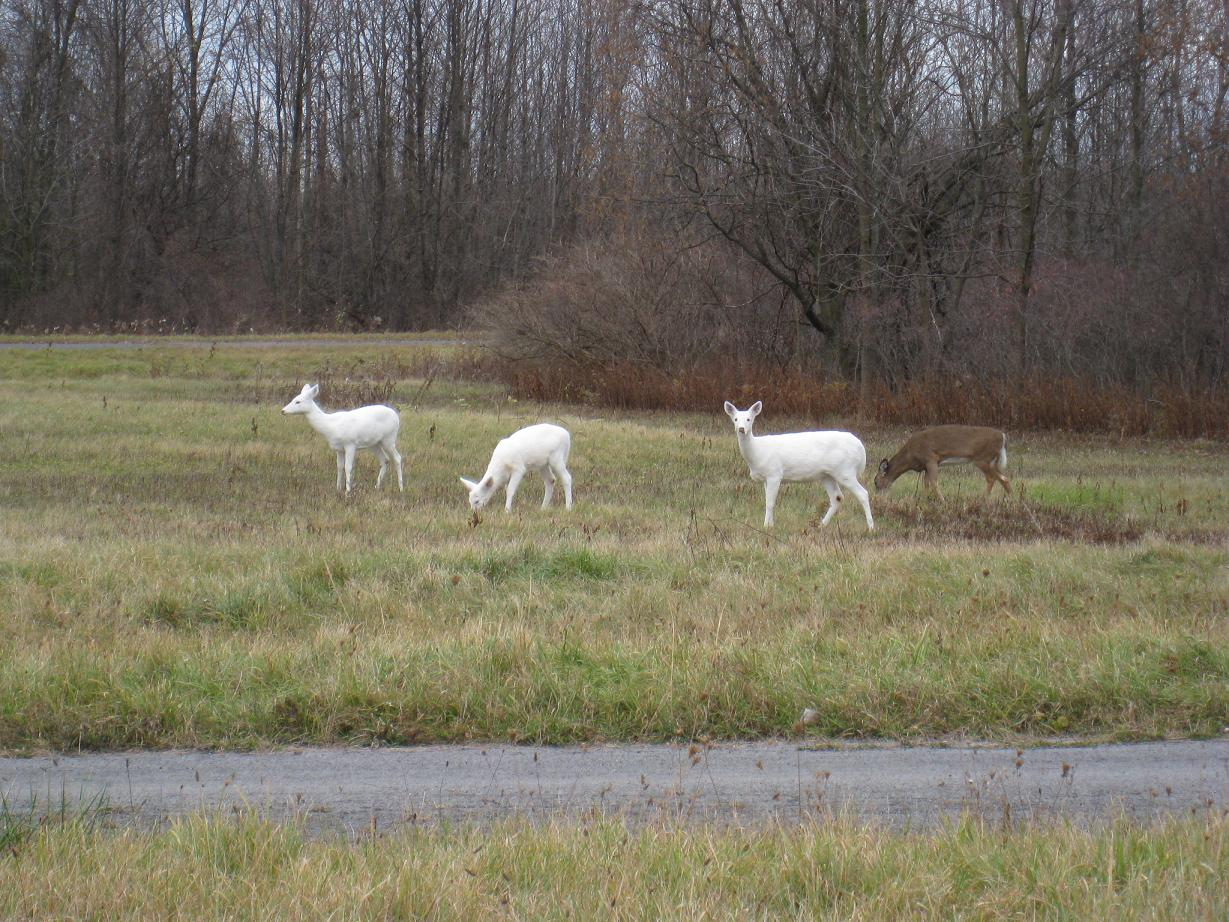
Seneca white deer inside the depot

The Seneca white deer are a rare herd of deer living within the confines of the former Seneca Army Depot in Seneca County, New York. When the 10,600-acre (43 km^{2}) depot was created in 1941, a 24-mile (39 km) fence was erected around its perimeter, isolating a small herd of white-tailed deer (Odocoileus virginianus), some of which had white coats. These deer are not albino, but instead have leucism, which is an abnormal genetic condition that carries a set of recessive genes for all-white coats. While little is known about what caused leucism in the white-tailed deer, especially for this herd, researchers have noticed that its isolation causes high levels of inbreeding. With inbreeding, it leaves recessive alleles of the white-tailed population to be expressed. This recessive trait does not pose a danger to the animal. However, it is very rare.

In the 1950s, the depot commander forbade GIs from shooting any white deer. The deer population has since grown to about 700 head, approximately 300 of which are white, making it the largest herd of white deer in the world. Seneca White Deer were created through years of selective breeding within the depot to create an environment where they can flourish.

== Future of the herd ==
Since the depot's closure in 2000, the future of the deer has been uncertain. The visibility of white deer makes them easy prey for hunters and natural enemies like coyotes, and such a herd would not survive in the wild. The depot land is New York's largest block of land available for development, and some new uses have been found for it. The Five Points maximum security state prison was built on the eastern rim, and the former barracks on the northern tip was converted into housing for troubled teenagers. Plans to buy 4,700 acres (1,900 ha) of land to build an ethanol and biofuel electricity production center and to plant crops of willow trees and switch grass to be converted into fuel was proposed. In 2006, a business plan was submitted to the Seneca County Industrial Development Agency, owners of the depot property, to convert the land into a conservation park and Cold War museum, but the plan was denied.

In 2016, the 7,000 acres (2,800 ha) property was sold to local businessman Earl Martin of Seneca Iron Works for $900,000 and established as Deer Haven Park, LLC. An agreement was later made between Martin and Dennis Money, founder of Seneca White Deer, Inc., to lease part of the land and operate it as a conservation park for the white deer. Following renovations to the fencing and construction of a welcome center and museum, Seneca White Deer park opened for tours in November 2017, ending December 29, 2019. Tours reopened on Saturdays on June 27, 2020, as self-guided auto tours with the option to download an auto tour app. The current plans for the depot are to preserve the approximately 200 deer left through strategic investment and innovation.

== See also ==
- White stag
