= Kendaia =

Seneca and Cayuga village in present-day Romulus, New York, U.S.

Kendaia, known as Appletown, was a village of the Seneca and Cayuga Nations of Haudenosaunee located in what is now the town of Romulus, New York. The name has been variously transcribed into English as Thendara, Candaia, Conday, or Kendae. The site of the village on the east side of Seneca Lake is included in the present-day Sampson State Park.

"Kendaia was occupied either for an extended period of time or multiple times," since a large number of Jesuit artifacts were found dating from the early 1700s.

The Seneca war chief Tah-won-ne-ahs, known as Chainbreaker, was born in Kendaia somewhere between 1737 and 1760.

During the American Revolution the Sullivan Expedition of 1779 found the village to be the "oldest town we have passed, here being a considerable orchard, trees very old as are the buildings, very pleasantly situated about a quarter of a mile from the lake on a high piece of ground." The village consisted of "twenty or more houses of hewn logs, covered with bark, and some of them were well painted. Here was one apple orchard of sixty trees, besides others; also peach trees and other fruits... About this town, the showy tombs erected over some of their chiefs, were most noticeable, one of which, larger and more conspicuous than the others, is described by one of the journals as a casement or box made of hewn planks, about four feet high and somewhat larger than the body over which it was placed, and which was appropriately dressed. This casement was painted with bright colors, and had openings through which the body could be seen, and was covered with a roof to protect it from the weather." As part of his scorched earth policy Sullivan spent a day burning the houses and destroying the corn and the fruit trees. Sullivan also discovered and freed a captive taken in the Battle of Wyoming, Luke Swetland, who informed him that the village's inhabitants had all fled to the protection of the British at Fort Niagara two days earlier to escape the advance of the Americans.

As of 2015, the hamlet of Kendaia in Seneca County is located a few miles from where the Seneca village stood.
