= Willie Bosket =

American murderer

- Born: William James Bosket Jr. December 9, 1962 (age 63); Harlem, New York City, New York, United States
- Convictions: Murder (2 counts); Arson; Escape; Assault (3 counts); Attempted assault
- Penalty: 82 years to life

William James Bosket Jr. (born December 9, 1962) is an American convicted murderer, whose numerous crimes committed while he was still a minor led to a change in New York state law, so that juveniles as young as 13 could be tried as an adult for murder and would face the same penalties. He has been in either prison or reformatories for all but 18 months since 1971, and has spent all but 100 days of his adult life in custody. He is currently serving a sentence of 82 years to life at Wende Correctional Facility.

== Early life ==
Bosket was born in Harlem. His father, Willie Sr. (Butch), killed Dave Hurwitz and William Locke at a Milwaukee pawn shop on July 20, 1962, shortly after his son was conceived. He was sentenced to life in prison for the crime and later earned a degree in computer science and psychology while incarcerated. Butch was released from prison and went on to get a job as a computer programmer for an aerospace company but was charged with a crime. He shot his girlfriend and committed suicide to avoid being caught.

Bosket had a traumatic childhood. When his grandfather was released from prison, he raped Willie many times. When he was 9 years old, his grandfather had him perform anal sex to "teach him about girls". His mother, Laura, had different live-in boyfriends who beat her and, as a boy, Bosket often jumped in to defend her, in one incident hitting a man with a pipe and slashing him with a knife and in another threatening "I'm going to burn that motherfucker up". He also suffered a head injury when he ran out into the street, and was hit by a car. This was all before he was ten years old.

When he was nine years old, his mother, heeding advice, petitioned he be placed in a center, stating he was "a person in need of supervision". He was placed at The Children's Center in Manhattan, but escaped and quickly ended up at Spofford which was a "secure detention center" and a child's equivalent to an adult doing time in Attica State Prison. He would be in and out of detention centers and reformatories except for a short time when he turned 21 and had served out his time for murder.

His mother had told him "Don't be bullied... Hit back. To get respect, you've got to be the toughest." In the different centers, he developed a reputation for violence, upon which he prided himself. He told juvenile authorities that one day he would be a killer, just like his father.

== Subway murders and fallout ==
On March 19, 1978, Bosket, then fifteen years old, shot and killed Noel Perez on a train operating on the New York City Subway's 3 train during an attempted robbery near the Harlem–148th Street terminal station. Eight days later, Bosket and another accomplice shot dead another man, Moises Perez (unrelated to his first victim) in another attempted robbery at the back of another 3 train at the 145th Street station, one station south of 148th Street. In between, Bosket and his accomplice shot a New York City Transit employee working in the Lenox Yard adjacent to the Harlem–148th Street station and committed two other armed robberies, one of them on the A service.

Bosket was tried for the murders in New York City's family court. As the trial was underway, Bosket surprised his own lawyer by pleading guilty to both murders. He was sentenced to a maximum of five years in the Goshen Youth Facility. Prosecutors sought a longer sentence, but were limited by sentencing guidelines for minors that were in place at that time.

== Significance ==
The short length of Bosket's sentence caused a public outcry. Governor Hugh Carey had opposed efforts by his opponent in that year's gubernatorial election, State Assembly Minority Leader Perry Duryea, to have juveniles tried as adults for certain crimes. However, after reading a report on Bosket's sentence, Carey called the state legislature into special session to pass the Juvenile Offender Act of 1978. Under this act, children as young as thirteen years old could be tried in an adult court for crimes such as murder, and receive the same penalties as adults. New York was the first state to enact a law of this nature; all of the other states have since followed suit. Because it was Willie Bosket's case that was used to push laws allowing juveniles to be tried as adults, it is sometimes referred to as the Willie Bosket Law.

== Subsequent crimes ==
A year after he began serving his sentence for the two murders, Bosket escaped from the youth facility. He was caught after two hours, tried as an adult for the escape and sentenced to four years in state prison. He was returned to the Division of Youth in 1979, and was released in 1983. After 100 days he was arrested when a man living in his apartment complex claimed Bosket had robbed and assaulted him. Then while awaiting trial on that crime, Bosket assaulted several court officers. He was found guilty of attempted assault for the dispute in the apartment and sentenced to seven years in prison.

At this point, his escape from the youth facility nearly came back to haunt him. He was 16 years old at the time, meaning he was now considered an adult for criminal purposes. In New York, escaping from a correctional facility is a felony, even if the facility is a youth facility. If he had been convicted of assaulting the court officers, it would have been his third felony conviction. Under New York's habitual offender law, he was facing an automatic sentence of 25 years to life. However, he was acquitted.

Convinced that he would die in prison, Bosket took out his rage on correction officers, getting into numerous altercations. Arrested for one of those incidents, he was convicted of assault and arson, and sentenced to 25 years to life. In 1989, he was sentenced to an additional 25-years-to-life sentence for stabbing corrections officer Earl Porter at the maximum-security Shawangunk Correctional Facility. After the 1988 assault, Bosket was transferred to Woodbourne Correctional Facility, where in April 1989 he drew a third 25-years-to-life sentence for assaulting a correction officer with a chain. All three sentences are consecutive. His earliest possible release date is September 16, 2062, when he will be 99 years old.

Since his conviction for the 1989 assault, Bosket (NYSDOCS inmate number 84A6391) has been housed in solitary confinement. While at Woodbourne, nominally a medium-security prison, Bosket was housed in a specially-built plexiglass-lined cell stripped of everything but a cot and a sink/toilet combination, with four video cameras watching him at all times. He was only allowed out of his cell for one hour a day, apart from medical visits and haircuts. Although he was allowed visitors, they could only speak to him through a window in his cell.

Bosket once declared "war" on a prison system that he claimed made him a "monster," and was cited for almost 250 disciplinary violations from 1985 to 1994. However, he has not had a disciplinary violation since 1994. According to a 2008 report in The New York Times, due to his numerous incidents of violence during the 1980s and 1990s, he was initially not slated to move into the general population until 2046, when he will be 84 years old. Department spokesman Erik Kriss told the Times, "This guy was violent or threatening violence every day. Granted, it has been a while, but there are consequences for being violent in prison. We have zero tolerance for that."

He was later transferred to Five Points Correctional Facility, a maximum-security prison. Although he is still in solitary confinement, he is evaluated periodically, and due to his clean disciplinary record in recent years may join the general population sooner than 2046. By December 2022, Bosket had been transferred to Wende, another maximum-security facility.

In 1995, New York Times reporter Fox Butterfield wrote All God's Children: The Bosket Family and the American Tradition of Violence, an examination of the escalating violence and criminality in succeeding generations of the Bosket family where he described Willie Bosket's life as marred in violence and dysfunction from its beginning.
