= Peter Braunstein =

American former journalist, writer and playwright

- Born: January 26, 1964 (age 62); New York City, U.S.
- Other names: "Halloween rapist", "fake firefighter", "fire fiend"
- Occupations: Fashion journalist, writer, playwright
- Parent(s): Alberto, Angele
- Criminal charges: Sexual abuse, arson, kidnapping, robbery
- Penalty: 18-years-to-life

Peter Braunstein (born January 26, 1964) is an American former journalist, writer and playwright who became infamous for committing an October 31, 2005, rape and leading police on a multi-state manhunt until his capture and self-injury in Memphis, Tennessee on December 16, 2005.

Dubbed the "Halloween rapist", the "fake firefighter", "fire fiend", and other names by the media, Braunstein became the most wanted man in New York City, a dubious honor often reserved for murderers, mobsters, or terrorists. Braunstein formerly worked as a writer for Women's Wear Daily and The Village Voice, and his former colleagues avidly followed the case on blogs.

His trial in May 2007 drew a lot of media attention. It lasted four weeks, during which the victim testified at length about the attack, a former girlfriend testified about their relationship, and excerpts from Braunstein's journal were read into the record. Defense lawyers tried to argue diminished capacity, claiming Braunstein suffered an organic brain disorder with effects similar to paranoid schizophrenia that made him delusional and incapable of intent. The jury was not convinced and convicted him of 10 counts of kidnapping, burglary, robbery and sexual abuse, though he was acquitted on the charge of arson. He is currently serving his 18-year-to-life sentence at Five Points Correctional Facility; he has been eligible for parole since 2023, but remains in custody.

== Biography ==
Peter Braunstein was born to Alberto and Angele Braunstein in Kew Gardens, Queens, New York City. His father was a Manhattan gallery owner. Braunstein studied abroad at Sorbonne in Paris and is fluent in French. He came back to New York to pursue a PhD in history from NYU.

In 2000, he got a job at W, writing mostly about the history and culture of rock music. He also freelanced for the publications mentioned above. He began dating his coworker, W beauty editor Jane Larkworthy. After breaking up with her, Braunstein started using the magazine's website as a blog to harass his ex-girlfriend, whom he referred to as "BioHazard". He was charged with 37 counts of harassment, pleaded guilty, and was sentenced to three years probation.

According to the victim, Braunstein harassed her for 18 months, taped her hands to a chair, sent frightening emails and phone messages to her coworkers and family, and posted her naked photos and personal information on an adult web site. On November 22, 2004, Braunstein cut his own chest with a knife and then claimed his ex-girlfriend attacked him. He was taken by the police to Bellevue Hospital for a psychiatric evaluation and released after two hours. Various parsings of these events had him suffering from what could be described as delusions of grandeur and paranoia.

He went back to live with his mother in Queens, which earned him the nickname "George Costanza" among his associates. In 2004, he wrote the off-off-Broadway play Andy & Edie about the relationship between Andy Warhol and Edie Sedgwick. Although it played to full houses at the relatively small Shetler Studio Theater, the piece wasn't well received by some critics. Braunstein stopped talking to his father after he made a negative comment about the play.

Braunstein also came up with a hit list of "gay men" whom he wanted to "punish".

== Halloween attack ==
On October 31, 2005, a man wearing a New York City Fire Department uniform set off two smoke bombs in the lobby of a West 24th street building in Chelsea, Manhattan where his victim lived. He then knocked on the door of the victim's apartment and told her he was there to check for smoke damage. As soon as the victim let him in, the man shoved a chloroform-laced rag into her face. For the next 13 hours, she went in and out of consciousness while the attacker groped her. The victim told the police that the attacker apparently knew her, although she was not able to identify him. According to her, he videotaped the attack and left with a pair of her shoes.

The police released a sketch of the suspect made with the help of a witness which was identified as Braunstein by his father the next day. Several of his former coworkers also called the police after he allegedly made threatening phone calls to them following the attack. Several days later, detectives uncovered more evidence on Braunstein's personal computer, including a detailed plan that described the attack that occurred. Police have also discovered that Braunstein purchased a voice-altering device on eBay five days before the attack.

=== Media reaction ===
The crime received a great amount of media attention for a number of reasons - one is that Braunstein was a well-educated writer and journalist from an upper-middle-class family. Braunstein also was able to avoid arrest for several weeks while apparently still residing in New York, where his photo graced the front pages of most newspapers and footage of the suspect was played on the evening news almost daily. Finally, the timing also coincided with a historic low for NYC crime rates.

The crime quickly became a sensation in the New York area. New developments about the crime were often featured on the front pages of tabloids like the New York Post and New York Daily News, as well as the TV show America's Most Wanted. It was revealed that the suspect had an interest in pornography and was "extremely intelligent and talented, with an IQ of 185". This "evil genius" aspect of the crime only fueled the public fascination with it. Other details uncovered by the media included the fact that Braunstein was contemplating stalking supermodel Kate Moss.

He has also been followed in great detail by gossip blogs such as Gawker, with the editor Jessica Coen going as far as creating a special section to document her findings. Even Craigslist had a hand in the story, as lengthy, elaborate posts from an anonymous source speculated about his whereabouts.

=== Manhunt and capture ===
On November 17, 2005, Braunstein was spotted at a local Cobble Hill coffee shop in Brooklyn. The shop's owner recognized the suspect and alerted two policemen nearby. The blocks surrounding the area were quickly filled with dozens of police officers, some wearing riot gear, as well as the news media. Around 1:30 p.m., a police bloodhound who had been given a pillow recovered at the scene of the sexual assault picked up a scent and tracked it two blocks to an abandoned building. Police forces stormed the building but found no evidence of the suspect. Throughout the day, posters were hung up in the area offering a reward of $12,000 for information leading to the capture of Braunstein.

He was captured on December 16, 2005, in Memphis, Tennessee, around 3:30 p.m. A University of Memphis student saw him and notified police. As the police moved in, he reportedly shouted, "I am the man the world is looking for" (although other sources have reported slightly different accounts of his words). Braunstein then stabbed himself thirteen times in the neck yet survived the suicide attempt. After recovery from surgery, he was transferred to New York custody and on December 23, 2005, a grand jury indicted him for the Halloween attack; he was arraigned on January 5, 2006, and pleaded not guilty to charges of sexual abuse, arson, kidnapping, burglary, and robbery.

On Christmas Day, the New York Post reported that Braunstein had been working at Xavier High School, a prominent New York all-boys private school. His employment was mere archiving work and had no direct contact with any students. The day before the attack, he told the school he was leaving for "an extended writing assignment". The day after the attack, he returned to Xavier to cash a paycheck. English teacher and rugby coach Mike Tolkin said that Braunstein "kept to himself". The day before the article was run, Xavier parents received letters from the school telling them of Braunstein's employment and explained that there was no need for any concern.

== Trial ==
Braunstein's trial in June 2007 in State Supreme Court in Manhattan was covered closely by the New York media. His victim testified at length about the assault, and Larkworthy recalled on the stand how Braunstein had played out elements of the crime when the two were together. Prosecutors disclosed Braunstein's personal manifesto, written in the months before the crime, in which he said that God had intended him for the purpose of working justice upon those who sinned. The jury was ultimately allowed to hear only an excerpt in which he pondered killing Vogue editor Anna Wintour. "She will be escorted by eunuchs to a place in hell run by large rats", he declared. He recounted how she had, unlike other prominent fashion editors, never deigned to speak to him on the phone. He also ranted about Sex and the City creator Darren Star and Larkworthy.

His defense tried to argue that he had a brain dysfunction that left him unable to distinguish fantasy and reality, that during the assault he had been living in the former. His lawyers put a psychologist on the stand as an expert witness, and tried to show when cross-examining Larkworthy that he was displaying similar symptoms even then. The jury convicted Braunstein of kidnapping, sexual abuse (known as sexual assault in some other jurisdictions), robbery, and several other felonies on May 23, 2007 (but acquitting him of arson since they found he had not set the fire to cause damage to the building, only as a diversion). The panel deliberated less than four hours. On June 18, 2007, Braunstein was sentenced to 18 years to life in prison.

== In popular culture ==
- This case was the inspiration for episode 19 of the 6th season of the CBS show CSI: Crime Scene Investigation titled I Like to Watch, which aired March 9, 2006. In this episode, a serial rapist poses as a firefighter, setting small blazes to gain entry to apartments, where he drugs women and sexually assaults them, focusing mainly on their feet. At the episode's close, the rapist is captured by real firefighters who notice that the rapists turnout gear is different than their own.
- An episode of I (Almost) Got Away with It featured the Braunstein case and his time on the run in the weeks following. Braunstein cooperated for the program and his comments provided insight into his thinking at the time of his crimes and the manhunt. In this episode, Peter Braunstein himself is recorded on camera stating, "If you released me tomorrow, the only thing- I'd get a big steak dinner, and then I would continue right where I left off."
- Braunstein's case also inspired a subplot in the comic book Ex Machina.
