= Romulus (CDP), New York =

Romulus, New York
- Hamlet and CDP
- Location within the state of New York
- Coordinates: 42°45′06″N 76°50′06″W
- Country: United States
- State: New York
- County: Seneca
- Town: Romulus

Area
  - Total: 0.61 sq mi (1.58 km^{2})
  - Land: 0.61 sq mi (1.58 km^{2})
  - Water: 0 sq mi (0.00 km^{2})
- Elevation: 719 ft (219 m)

Population (2020)
  - Total: 356
  - Density: 584.9/sq mi (225.85/km^{2})
- Time zone: UTC-5 (Eastern (EST))
  - Summer (DST): UTC-4 (EDT)
- ZIP code: 14541
- Area code: 607
- FIPS code: 36-63429
- GNIS feature ID: 2628183

Romulus is a hamlet (and census-designated place) in the Town of Romulus, Seneca County, New York, on the border with the Town of Varick. The population was 409 at the 2010 census.

The hamlet was originally called "Romulusville." It was renamed Romulus, after the town, circa 1870.

== Geography ==
Romulus is located at 42°45′06″N 76°50′06″W.

According to the United States Census Bureau, the CDP has a total area of 0.6 square miles (1.6 km^{2}), all of it land.

The primary intersection in the hamlet is at N.Y. Route 96, Cayuga Street (CR 148) and Seneca Street (CR 135). Romulus is adjacent to the former Seneca Army Depot.

== Demographics ==
Historical population
Census	Pop.	Note	%±
2020	356		—
U.S. Decennial Census

As of the census of 2010, there were 409 people, 152 households, and 100 families residing in the CDP. The population density was 681.7 people per square mile (263.2 people/km^{2}). The racial makeup of the CDP was 94.9% White, 2.0% Black or African American, 0.5% Native American, 0.0% Asian, 0.0% Pacific Islander, 0.2% from other races, and 2.4% from two or more races. Hispanic or Latino of any race were 2.4% of the population.

There were 152 households, out of which 29.6% had children under the age of 18 living with them, 46.1% were married couples living together, 11.8% had a female householder with no husband present, and 34.2% were non-families. 28.3% of all households were made up of individuals, and 11.1% had someone living alone who was 65 years of age or older. The average household size was 2.64 and the average family size was 3.18.

In the CDP, the population was spread out, with 29.1% under the age of 20, 4.9% from 20 to 24, 24.7% from 25 to 44, 28.8% from 45 to 64, and 12.5% who were 65 years of age or older. The median age was 37.8 years. For every 100 females, there were 96.6 males. For every 100 females age 18 and over, there were 89.9 males.

The median income for a household in the CDP was $49,583, and the median income for a family was $48,917. Males had a median income of $22,188 versus $22,241 for females. The per capita income for the CDP was $17,521. About 8.2% of families and 17.1% of the population were below the poverty line, including 25.7% of those under age 18 and 0.0% of those age 65 or over.

=== Housing ===
There were 170 housing units at an average density of 283.3 per square mile (109.4/km^{2}). 10.6% of housing units were vacant.

There were 152 occupied housing units in the CDP. 111 were owner-occupied units (73.0%), while 41 were renter-occupied (27.0%). The homeowner vacancy rate was 5.9% of total units. The rental unit vacancy rate was 12.5%.
