= Justice Willard =

Justice Willard may refer to:

- John Willard (judge) (1792–1862), justice of the New York Supreme Court, and ex officio an associate judge of the New York Court of Appeals
- Ammiel J. Willard (1822–1900), associate justice and Chief Justice on the South Carolina Supreme Court
