= Seneca High School =

Seneca High School may refer to various high schools in the United States:

- Seneca High School (Illinois), Seneca, Illinois
- Seneca High School MCA in Louisville, Kentucky
- Seneca High School (New Jersey), Tabernacle Township, New Jersey
- Seneca Vocational High School, Buffalo, New York, U.S., closed in 2006
- Seneca High School (Pennsylvania), Erie, Pennsylvania
- Seneca High School (Missouri), Seneca, Missouri
- Seneca High School (South Carolina), Seneca, South Carolina

== See also ==
- Seneca East High School, Attica, Ohio
