= Seneca Army Airfield =

Former US Army airport in Seneca County, NY, US

Coordinates: 42°42′55.00″N 76°52′56.01″W

Seneca Army Airfield is a closed facility of the United States Army that was originally built as the operational field for Sampson Air Force Base around 1953. Following the closure of the base, the field was turned over to the Army and became part of the nearby Seneca Army Depot. During this time, it was loosely controlled by the Army, as patrols reported seeing civilian aircraft on the runways. Around 1965, the airport reverted to civilian control, although this period was brief and it was converted back to military control soon after. The airport closed by 2000, when the nearby depot closed due to recommendations from the 1995 Base Realignment and Closure Commission.
