= Seneca, Wisconsin =

Seneca is the name of some places in the U.S. state of Wisconsin:

- Seneca, Crawford County, Wisconsin, a town
- Seneca (community), Crawford County, Wisconsin, an unincorporated community
- Seneca, Green Lake County, Wisconsin, a town
- Seneca, Shawano County, Wisconsin, a town
- Seneca, Wood County, Wisconsin, a town
