= Seneca (name) =

Seneca is a given name and an Italian surname which may refer to:

== Given name ==
- Seneca Lassiter (born 1977), American former middle-distance runner
- Seneca M. Dorr (1820–1884), American lawyer, judge, politician and President of the Vermont Senate
- Seneca Paige (1788–1856), American-born businessman and political figure in Canada East
- Seneca Ray Stoddard (1844–1917), American landscape photographer
- Seneca Wallace (born 1980), American National Football League quarterback

=== In fiction ===
- Seneca Beaulac, from the American daytime soap opera Ryan's Hope
- Seneca Crane, in The Hunger Games novel by Suzanne Collins and the film adaptation

== Surname ==
- Seneca the Elder (54 BC – 39 AD), Roman orator and writer, father of the Stoic philosopher Seneca
- Seneca the Younger (c. 4 BC – AD 65), Roman Stoic philosopher, statesman, and dramatist
- Isaac Seneca (1874–1945), American football halfback, first Native American selected All-American
- Joe Seneca (1919-1996), American actor and songwriter
- Robert Seneca (died 1931), American politician and merchant
