= Seneca Township =

Seneca Township may refer to:

== Canada ==
- Seneca Township, a historic township in Haldimand County, Ontario

== United States ==
- Seneca Township, McHenry County, Illinois
- Seneca Township, Kossuth County, Iowa, in Kossuth County, Iowa
- Seneca Township, Lenawee County, Michigan
- Seneca Township, Christian County, Missouri, in Christian County, Missouri
- Seneca Township, Newton County, Missouri
- Seneca Township, Monroe County, Ohio
- Seneca Township, Noble County, Ohio
- Seneca Township, Seneca County, Ohio

== See also ==
- Seneca (disambiguation)
