= Varick, New York =

- Town
- Location within the state of New York
- Coordinates: 42°46′26″N 76°51′54″W
- Country: United States
- State: New York
- County: Seneca
- Settled: 1794
- Established: February 6, 1830

Government
  - Type: Town Council
  - Supervisor: Bob Hayssen
  - Clerk: Donna Karlsen
  - Court: Justice Jeff Hogue

Area
  - Total: 45.67 sq mi (118.28 km^{2})
  - Land: 31.99 sq mi (82.86 km^{2})
  - Water: 13.68 sq mi (35.42 km^{2})
- Elevation: 663 ft (202 m)

Population (2020)
  - Total: 1,656
  - Estimate (2022): 1,644
  - Density: 51.7/sq mi (19.98/km^{2})
- Time zone: UTC-5 (Eastern (EST))
  - Summer (DST): UTC-4 (EDT)
- Area codes: 315 and 680
- FIPS code: 36-76958
- GNIS feature ID: 0979578
- Website: https://varickny.gov/

Varick is a town in Seneca County, New York, United States. The population was 1,656 at the 2020 census. The town is named after Richard Varick, an officer in the American Revolution, mayor of New York City, and uncle of the first Town Supervisor, Anthony Dey.

The Town of Varick is located in the central part of the county and is southeast of Geneva.

There is no post office in the Town of Varick. The primary postal district covering the area is Zip Code 14541 for Romulus.

== History ==
The land that is now the Town of Varick was occupied by the Cayuga and Seneca tribes of the Iroquois Confederacy before European settlement. Jesuits made missionary visits from 1656 to 1684.

The Sullivan Expedition of 1779 passed through the town to destroy villages of the Cayuga and Seneca tribes. After the American Revolution, most of the current Town of Varick was placed in the Central New York Military Tract (1788), land reserved for veterans, with an eastern part in the Cayuga Indian Reservation (1790 until 1795). White settlement followed.

The town was formed from the Town of Romulus in 1830.

During World War II, a large part of the town was appropriated by the US Government to form the Seneca Army Depot (1941–2001), which was a major employer and the only large industry.

Over the years since 1985, Varick has become home to five wineries, all closer to the eastern end of the town, along Cayuga Lake. From north to south, the five are Swedish Hill Vineyard, Cobblestone Farm Winery, Lakeshore Winery, Knapp Winery and Vineyard Restaurant, and Goose Watch Winery. (All but Lakeshore Winery are participating members of the Cayuga Lake Wine Trail, and while the Seneca Lake Wine Trail certainly runs through Varick, none of its stops quite fall within its town lines.)

The Simon Ritter Cobblestone Farmhouse was listed on the National Register of Historic Places in 2008.

== Geography ==
According to the United States Census Bureau, the town has a total area of 45.7 square miles (118 km^{2}), of which 32.0 square miles (83 km^{2}) is land and 13.7 square miles (35 km^{2}) (29.95%) is water.

The eastern town boundary, defined by Cayuga Lake, is the border of Cayuga County. The western town line, at Seneca Lake is the border of Ontario County on the western shore of Seneca Lake. The town is in the Finger Lakes Region of New York.

New York State Route 89, New York State Route 96, New York State Route 96A, and New York State Route 414 are all north–south highways in the town. New York State Route 336 is a short east–west state highway mostly on the north town line.

== Demographics ==
Historical population
Census	Pop.	Note	%±
1830	1,890		—
1840	1,971		4.3%
1850	1,872		−5.0%
1860	1,904		1.7%
1870	1,741		−8.6%
1880	1,739		−0.1%
1890	1,388		−20.2%
1900	1,270		−8.5%
1910	1,173		−7.6%
1920	1,020		−13.0%
1930	1,013		−0.7%
1940	1,056		4.2%
1950	1,086		2.8%
1960	1,480		36.3%
1970	1,700		14.9%
1980	1,868		9.9%
1990	2,161		15.7%
2000	1,729		−20.0%
2010	1,857		7.4%
2020	1,656		−10.8%
2022 (est.)	1,644		−0.7%
U.S. Decennial Census

As of the census of 2010, there were 1,857 people, 676 households, and 460 families residing in the town. The population density was 57.5 inhabitants per square mile (22.2/km^{2}). The racial makeup of the town was 95.2% White, 2.5% Black or African American, 0.2% Native American, 0.2% Asian, 0.0% Pacific Islander, 0.1% from other races, and 1.8% from two or more races. Hispanic or Latino of any race were 1.1% of the population.

There were 676 households, out of which 26.6% had children under the age of 18 living with them, 57.1% were married couples living together, 6.5% had a female householder with no husband present, and 32.0% were non-families. 25.1% of all households were made up of individuals, and 10.5% had someone living alone who was 65 years of age or older. The average household size was 2.58 and the average family size was 3.09.

In the town, the population was spread out, with 32.5% under the age of 20, 4.0% from 20 to 24, 17.4% from 25 to 44, 30.7% from 45 to 64, and 15.4% who were 65 years of age or older. The median age was 40.7 years. For every 100 females, there were 105.4 males. For every 100 females age 18 and over, there were 100.3 males.

The median income for a household in the town was $57.841, and the median income for a family was $66,667. Males had a median income of $46,406 versus $40,714 for females. The per capita income for the town was $27,821. About 5.9% of families and 11.8% of the population were below the poverty line, including 23.3% of those under age 18 and 2.1% of those age 65 or over.

The farmland in the eastern part of the town is now largely worked by Amish farmers, and in the northern part by Mennonite farmers. Farmland on the eastern slope to Cayuga Lake is largely devoted to wine grapes.

=== Housing ===
There were 888 housing units at an average density of 27.5 per square mile (10.6/km^{2}); 23.9% of housing units were vacant.

There were 676 occupied housing units in the town, of which 570 were owner-occupied units (84.3%), while 106 were renter-occupied (15.7%). The homeowner vacancy rate was 2.9% of total units. The rental unit vacancy rate was 18.9%.

NOTE: It is common for resort communities to have higher than normal vacant house counts. Many are vacation homes which are seasonal and not regularly occupied.

== Communities and locations in the Town of Varick ==
- East Varick – A hamlet on the shore of Cayuga Lake and NY-89. (153 residences on Cayuga Lake, of which approximately 20 are considered East Varick.
- Fayette – A hamlet straddling the Fayette town line on NY-414 (56 residences, one bar, one church).
- Kings Corners – A location situated north of McDuffie Town.
- MacDougall – A former hamlet on the northern town line on NY-336. (7 residences, one former bar)
- McDuffie Town – A location near Cayuga Lake on County Road 128. (8 residences, one church)
- Romulus – A hamlet straddling the Romulus town line on NY-96. (73 residences, two churches, convenience store, post office, Romulus Central School)
- Seneca Army Depot – The northern part of the former army supply depot is an institutional residence for youth.
- Varick – A location at NY-96A and County Road 127 near the former Seneca Army Depot. (26 residences, fire department)
- Yale – A former railroad station on Yale Station Rd (CR 126), now farmland.
- East Lake Road – A densely developed residential area along the Seneca Lake shoreline (187 residences)

== Notable people ==
- Suessa Baldridge Blaine (1860-1932), writer of temperance pageants
