= Seneca Park =

Seneca Park may refer to:

- Seneca Park (Louisville, Kentucky), an Olmsted-designed park
- Maplewood Park, an Olmsted-designed park in Rochester, New York, listed on the National Register of Historic Places as "Seneca Park West"
- Seneca Park, an Olmsted-designed park in Rochester, New York, listed on the National Register of Historic Places as "Seneca Park East" and the home of Seneca Park Zoo
