= Seneca Historic District =

Seneca Historic District may refer to:

- Seneca Main Street Historic District, Seneca, Kansas, listed on the National Register of Historic Places (NRHP) in Nemaha County
- Seneca Historic District (Poolesville, Maryland), NRHP-listed in Montgomery County
- Seneca River Crossing Canals Historic District, Montezuma and Tyre, New York, NRHP-listed in New York
- Seneca Avenue East Historic District, Ridgewood, Queens, New York, NY, NRHP-listed in Queens County
- Seneca-Onderdonk-Woodward Historic District, Ridgewood, Queens, New York, NRHP-listed in Queens County
- Seneca Falls Village Historic District, Seneca Falls, New York, NRHP-listed in Seneca County
- Seneca Historic District (Seneca, South Carolina), NRHP-listed in Oconee County
