= Seneca Data =

American custom computer manufacturer

- Industry: Computer Manufacturing, Information Technology
- Founded: 1979
- Fate: Acquired by Arrow Electronics
- Headquarters: Syracuse, New York, United States
- Products: Desktops, Notebooks, Servers, Workstations
- Number of employees: 300
- Website: www.senecadata.com

Seneca Data was an American manufacturer of computers and digital signage equipment. The company originally manufactured custom computers out of their location in Cicero, New York, a suburb of Syracuse. It was acquired by Arrow Electronics in 2014; Arrow has moved all production from New York state to Phoenix, Arizona.

== Operations ==
Seneca Data was a custom computer manufacturer and distributor of computer and information technologies. They engineered products for businesses, education, healthcare, digital signage, digital security and surveillance, and digital broadcast customers around the world. Seneca produced the Nexlink brand of custom-built desktops, notebooks, and servers, along with the Xvault brand of storage appliances as well as media players for digital signage and video wall controllers for broadcast applications. Seneca manufactured custom computers out of Syracuse, NY and produced the Nexlink brand of computer technologies.

== Acquisition by Arrow Electronics ==
In August 2014, Arrow Electronics (NYSE:ARW) acquired Seneca Data Distributors Inc. for 172.6 million. Arrow, at the time based in Englewood, Colorado, listed the company's corporate office in Cicero for sale. Sixty-five of the jobs in Cicero, where it employed 140 people, were moved to Arrow's facility in Phoenix, Arizona. By the end of the first quarter of 2023, all production for the Seneca division had moved to Phoenix, with engineering and technology lab functions remaining in Syracuse.
