= Romulus, New York =

- Town
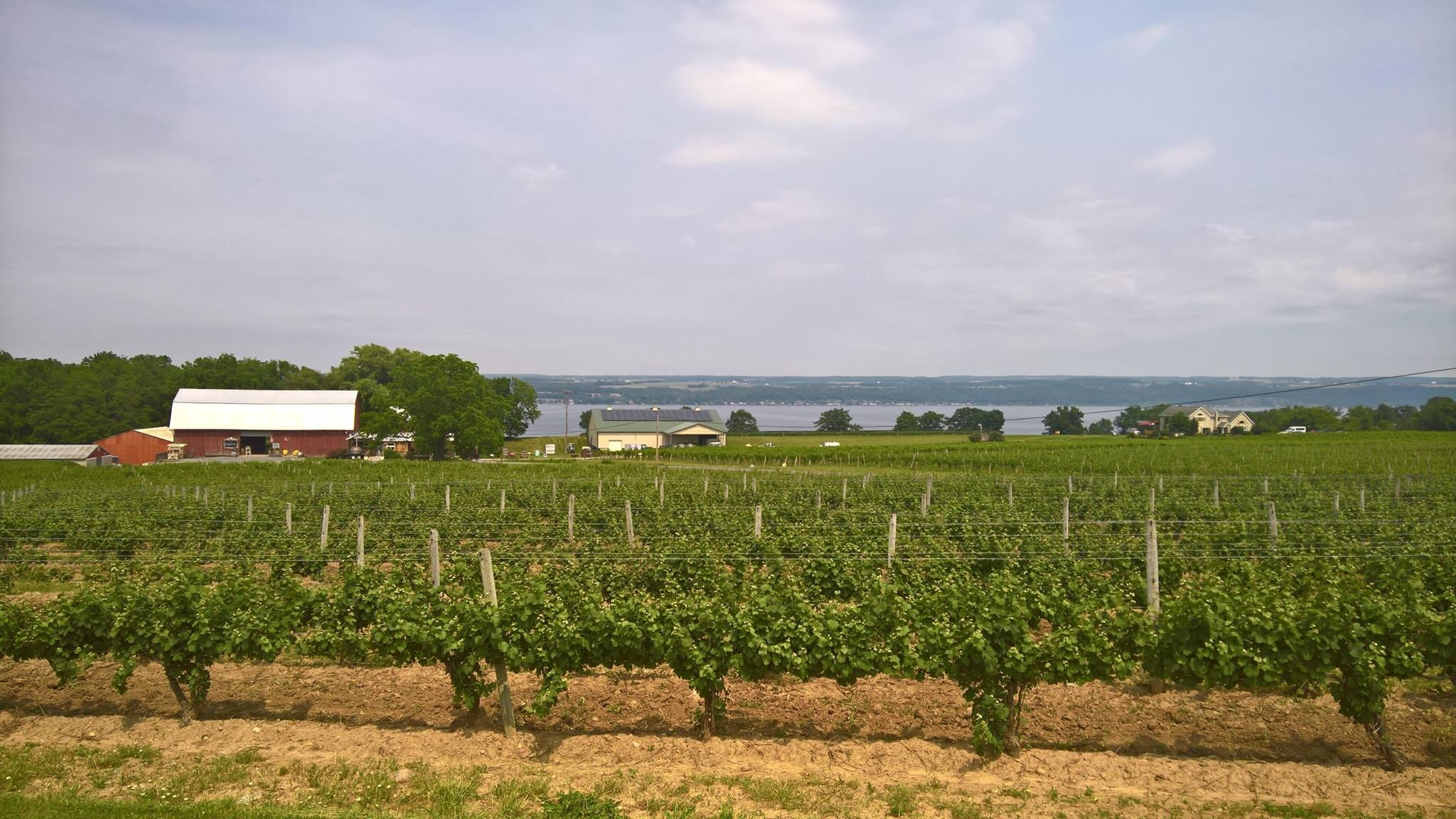
- Cayuga Ridge Estate Winery (foreground) and Cayuga Lake (background) as seen from State Route 89

- Location within the state of New York Romulus, New York (the United States)
- Coordinates: 42°43′19″N 76°50′26″W
- Country: United States
- State: New York
- County: Seneca
- Settled: 1789
- Established: March 5, 1794

Government
  - Type: Town Council
  - Supervisor: David Hayes
  - Clerk: Jane C. Braunig
  - Court: Justice Kyle Collinsworth

Area
  - Total: 51.38 sq mi (133.08 km^{2})
  - Land: 37.79 sq mi (97.88 km^{2})
  - Water: 13.59 sq mi (35.20 km^{2})
- Elevation: 758 ft (231 m)

Population (2020)
  - Total: 3,203
  - Estimate (2022): 2,610
  - Density: 84.7/sq mi (32.72/km^{2})
- Time zone: UTC-5 (Eastern (EST))
  - Summer (DST): UTC-4 (EDT)
- ZIP code: 14541
- Area codes: 315, 607 and 680
- FIPS code: 36-63440
- GNIS feature ID: 0979431
- Website: https://romulusny.gov/

Romulus is a town in Seneca County, New York, United States. The population was 3,203 at the 2020 census. The town is named after the mythical founder of Rome, Romulus, a name assigned by a clerk with an interest in the classics. It is part of the Seneca Falls, NY Micropolitan Statistical Area, which is also included in the Rochester-Batavia-Seneca Falls Combined statistical area.

The town has a hamlet (and census-designated place), also called Romulus. Government offices for the town are located in nearby Willard.

Romulus is home of the rare Seneca white deer, one of the largest populations of white deer in the world. They are located on the grounds of the former Seneca Army Depot. It is now a private wildlife refuge and conservation center which offers scenic tours.

== History ==
Before the American Revolution, this area was controlled by both the Cayuga and the Seneca nations of the Haudenosaunee (Iroquois). French Jesuit missionaries visited the area in the 17th century. The Sullivan Expedition in 1779 destroyed native villages and drove many of the Native Americans away. Romulus contains the area of Kendaia (Apple Town), a former Iroquois (Seneca) village destroyed by the residents in anticipation of the arrival of the Sullivan Expedition on September 5, 1779.

After the war, this town became part of the Central New York Military Tract, land for veterans of the Revolution. Returning natives were provided with land at the north end of Cayuga Lake. This reservation was partly in the eastern side of modern Romulus. The first non-native settlers arrived around 1789.

The town was formed while still part of Onondaga County in 1794. In 1800, part of Romulus was used to make the town of Fayette. The north part of Romulus was used to form the town of Varick in 1830.

The town also contains the former Seneca Army Depot (1941 - 1990s), built during World War II and finally closed in 2001. It was a major employer for citizens of Romulus and surrounding parts of Seneca County. Seneca Army Airfield, located along N.Y. Route 96A, provided a long runway for transport aircraft.

Willard State Hospital was converted to a state prison drug treatment center in 1995.

The town is home to the Five Points Correctional Facility, a New York state maximum security prison for men.

(Portions of a diary written by Henry McLafferty Jr (1819–1859) are available online from the Rochester Public Library: Romulus Revisited: Extracts from the Diary of Henry McLafferty, Jr. 1856–1857).

== Geography ==
The town lies between Cayuga Lake and Seneca Lake at latitude 42° 45' 8" N. and longitude 76° 50' 2" W. at an altitude of 705 ft (214 m).

According to the United States Census Bureau, the town has a total area of 51.4 square miles (133 km^{2}), of which 37.8 square miles (98 km^{2}) is land and 13.6 square miles (35 km^{2}) (26.45%) is water.

Romulus is in the Finger Lakes district of New York and lies between Cayuga Lake and Seneca Lake.

New York State Route 89, New York State Route 96, New York State Route 96A, and New York State Route 414 are all north-south highways in the town.

== Demographics ==
Historical population
Census	Pop.	Note	%±
1820	3,698		—
1830	2,089		−43.5%
1840	2,235		7.0%
1850	2,050		−8.3%
1860	2,170		5.9%
1870	2,223		2.4%
1880	2,765		24.4%
1890	2,852		3.1%
1900	2,895		1.5%
1910	2,803		−3.2%
1920	2,754		−1.7%
1930	2,856		3.7%
1940	2,865		0.3%
1950	4,263		48.8%
1960	3,509		−17.7%
1970	4,284		22.1%
1980	2,464		−42.5%
1990	2,532		2.8%
2000	2,036		−19.6%
2010	4,316		112.0%
2020	3,203		−25.8%
2022 (est.)	2,610	▼	−18.5%
U.S. Decennial Census

As of the census of 2010, there were 4,316 people, 821 households, and 576 families residing in the town. The population density was 114.2 inhabitants per square mile (44.1/km^{2}). The racial makeup of the town was 66.5% white, 29.2% black or African American, .5% Native American, .3% Asian, 2.8% from other races, and .7% from two or more races. Hispanic or Latino of any race were 9.2% of the population.

There were 821 households, out of which 30.5% had children under the age of 18 living with them, 55.4% were married couples living together, 9.9% had a female householder with no husband present, and 29.8% were non-families. 22.2% of all households were made up of individuals, and 9.2% had someone living alone who was 65 years of age or older. The average household size was 2.71 and the average family size was 3.20.

In the town, the population was spread out, with 17.2% under the age of 20, 13.0% from 20 to 24, 39.6% from 25 to 44, 23.5% from 45 to 64, and 6.7% who were 65 years of age or older. The median age was 33.4 years. For every 100 females, there were 264.2 males. For every 100 females age 18 and over, there were 324.1 males.

The median income for a household in the town was $56,705, and the median income for a family was $63,676. Males had a median income of $37,177 versus $30,313 for females. The per capita income for the town was $13,396. About 3.8% of families and 6.3% of the population were below the poverty line, including 7.8% of those under age 18 and 3.7% of those age 65 or over.

=== Housing ===
There were 1,101 housing units at an average density of 29.1 per square mile (11.2/km^{2}). 25.4% of housing units were vacant.

There were 821 occupied housing units in the town. 571 were owner-occupied units (69.5%), while 250 were renter-occupied (30.5%). The homeowner vacancy rate was 2.5% of total units. The rental unit vacancy rate was 12.2%.

NOTE: It is common for resort communities to have higher than normal vacant house counts. Many are vacation homes which are seasonal and not regularly occupied.

== Communities and locations in the town of Romulus ==
- Cayuga Lake - The longest of the Finger Lakes at just under 39 miles in length.
- Dean's Cove Boat Launch - A New York State boat launch site (including power boats) with fishing access located on the west shore of Cayuga Lake just south of the Varick/Romulus town line.
- Elm Beach – A location on the west shore of Cayuga Lake, south of Poplar Beach and just north of the Romulus/Ovid town line on NY-89.
- Five Points Correctional Facility – A maximum security state prison in the town south of the hamlet of Romulus on NY-96.
- Hayts Corners – A hamlet in the southeast of Romulus at the junction of County Roads 129 and 130.
- Kendaia – A hamlet located on NY-96A near the Sampson State Park, built on the site of a former Seneca village.
- Marsh Corner – A location in the eastern part of the town, east of the hamlet of Romulus.
- NY State Veterans Cemetery (formerly Sampson Veterans Memorial Cemetery) - The first New York State veterans cemetery, occupying 162 acres on the east shore of Seneca Lake adjacent to Sampson State Park.
- Pontius Point – A projection into Seneca Lake north of the state park.
- Poplar Beach – A location on the west shore of Cayuga Lake, north of Elm Beach on NY-89.
- Romulus – The hamlet of Romulus is by the north town line on NY-96. It was originally called "Romulusville."
- Romulus Center – A location in the central part of the town, near the junction of NY-414 and NY-96.
- Sampson State Park – A state park on the east shore of Seneca Lake. It is on the site of the former Sampson Naval Base (used during World War II) and the former Sampson Air Force Base (used during the Korean War).
- Seneca Army Depot – The south half of the former US Army supply location is in the town. The land is being re-converted to other uses. The white deer — a genetic quirk that developed naturally on the 7,000-acre, fenced-in expanse — have thrived, even as the depot itself has transitioned from one of the most important Cold War storehouses of bombs and ammunition to a decommissioned relic. It is now home to the Seneca White Deer wildlife refuge and conservation center.
- Seneca Lake – The deepest of the Finger Lakes at 618 feet at its deepest point.
- Tannery Corners – A location in the southeast of Romulus, south of Poplar Beach.
- Willard – A hamlet in the southwest corner, on the shore of Seneca Lake and County Road 132.
- Willard Drug Treatment Center – A former state mental hospital that was taken over by the state prison system. The Willard DTC was closed by the state in March 2023.

== Notable people ==
- William Watts Folwell, the first president of the University of Minnesota was born in Romulus in 1833.
- Mary Catherine Judd, educator, author, and peace activist, was born in Romulus in 1852.
- Jeptha Wade, industrialist and founding member of Western Union, was born in Romulus in 1811.
