= Willard, New York =

Hamlet in New York, United States

Coordinates: 42°40′56″N 76°52′07″W

Willard is a hamlet primarily in the Town of Romulus, Seneca County, New York, United States on the Ovid town line. It is located two miles (3 km) west of the Village of Ovid, at an elevation of 600 feet (183 m). The primary intersection in the hamlet is at N.Y. Route 96A and Main Street (CR 132).

The community overlooks Seneca Lake. Government offices for the Town of Romulus are located in the hamlet.

Willard is the location of the historic Willard Asylum for the Chronic Insane, which is listed on the National Register of Historic Places.

A United States Post Office is located in Willard, with a ZIP Code of 14588.
