= Willard Asylum for the Chronic Insane =

- U.S. National Register of Historic Places
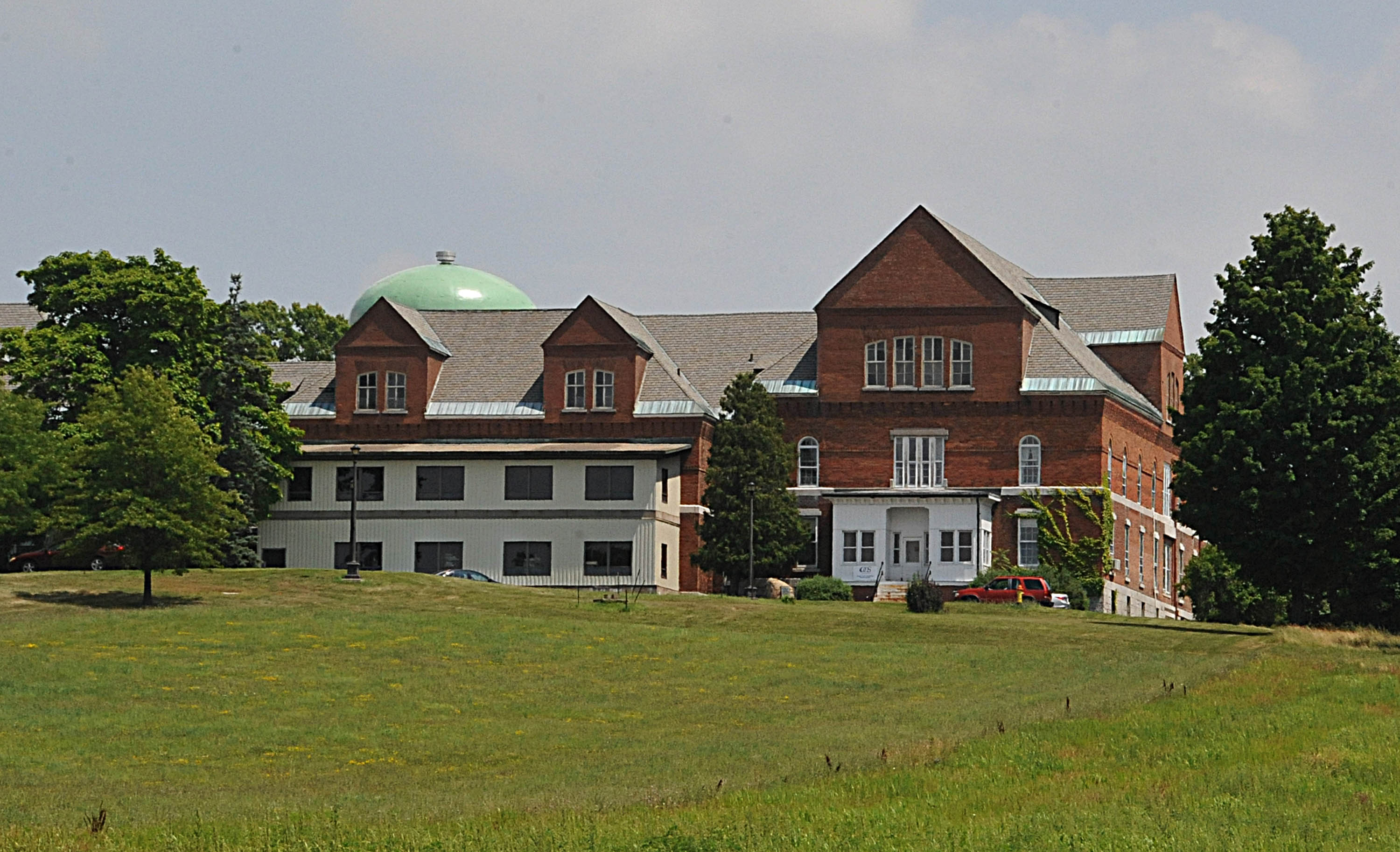

- Location within New York Location within the United States
- Location: Willard, New York
- Coordinates: 42°40′45″N 76°52′46″W
- Built: 1869
- Architect: George Rowley
- Architectural style: Second Empire
- NRHP reference No.: 75001229
- Added to NRHP: March 7, 1975

The Willard Asylum for the Chronic Insane is a former state hospital in Willard, New York, United States, which is listed on the National Register of Historic Places.

In 1865 the Legislature authorized the establishment of The Willard Asylum for the Insane. Opened in 1869, the asylum offered low-cost custodial care. The Willard drug treatment center was opened in 1995 on the campus of the former Willard Psychiatric State Hospital, a facility for mental patients.

In 1995, some 400 suitcases that were brought in by the patients were discovered in an asylum attic. These suitcases were part of a 2014 exhibition at the Exploratorium in San Francisco called "The Changing Face of What is Normal: Mental Health." The exhibit included photography of the contents of the suitcases by John Crispin and poetry about the lives of the patients and staff by Dr. Karen L. Miller who researched the experience of Willard patients and staff.
