= Seneca Army Depot =

Former US Army depot in Seneca County, NY, US

- Varick and Romulus

Site information
- Type: Munitions storage and disposal
- Owner: Seneca County Industrial Development Agency

Location
- Location within New York
- Coordinates: 42.754367°N 76.865845°W

Site history
- In use: 1941 to 1990s

The former Seneca Army Depot occupied 10,587 acres (4,284 ha) between Seneca Lake and Cayuga Lake in Seneca County, New York. It was used as a munitions storage and disposal facility by the United States Army from 1941 until the 1990s. The property was transferred to the Seneca County Industrial Development Agency, which sold it.

Home to the world's largest herd of white deer, the base is in the towns of Varick and Romulus. Adjacent to the storage facility is the now-closed Seneca Army Airfield, whose long runway could handle large cargo aircraft.

== History ==
During the 1940s, the Army stored radioactive materials in connection with the Manhattan Project in igloos E0801 through E0811, on the south end of the Depot. Despite no formal confirmation from the Department of Defense, it is known that during the cold war the depot held the largest stockpile of Army nuclear weapons in the country. The Army RADCON team performed a survey on these igloos during the week of May 13, 1985.

In 1978 the United States Coast Guard opened a Loran-C transmitter station on the base. It closed in 2010, made obsolete by GPS.

The depot was a major employer in the region. It was linked to the outside world by the airfield, railroad lines and highways (NY-96 and NY-96A). The depot was not included in any of the 1990s Base Realignment and Closure plans. After the 1995 base recommendations, the Army announced that the base would close. The Seneca County Industrial Development Agency filed suit in federal court. The lawsuit ended when the Army agreed to provide the same benefits to the community as were available to those in the formal closure process. The depot formally shut down on September 30, 2000.

In August 2002, The Glen Region of the Sports Car Club of America (SCCA) began using the airfield for autocross racing competitions, but site availability after August 2011 is not yet determined.

In early 2007, the Cornell 2007 DARPA Urban Challenge Team began using the depot's private roads to test its autonomous vehicles. Some warehouses are leased to The Advantage Group, which runs a storage and shipping business. Much of the housing at the depot has been sold to private developers and is now available as part of the area's civilian housing stock. Much of the railroad track and outer yards are being used for railroad car storage. As of 2008, no customers ship by rail. The depot's former airfield is slated for use as a New York State Police training center. In early 2007, Cilion announced plans to build an ethanol plant on a portion of the former depot, but the project languished and appears to have died in the face of rising costs for corn and public concern about the wisdom of the project. An article dated July 20, 2009 in the Watertown Daily Times stated that the Fort Drum-based 10th Mountain Division (Light Infantry) would soon start using the depot for combat training.

A portion of the southern end of the base was transferred to New York State and used for the construction of Five Points Correctional Facility, a maximum security prison. Land also was transferred to Seneca County for the construction of a county jail and sheriff's office.

== Demonstrations against nuclear weapons storage ==
Beginning on July 4, 1983, and running for several years, antiwar and anti-nuclear activists mounted major protests at the facility, staging civil disobedience protests and establishing the Seneca Women's Encampment for a Future of Peace and Justice. Major events in 1983 took place in August and October. Social justice photographer and feminist activist Mima Cataldo took photos of this event and published a book documenting the protest. During the October event, many people including Dr. Benjamin Spock climbed the fence surrounding the depot and were detained. Most fence climbers were released after being given "ban and bar letters" telling them they would be charged with trespass if they were apprehended inside the depot again.

Demonstrations continued for several years, mostly originating from within the Women's Peace Encampment for a Future of Peace and Justice, which operated from an old farmhouse on Route 96 in Romulus.

== Current disposition of the depot land ==
The Seneca County Industrial Development Agency marketed the land to manufacturers or other industry.

Much of the land is dotted with large, concrete munitions storage bunkers known as 'igloos'. Development started on the depot's northeastern section, but much of it is non-taxable. As of 2014 the depot is home to a maximum-security state prison, the Five Points Correctional Facility and the Seneca County Law Enforcement Center, which includes the county jail. The non-profit, Hillside Family of Agencies that is headquartered in Rochester, NY closed in the fall of 2019. There are a few private businesses including First Light, which uses some of the ammunition bunkers.

== The White Deer herd ==
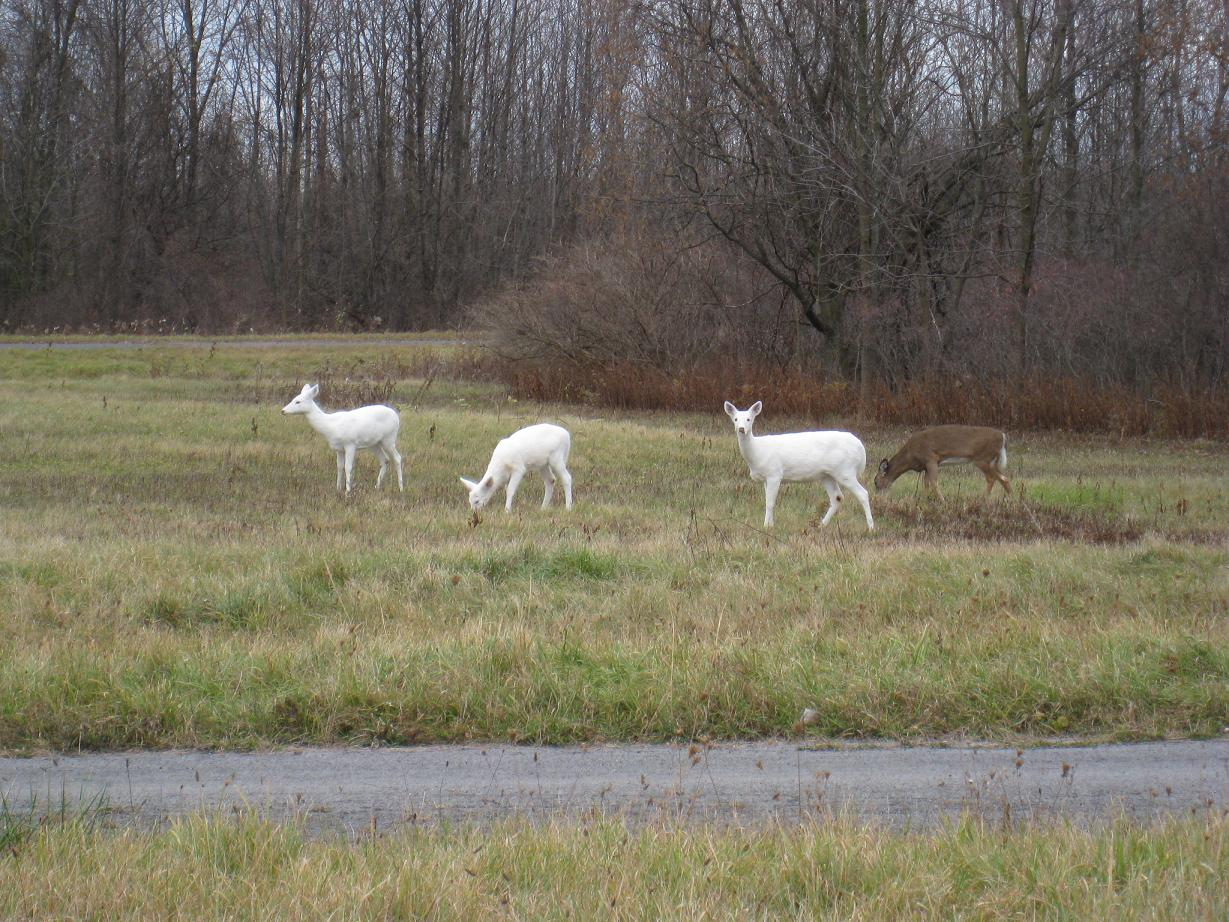
Seneca White Deer inside the depot.

The white deer, long the symbol for the depot, began appearing after the fence was erected in 1941. A handful of White-tailed deer that carried a recessive gene for all-white coats were isolated within the depot. The depot initially allowed only brown-coated deer to be killed, so the herd of white deer grew to more than 200, although hunters are occasionally allowed inside to kill a white deer.

The white deer are naturally occurring, not albinos, and have not pink, but brown eyes. The white deer live alongside another 600 brown white-tailed deer. Seneca White Deer, a non-profit group, received clearance to run limited bus tours in 2006, 2009, and 2012. These tours "turned out to be hugely successful".

In 2016, the property was sold to local businessman Earl Martin of Seneca Iron Works for $900,000 and established as Deer Haven Park, LLC. An agreement was later made between Martin and Dennis Money, founder of Seneca White Deer, Inc., to lease part of the land and operate it as a conservation park for the white deer, although White Deer later shut down, citing financial problems. On June 27, 2020 self-guided auto tours with the option to download an auto tour app were made available.
