= Five Points Correctional Facility =

Maximum security men's prison located in Romulus, New York

Coordinates: 42°42′43″N 76°50′24″W

- Interactive map of Five Points Correctional Facility
- Location: State Route 96 Romulus, New York
- Status: Operational
- Security class: Maximum
- Capacity: 1550
- Opened: 2000
- Managed by: New York State Department of Corrections and Community Supervision

Five Points Correctional Facility (FPCF) is a maximum security state prison for men located in Romulus, New York, and operated by the New York State Department of Corrections and Community Supervision. Five Points is known as a supermax prison.

== History ==
The prison was built in 2000 with a capacity of 1,500 inmates, as well as a Special Housing Unit (SHU) for up to 50 inmates in disciplinary confinement. Five Points was originally named for the five points that are seen from above, showing each housing block location. As of 2008, 71% of the inmates were convicted of a violent crime and 16% of the inmates were being treated for mental health issues.

FPCF's academic courses includes Adult Basic Education (ABE) and Pre-High School Equivalency (Pre-HSE), and High School Equivalency (HSE). Vocational courses includes building maintenance, custodial maintenance, painting/decorating, computer operator, electrical trades, horticulture/ agriculture, small engine repair, masonry, and plumbing/heating. The library contains approximately 3,000 books and periodicals.

== Notable inmates ==
- Willie Bosket – Adult repeat offender who, in 1978, received the maximum five-year sentence for multiple murder as a (fifteen-year-old) juvenile, causing New York to become the first state to change its laws so that juveniles as young as 13 could be tried as an adult for murder.
- Peter Braunstein – former journalist, writer, and playwright dubbed the "Halloween rapist"
- Lemuel Smith – Serial killer and rapist. Convicted of killing six people between 1958 and 1981, including the first ever murder (1981) of an on-duty female corrections officer by an inmate at a prison.
- David Sweat – Transferred there after 2015 escape from Clinton Correctional Facility in Dannemora, New York
