= Seneca County, New York =

County in New York, United States

- County
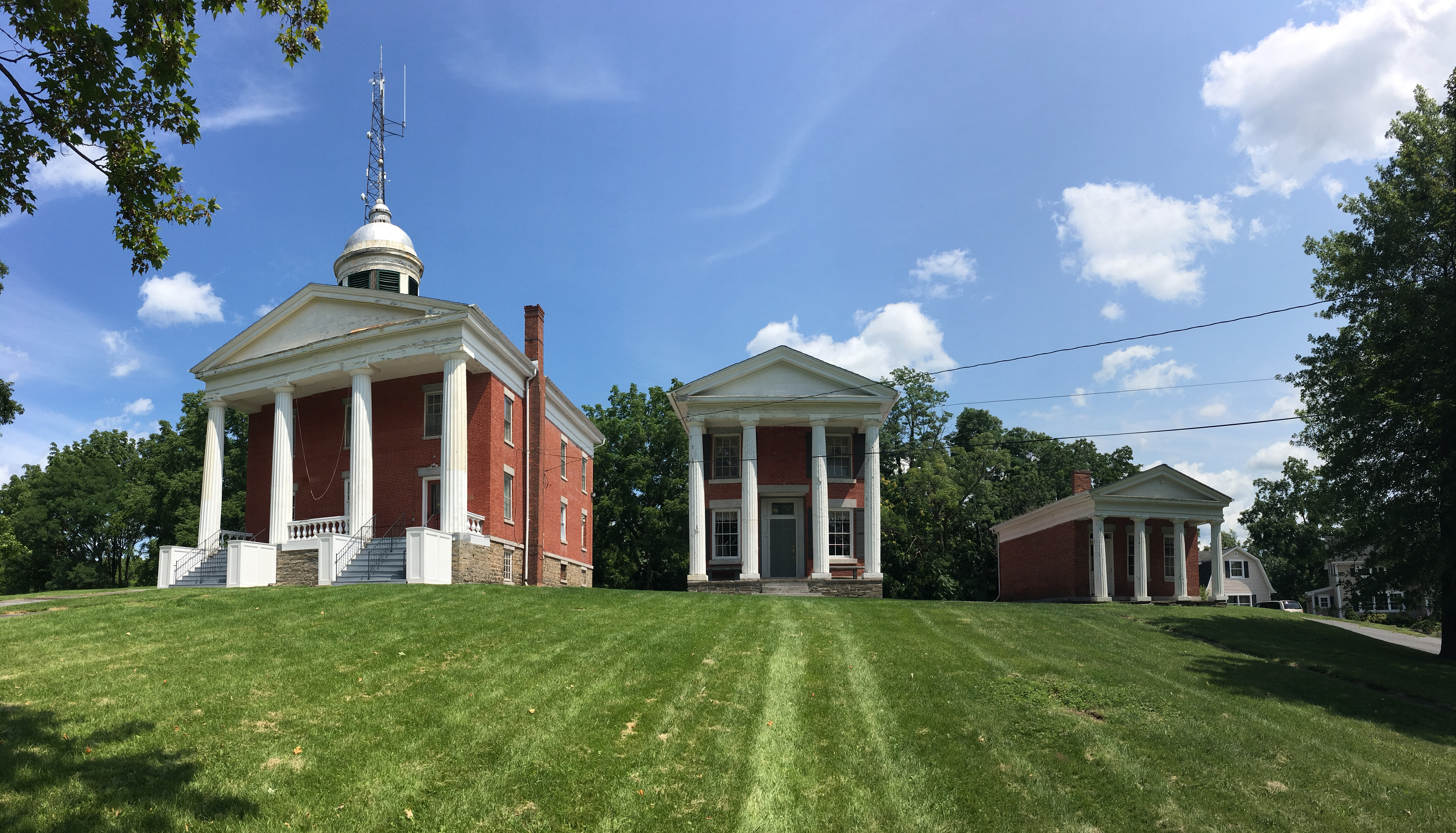
- Historic Seneca County Courthouse Complex at Ovid

- Flag Seal

- Location within the U.S. state of New York
- Coordinates: 42°47′N 76°50′W
- Country: United States
- State: New York
- Founded: 1804
- Named for: Seneca people
- Seat: Waterloo and Ovid
- Largest CDP: Seneca Falls

Area
  - Total: 390 sq mi (1,000 km^{2})
  - Land: 324 sq mi (840 km^{2})
  - Water: 67 sq mi (170 km^{2}) 17%

Population (2020)
  - Total: 33,814
  - Estimate (2025): 32,883 ▼
  - Density: 101.5/sq mi (39.2/km^{2})
- Time zone: UTC−5 (Eastern)
  - Summer (DST): UTC−4 (EDT)
- Congressional district: 24th
- Website: www.senecacountyny.gov

Seneca County is a county in the U.S. state of New York. As of the 2020 census, the population was 33,814. The primary county seat is Waterloo, moved there from the original county seat of Ovid in 1819. It became a two-shire county in 1822, which currently remains in effect and uses both locations as county seats although the majority of Seneca County administrative offices are located in Waterloo. Therefore, most political sources list only Waterloo as the county seat. The county's name comes from the Seneca Nation of the Haudenosaunee (Iroquois), who occupied part of the region. The county is part of the Finger Lakes region of the state.

Seneca County comprises the Seneca Falls, NY Micropolitan Statistical Area, which is also included in the Rochester-Batavia-Seneca Falls, NY Combined Statistical Area.

== History ==
The area covered by Seneca County straddles the prehistoric territories of both Seneca and Cayuga Nations of the Haudenosaunee. This county was reduced in size on July 3, 1766, by the creation of Cumberland County, and further on March 16, 1770, by the creation of Gloucester County, both containing territory now in Vermont.

On March 12, 1772, what was left of Albany County was split into three parts, one remaining under the name Albany County. One of the other pieces, Tryon County, contained the western portion (and thus, since no western boundary was specified, theoretically still extended west to the Pacific). The eastern boundary of Tryon County was approximately five miles west of the present city of Schenectady, and the county included the western part of the Adirondack Mountains and the area west of the West Branch of the Delaware River. The area then designated as Tryon County now includes 37 counties of New York State. The county was named for William Tryon, colonial governor of New York.

In the years prior to 1776, most of the Loyalists in Tryon County fled to Canada. In the fall of 1779 on orders from commander-in-chief General George Washington the Sullivan Expedition conducted a scorched earth campaign against the Iroquois who sided with the Loyalists in the Revolutionary War. Sullivan's path destroyed Cayuga and Seneca villages along the east shore of Seneca Lake.

In 1784, following the peace treaty that ended the American Revolutionary War, the name of Tryon County was changed to Montgomery County in honor of the general, Richard Montgomery, who had captured several places in Canada and died attempting to capture the city of Quebec, replacing the name of the hated British governor.

In 1789, Montgomery County was reduced in size by the splitting off of Ontario County. The actual area split off from Montgomery County was much larger than the present Ontario County, also including the present Allegany, Cattaraugus, Chautauqua, Erie, Genesee, Livingston, Monroe, Niagara, Orleans, Steuben, Wyoming, Yates, and parts of Schuyler and Wayne counties.

Herkimer County was one of three counties split off from Montgomery County (the others being Otsego and Tioga counties) in 1791.

Onondaga County was formed in 1794 by the splitting of Herkimer County.

Cayuga County was formed in 1799 by the splitting of Onondaga County. This county was, however, much larger than the present Cayuga County. It then included the present Seneca and Tompkins counties and part of Wayne County.

In 1804, Seneca County was formed by the splitting of Cayuga County.

In 1817, Seneca County was reduced in size by combining portions of Seneca and the remainder of Cayuga County to form Tompkins County. Part of this territory, the current towns of Covert and Lodi, were returned to Seneca County in 1819.

The original county seat of Seneca County was located in Ovid, where a court house was constructed in 1806. After southern portions of the county were removed in 1817 to become part of Tompkins County, the seat was moved to Waterloo as the village was more geographically centered at the time. In 1823, northern portions of the county were removed to form part of Wayne County. This put Waterloo in the same situation as Ovid with being on one end of Seneca County. A compromise was made to use both locations as county seats, becoming a two-shire county. It included the constitution of two county courts and jury districts under Chapter 137 of the New York State Laws of 1822. In 1895, the Seneca County Board of Supervisors voted to abolish the setup of two jury districts. It later voted to remove the two-shire county system in 1921, making Waterloo the only county seat, but was reinstated two years later. At least once a year, the County Board of Supervisors holds its monthly meeting in Ovid to maintain the two-shire status.

In 1823, Seneca County was reduced in size by combining portions of Seneca and Ontario counties to form Wayne County.

On April 6, 1830, the Church of Jesus Christ of Latter Day Saints was founded in Seneca County. The event took place at the log home of a local farmer, Peter Whitmer. Although church headquarters moved out of the area shortly thereafter, a historical visitor center is still operated at that location.

== Geography ==
According to the U.S. Census Bureau, the county has a total area of 390 square miles (1,000 km^{2}), of which 324 square miles (840 km^{2}) is land and 67 square miles (170 km^{2}) (17%) is water.

Seneca County is in the western part of New York in the Finger Lakes Region, bounded on the east by Cayuga Lake and on the west by Seneca Lake.

The Finger Lakes National Forest is in the south part of the county.

Both the New York State Thruway and the Erie Canal cross the northern part of the county.

The former Seneca Army Depot occupies a portion of land between Cayuga and Seneca Lakes. The former Willard Drug Treatment Center and Five Points Correctional Facility are two New York State prisons located in the county. Sampson State Park is located next to the former Army base.

=== Adjacent counties ===
- Wayne County - north
- Cayuga County - east
- Tompkins County - southeast
- Schuyler County - south
- Yates County - southwest
- Ontario County - west

=== Major highways ===
- Interstate 90 (New York State Thruway)
- U.S. Route 20
- New York State Route 5
- New York State Route 89
- New York State Route 96
- New York State Route 96A
- New York State Route 414
- New York State Route 336

=== National protected areas ===
- Finger Lakes National Forest (part)
- Montezuma National Wildlife Refuge (part)
- Women's Rights National Historical Park

== Demographics ==
Historical population
Census	Pop.	Note	%±
1810	16,609		—
1820	23,619		42.2%
1830	21,041		−10.9%
1840	24,874		18.2%
1850	25,441		2.3%
1860	28,138		10.6%
1870	27,823		−1.1%
1880	29,278		5.2%
1890	28,227		−3.6%
1900	28,114		−0.4%
1910	26,972		−4.1%
1920	24,735		−8.3%
1930	24,983		1.0%
1940	25,732		3.0%
1950	29,253		13.7%
1960	31,984		9.3%
1970	35,083		9.7%
1980	33,733		−3.8%
1990	33,683		−0.1%
2000	33,342		−1.0%
2010	35,251		5.7%
2020	33,814		−4.1%
2025 (est.)	32,883	▼	−2.8%
U.S. Decennial Census; 1790-1960 1900-90; 1990-2000 2010-2020 2025

=== 2020 census ===
Seneca County, New York – Racial and ethnic composition Note: the US Census treats Hispanic/Latino as an ethnic category. This table excludes Latinos from the racial categories and assigns them to a separate category. Hispanics/Latinos may be of any race.
Race / Ethnicity (NH = Non-Hispanic)	Pop 1980	Pop 1990	Pop 2000	Pop 2010	Pop 2020	% 1980	% 1990	% 2000	% 2010	% 2020
White alone (NH)	32,899	32,501	31,338	31,999	29,273	97.53%	96.49%	93.99%	90.77%	86.57%
Black or African American alone (NH)	334	513	720	1,513	1,263	0.99%	1.52%	2.16%	4.29%	3.74%
Native American or Alaska Native alone (NH)	50	84	71	96	151	0.15%	0.25%	0.21%	0.27%	0.45%
Asian alone (NH)	142	212	225	238	268	0.42%	0.63%	0.67%	0.68%	0.79%
Native Hawaiian or Pacific Islander alone (NH)	x	x	2	2	3	x	x	0.01%	0.01%	0.01%
Other race alone (NH)	25	10	13	47	80	0.07%	0.03%	0.04%	0.13%	0.24%
Mixed race or Multiracial (NH)	x	x	314	404	1,409	x	x	0.94%	1.15%	4.17%
Hispanic or Latino (any race)	283	363	659	952	1,367	0.84%	1.08%	1.98%	2.70%	4.04%
Total	33,733	33,683	33,342	35,251	33,814	100.00%	100.00%	100.00%	100.00%	100.00%

=== 2010 census ===
As of the census of 2010, there were 35,251 people, 13,393 households, and 8,762 families residing in the county. The population density was 103 people per square mile (40 people/km^{2}). There were 14,794 housing units at an average density of 46 units per square mile (18/km^{2}). The racial makeup of the county was 93.7% White, 5.1% African American, 0.8% Native American, 0.8% Asian, 0.01% Pacific Islander, 0.9% from other races, and 1.3% from two or more races. Hispanic or Latino of any race were 2.7% of the population. 18.9% were of Italian, 16.7% German, 14.6% English, 13.4% Irish and 8.9% American ancestry according to Census 2000. 95.3% spoke English and 1.6% Spanish as their first language.

There were 12,630 households, out of which 31.90% had children under the age of 18 living with them, 53.60% were married couples living together, 10.30% had a female householder with no husband present, and 31.70% were non-families. 25.30% of all households were made up of individuals, and 11.60% had someone living alone who was 65 years of age or older. The average household size was 2.51 and the average family size was 2.99.

In the county, the population was spread out, with 24.80% under the age of 18, 7.50% from 18 to 24, 28.80% from 25 to 44, 23.80% from 45 to 64, and 15.10% who were 65 years of age or older. The median age was 38 years. For every 100 females there were 100.10 males. For every 100 females age 18 and over, there were 99.50 males.

The median income for a household in the county was $37,140, and the median income for a family was $45,445. Males had a median income of $32,512 versus $24,320 for females. The per capita income for the county was $17,630. About 8.00% of families and 11.50% of the population were below the poverty line, including 14.80% of those under age 18 and 7.30% of those age 65 or over.

== Government and politics ==
United States presidential election results for Seneca County, New York
Year	Republican		Democratic		Third party(ies)	
Year	No.	%	No.	%	No.	%
1884	3,309	46.51%	3,627	50.98%	178	2.50%
1888	3,576	48.07%	3,705	49.81%	158	2.12%
1892	3,112	46.40%	3,199	47.70%	396	5.90%
1896	3,853	53.53%	3,213	44.64%	132	1.83%
1900	3,787	51.18%	3,461	46.78%	151	2.04%
1904	3,823	52.53%	3,288	45.18%	167	2.29%
1908	3,749	52.80%	3,136	44.16%	216	3.04%
1912	2,336	34.57%	2,573	38.07%	1,849	27.36%
1916	3,307	50.84%	2,845	43.74%	353	5.43%
1920	6,260	64.56%	3,023	31.18%	413	4.26%
1924	6,598	66.15%	2,727	27.34%	649	6.51%
1928	7,911	66.27%	3,873	32.44%	154	1.29%
1932	6,502	56.61%	4,764	41.48%	220	1.92%
1936	7,919	63.59%	4,295	34.49%	240	1.93%
1940	8,364	66.39%	4,203	33.36%	31	0.25%
1944	7,424	63.52%	4,236	36.24%	28	0.24%
1948	7,266	58.05%	4,897	39.13%	353	2.82%
1952	9,669	69.01%	4,328	30.89%	15	0.11%
1956	10,417	74.20%	3,623	25.80%	0	0.00%
1960	8,741	60.55%	5,693	39.44%	1	0.01%
1964	4,473	33.44%	8,890	66.46%	13	0.10%
1968	7,083	54.46%	5,222	40.15%	700	5.38%
1972	9,368	67.68%	4,441	32.08%	33	0.24%
1976	7,659	56.70%	5,745	42.53%	104	0.77%
1980	7,174	52.40%	5,010	36.60%	1,506	11.00%
1984	9,420	65.84%	4,825	33.72%	62	0.43%
1988	7,221	53.21%	6,215	45.80%	135	0.99%
1992	5,432	36.28%	5,810	38.80%	3,732	24.92%
1996	5,004	35.86%	6,825	48.91%	2,126	15.23%
2000	6,734	46.97%	6,841	47.71%	763	5.32%
2004	7,981	52.08%	6,979	45.54%	365	2.38%
2008	7,038	47.74%	7,422	50.35%	281	1.91%
2012	5,889	44.39%	7,094	53.48%	283	2.13%
2016	7,236	51.76%	5,697	40.75%	1,047	7.49%
2020	8,329	53.28%	6,914	44.23%	389	2.49%
2024	8,379	55.47%	6,610	43.76%	116	0.77%

The county is governed by a fourteen-member board of supervisors, composed of the town supervisor representing each of the ten towns in Seneca County along with four additional at-large members from the towns of Waterloo and Seneca Falls (two per town). The board normally meets every 2nd Tuesday of the month at the Seneca County Office Building in Waterloo with at least one meeting per year held at the old Seneca County Courthouse Complex in Ovid as honor of the two-shire system. Each supervisor has a weighted vote based on the population of the town they represent.

Historically a Republican-voting county, Seneca has become more competitive in recent years and is now a swing county in Presidential elections. With the exception of 2000 and 2020, when Al Gore and Donald Trump, respectively, carried the county, voters here have opted for the winner of every Presidential election since 1980. In 2024, Donald Trump carried the county by over 55%, the highest percentage for any candidate from either party since Reagan in 1984.

== Communities ==
=== Larger settlements ===
#	Location	Population	Type	Region
1	Seneca Falls	6,681	CDP	North
2	†Waterloo	5,171	Village	North
3	Interlaken	602	Village	Cayuga
3	Ovid	602	Village	Seneca
5	Romulus	409	CDP	Cayuga
6	Lodi	291	Village	Seneca

† - County Seat

=== Towns ===
- Covert
- Fayette
- Junius
- Lodi
- Ovid
- Romulus
- Seneca Falls
- Tyre
- Varick
- Waterloo

=== Hamlets ===
Seneca county has a number of unincorporated communities. Most are considered hamlets.

- Border City
- Bridgeport
- Canoga
- Caywood
- Covert
- Dobbins Corner
- Dublin
- East Geneva
- East Varick
- Fayette
- Kendaia
- MacDougall
- Magee
- Malcom
- Mays Point
- Townsendville
- Tyre
- Varick
- Willard

== Education ==
School districts include:

- Clyde-Savannah Central School District
- Geneva City School District
- Lyons Central School District
- Phelps-Clifton Springs Central School District
- Romulus Central School District
- Seneca Falls Central School District
- South Seneca Central School District
- Trumansburg Central School District
- Waterloo Central School District

== See also ==
- List of counties in New York
- National Register of Historic Places listings in Seneca County, New York
- List of county routes in Seneca County, New York
