= Morrow Creek =

Location
- Country: United States
- State: New York
- County: Tompkins County

Physical characteristics
- Mouth: Cayuga Lake
  - location: Lake Ridge, New York, United States
  - coordinates: 42°35′27″N 76°37′28″W

Morrow Creek is a stream located in the Town of Lansing in Tompkins County, New York, in the Finger Lakes region of upstate New York. It flows into Cayuga Lake near Lake Ridge. Morrow Creek is one of over 140 streams that drain into Cayuga Lake along its 95-mile (153 km) shoreline.

== Geography ==
Morrow Creek flows through the northern portion of the Town of Lansing, situated on the eastern shore of Cayuga Lake in the Finger Lakes region. The creek drains into Cayuga Lake, which is the longest and second-largest of the Finger Lakes by surface area, extending over 38 miles (61 km) with a maximum depth of 435 feet (133 m). The Cayuga Lake watershed covers approximately 785 square miles across parts of six counties — Cayuga, Tompkins, Seneca, Schuyler, Tioga, and Cortland — and is the largest watershed of any of the Finger Lakes.

Morrow Creek forms part of the broader Salmon Creek sub-watershed. The principal major tributaries of Cayuga Lake include Salmon Creek, Fall Creek, Cayuga Inlet, and Taughannock Creek.

== Watershed and water quality ==
The Cayuga Lake watershed, into which Morrow Creek drains, has been identified as a concern for phosphorus loading. The New York State Department of Environmental Conservation (NYSDEC) monitors the lake through several ongoing programs, including the Statewide Citizen Lake Assessment Program (CSLAP), the Finger Lakes Watershed Program, and the Cayuga Lake Modeling Project. Agricultural land use in the Town of Lansing represents a significant share of the surrounding landscape, and nonpoint-source runoff from farms is among the primary contributors to nutrient loading in the Cayuga Lake basin. A Total Maximum Daily Load (TMDL) clean water plan targeting phosphorus in Cayuga Lake was released in 2024.

== See also ==
- Cayuga Lake
- Salmon Creek (Cayuga Lake)
- Tompkins County, New York
- Finger Lakes
