= Sheldrake =

Sheldrake or Shelldrake may refer to:

== Places ==
=== Canada ===
- Sheldrake, a settlement within the Municipality of Rivière-au-Tonnerre, Quebec
- Sheldrake Island, New Brunswick
- Sheldrake River, Nunavik, Quebec
- Sheldrake River (Minganie), Côte-Nord, Quebec

=== United States ===
- Loch Sheldrake, New York, a hamlet within the town of Fallsburg, Sullivan County, New York
- Sheldrake Lake (New York), a reservoir within the city of New Rochelle, Westchester County, New York
- Sheldrake Creek, Seneca County, New York
- Sheldrake River, Westchester County, New York
- Shelldrake River, Michigan
- Shelldrake, Michigan, a ghost town

== People ==
- Cosmo Sheldrake, English musician, composer and producer
- Eddie Sheldrake (1926–2025), American basketball player and restaurateur
- Edgar Sheldrake (1864—1950), English cricketer and publisher
- Khalid Sheldrake (1888–1947), British pickle manufacturer and self-proclaimed "King of Islamistan"
- Merlin Sheldrake (born 1987), English author and biologist
- Rupert Sheldrake (born 1942), English author, lecturer and researcher

== Other uses ==
- Sheldrake, an alternate name of shelducks in the genus Tadorna
- Sheldrake, a character in the 1950 Billy Wilder film Sunset Boulevard, played by Fred Clark
- Jeff D. Sheldrake, a character in the 1960 Billy Wilder film The Apartment, played by Fred MacMurray
- Dr Sheldrake, a character in the 1964 Billy Wilder film Kiss Me, Stupid, played by Mel Blanc
- Percival Sheldrake and Cyril Sheldrake, fictional characters who adopt the British Batman Knight persona in DC comics
