= Schuyler Creek =

River in the United States of America

Location
- Country: United States
- State: New York

Physical characteristics
- Mouth: Cayuga Lake
  - location: Fayette, New York, United States
  - coordinates: 42°48′10″N 76°45′49″W
- Basin size: 1.19 mi^{2} (3.1 km^{2})

Schuyler Creek is a river located in Seneca County, New York. It flows into Cayuga Lake by Fayette, New York.
