= Paynes Creek =

Paynes Creek, Paines Creek, or Payne's Creek may refer to:

- Payne's Creek, a stream
- Payne Creek (Florida), a stream
- Paines Creek (New York), a stream
- Paynes Creek, California, a census designated place
- Paynes Creek Historic State Park, in Florida
- Paynes Creek National Park, in Belize

== See also ==
- Payne Creek (Antarctica)
