= Cayuga Heights, New York =

- Village
- Location within the state of New York
- Coordinates: 42°27′59″N 76°29′19″W
- Country: United States
- State: New York
- County: Tompkins
- Incorporated: 1915
- Named for: Cayuga Lake
- Seat: Marcham Hall

Government
  - Mayor: Linda Woodard
  - Trustees: Kent Hubbell, James Marshall, Meloney McMurry, Kristina Rennekamp, Richard Robinson, Peter Salton

Area
  - Total: 1.77 sq mi (4.58 km^{2})
  - Land: 1.77 sq mi (4.58 km^{2})
  - Water: 0 sq mi (0.00 km^{2})

Population (2020)
  - Total: 4,114
  - Density: 2,328.6/sq mi (899.07/km^{2})
- Time zone: UTC-5 (Eastern (EST))
  - Summer (DST): UTC-4 (EDT)
- Zip Code: 14850
- Area code: 607
- FIPS code: 36-13079
- GNIS feature ID: 0969981
- Website: cayugaheights.gov

Cayuga Heights is a village in the Town of Ithaca, Tompkins County, New York, United States, and a suburb of Ithaca, New York. The population was 4,114 at the 2020 census.

It is north of Cornell University's main campus and home to many Cornell faculty members, including the university's president.

== History ==
After the Revolutionary War, much of Upstate New York was divided and given to veterans as part of the Central New York Military Tract. Several veterans received lots in what is now Cayuga Heights and started farms.

In the early 1800s, Ithaca started to grow as a small city and inland port. In 1865, Ezra Cornell started Cornell University. Students and faculty members initially lived on campus and in Ithaca, but rapid expansion in the late 1800s and early 1900s spurred new development north of the Fall Creek gorge. Two trolley bridges were built across the gorge, and a streetcar connected downtown, Cornell, and the budding residential development north of the gorge.

In 1901, local businessmen Charles Newman and Jared Blood bought nearly 1,000 acres of farmland and started the Cayuga Heights Land Company. They hired landscape architect Harold Caparn, who designed the Brooklyn Botanic Garden, to design an organic, curving, park-like layout of roads and trees. Cayuga Heights was incorporated as a village in 1915, consisting of a one-half square mile of land from the City of Ithaca line to what is now Upland Road. The name Cayuga Heights reflects the village's position overlooking Cayuga Lake. In 1924, Cayuga Heights Elementary School was built.

After World War II, Cayuga Heights continued to expand. Community Corners Shopping Center was built in 1947 as a small suburban shopping plaza for residents. In 1952, the village opened its wastewater treatment plant on the shore of Cayuga Lake.

The village resisted attempts to be annexed by the growing City of Ithaca. Instead, it more than tripled in size in 1954 when it annexed approximately 1.4 square miles of land in the Town of Ithaca, extending from Upland Road to the Town of Lansing border. A large addition was built onto Cayuga Heights Elementary School in the late 1950s. In 1969, the First Congregational Church relocated from downtown Ithaca to a new building on the former site of the Country Club of Ithaca, which had relocated a mile east.

The village was a founding member of the Bolton Point Water System when it opened in the mid-1970s. In 1980, Cayuga Heights Elementary School closed due to declining enrollment. It reopened in 1988.

In 1995, the last large plot of open land in Cayuga Heights, the former Savage Farm, was developed into a retirement community, Kendal at Ithaca, by the Kendal Corporation.

Kendal has since become home to several retired Cornell University faculty members; a local telling for many years was that it had the best physics department in the country, as Nobel Prize winner Hans Bethe, along with Boyce McDaniel, Dale Corson, and many other physicists, were long-time residents.

On January 12, 2015, the board of trustees of the Village of Cayuga Heights unanimously adopted a resolution declaring freedom from domestic violence to be a fundamental human right.

=== Deer controversy ===
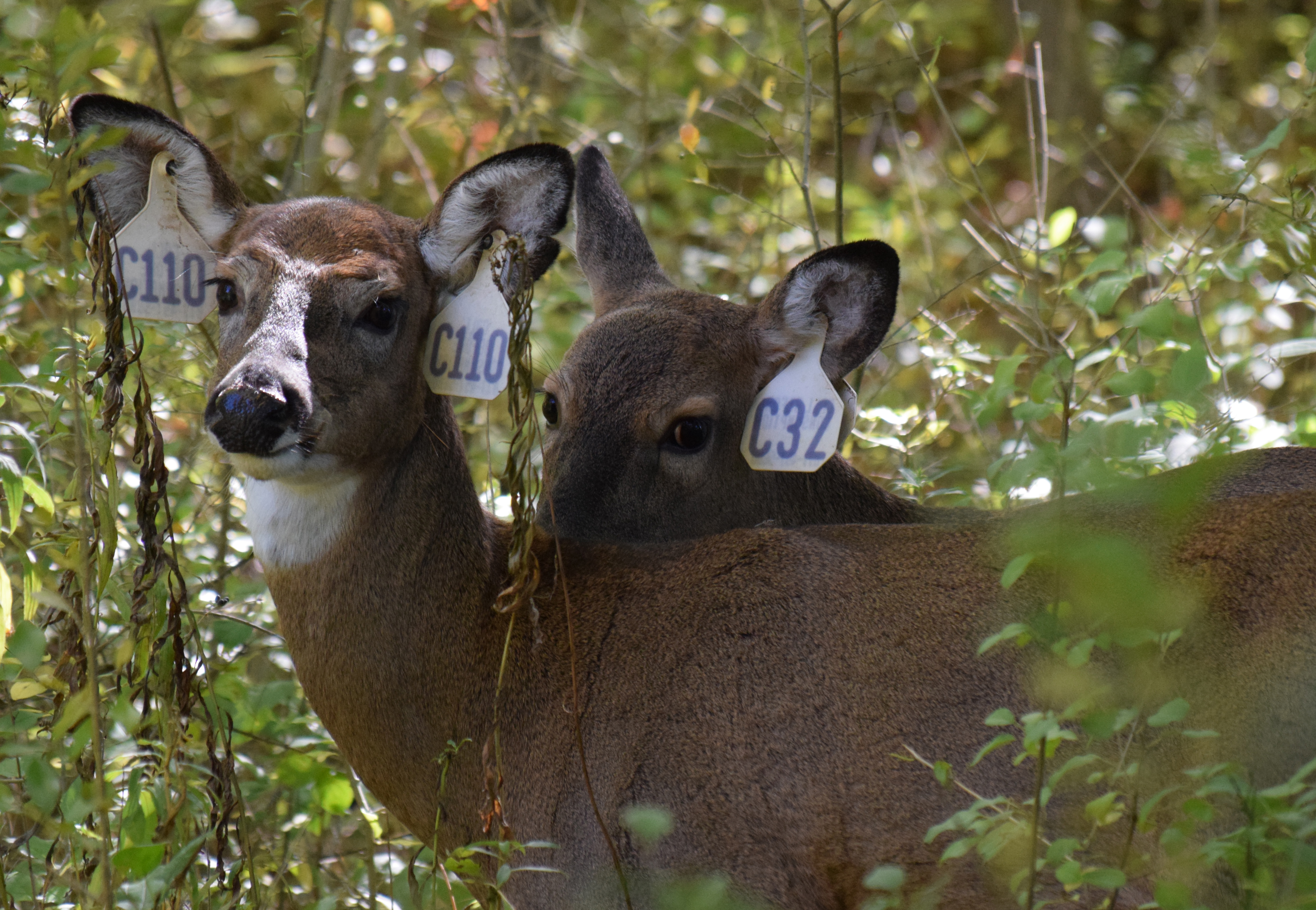
Two tagged white-tail deer in Cayuga Heights

Cayuga Heights has received national attention for its large white-tailed deer population, as many as 125 per square mile. Efforts to control the deer population have sparked huge controversy in the village.

In 2011, the village Board of Trustees approved a plan to reduce the deer population by sterilizing 20 to 60 does in two years while killing the remaining 160 to 200 deer in the village. Paul Curtis, a Natural Resources Professor at Cornell who has worked with the board of trustees, said "The primary problems that the deer cause to the community are damage to garden plants, deer-vehicle accidents, and the potential threat of the spread of foreign diseases.” Opponents of the deer culling program have criticized it as a "war on sweet innocent deer", a "brutal slaughter", and Cayuga Heights as a "constant killing field". Local opposition group CayugaDeer.org has accused the board of trustees' actions of being deceptive and dishonest, and sued the village to stop the culling. Few residents agreed to allow the village to cull deer on their property, and in November 2012, the board of trustees abandoned its plan to cull the deer, instead deciding to capture and sterilize does.

== Geography ==
Cayuga Heights is located on the eastern slope of Cayuga Lake. The elevation ranges from 900 feet near Community Corners Shopping Center to 400 feet near the lake. Several streams and steep gorges cut through the village.

According to the United States Census Bureau, the village has a total area of 1.8 square miles (4.7 km^{2}), all of it land.

The village is at the southeast end of Cayuga Lake, one of the Finger Lakes. It borders Lansing to the north and Northeast Ithaca to the east.

Two examples of old-growth oak/hickory forests are in the village: Palmer Woods, on the south side of the village near Cornell campus, and Renwick Slope, on the far western part of the village by Cayuga Lake. Both are managed by Cornell Botanic Gardens.

== Demographics ==
Historical population
Census	Pop.	Note	%±
1920	179		—
1930	507		183.2%
1940	651		28.4%
1950	1,131		73.7%
1960	2,788		146.5%
1970	3,130		12.3%
1980	3,170		1.3%
1990	3,457		9.1%
2000	3,273		−5.3%
2010	3,729		13.9%
2020	4,114		10.3%
U.S. Decennial Census

=== 2020 census ===
As of the 2020 census, Cayuga Heights had a population of 4,114. The population density was 2,286 inhabitants per square mile (883/km^{2}).

In the village, the population was spread out, with 11.8% under the age of 18, 16.8% under the age of 20, 24.4% from 20 to 24, 18.6% from 25 to 44, 17.5% from 45 to 64, and 22.7% who were 65 years of age or older. The median age was 31.8 years. For every 100 females, there were 101.5 males. For every 100 females age 18 and over, there were 101.4 males age 18 and over.

98.5% of residents lived in urban areas, while 1.5% lived in rural areas.

There were 1,470 households in Cayuga Heights, of which 19.2% had children under the age of 18 living in them. Of all households, 44.8% were married-couple households, 20.8% were households with a male householder and no spouse or partner present, and 30.5% were households with a female householder and no spouse or partner present. About 40.9% of all households were made up of individuals, and 17.9% had someone living alone who was 65 years of age or older. The average household size was 2.07.

There were 1,678 housing units at an average density of 932 per square mile (360/km^{2}), of which 12.4% were vacant. The homeowner vacancy rate was 1.7%, and the rental vacancy rate was 8.8%.

Racial composition as of the 2020 census
Race	Number	Percent
White	2,939	71.4%
Black or African American	136	3.3%
American Indian and Alaska Native	15	0.4%
Asian	597	14.5%
Native Hawaiian and Other Pacific Islander	2	0.0%
Some other race	146	3.5%
Two or more races	279	6.8%
Hispanic or Latino (of any race)	291	7.1%

=== Income and poverty ===
According to the 2020 American Community Survey, the median annual income for a household in the village was approximately $96,250. Males living alone had a median annual income of $34,868 versus $40,446 for females. The mean annual income for the village was $155,141. 6.4% of households made less than $10,000 annually.

== Arts and culture ==
Points of interest:

- Community Corners
- Kendal at Ithaca
- Pleasant Grove Cemetery
- RaNic Golf Club (formerly the Country Club of Ithaca, 1900–2020)
- Sunset Park

== Government ==
The main governmental body of the Village of Cayuga Heights is the board of trustees. Meetings are convened by the mayor or by an appointed deputy. The village offices are in Marcham Hall, a stone mansion built by a granddaughter of Ezra Cornell

=== Mayors ===
- Frederick G. Marcham, 1956-1987
- Ronald Anderson, 1988-2002
- Walter Lynn, 2003-2007
- Jim Gilmore, 2008-2012
- Kate Supron, 2012-May 2016
- Linda Woodard, June 2016-present

== Education ==
The village is in the Ithaca City School District. The zoned comprehensive high school is Ithaca High School.

== Infrastructure ==
=== Fire department ===
The Cayuga Heights Fire Department was founded in 1955 and provides fire, rescue, and ALS first-response emergency medical services to the village, areas of the Town of Ithaca, and parts of Cornell University. The department is an all-volunteer agency. The department uses a "bunker program", which allows 7-8 Firefighter/EMTs to live in a second-floor dormitory and provide duty shifts in exchange for their room in the station. Unlike conventional membership recruiting/acceptance methods, the department recruits and restricts new member acceptance to bi-annual "recruit classes" in tandem with the academic semesters. As a result, many firefighters are Cornell students.

The department's current home, the Ronald E. Anderson Fire Station, was built in 2000 and named after the then-mayor. The fire company is technically a 501(c)(3) non-profit independent of the village, which allows it to sponsor annual fundraising drives.

=== Police department ===
The Cayuga Heights Police Department is a small department consisting of a chief, a sergeant, four full-time officers, a clerk, and several part-time officers and school crossing guards.

== Notable people ==
- A.R. Ammons – poet and National Book Award winner
- Hans Bethe – physicist and Nobel Prize winner
- Pearl S. Buck – writer, novelist, and Nobel Prize winner
- Irene Castle – film star who appeared on Broadway and in silent films in the early 20th century with husband Vernon; originated the Castle Walk and popularized the Foxtrot
- Dorothy Cotton – civil rights activist and close associate of Martin Luther King Jr.
- Peter Debye – physicist and Nobel Prize winner
- Richard Feynman – physicist and Nobel Prize winner
- Thomas Gold – astrophysicist and professor at Cornell University
- David Lee – physicist and Nobel Prize winner
- Vladimir Nabokov – author known for his 1955 novel Lolita, which ranked fourth on Modern Library's list of the 100 best novels
- Roy H. Park – entrepreneur and media mogul; founder of Park Communications and the Park Foundation
- Carl Sagan – astronomer, popularizer of science, Pulitzer Prize-winning author of The Dragons of Eden, and presenter of the Emmy Award-winning TV series Cosmos
- Kirkpatrick Sale – author who has written prolifically about political decentralism, environmentalism, luddism, and technology
- Steven Strogatz – mathematician and professor at Cornell University
