= Three Falls State Park =

State park in New York, United States

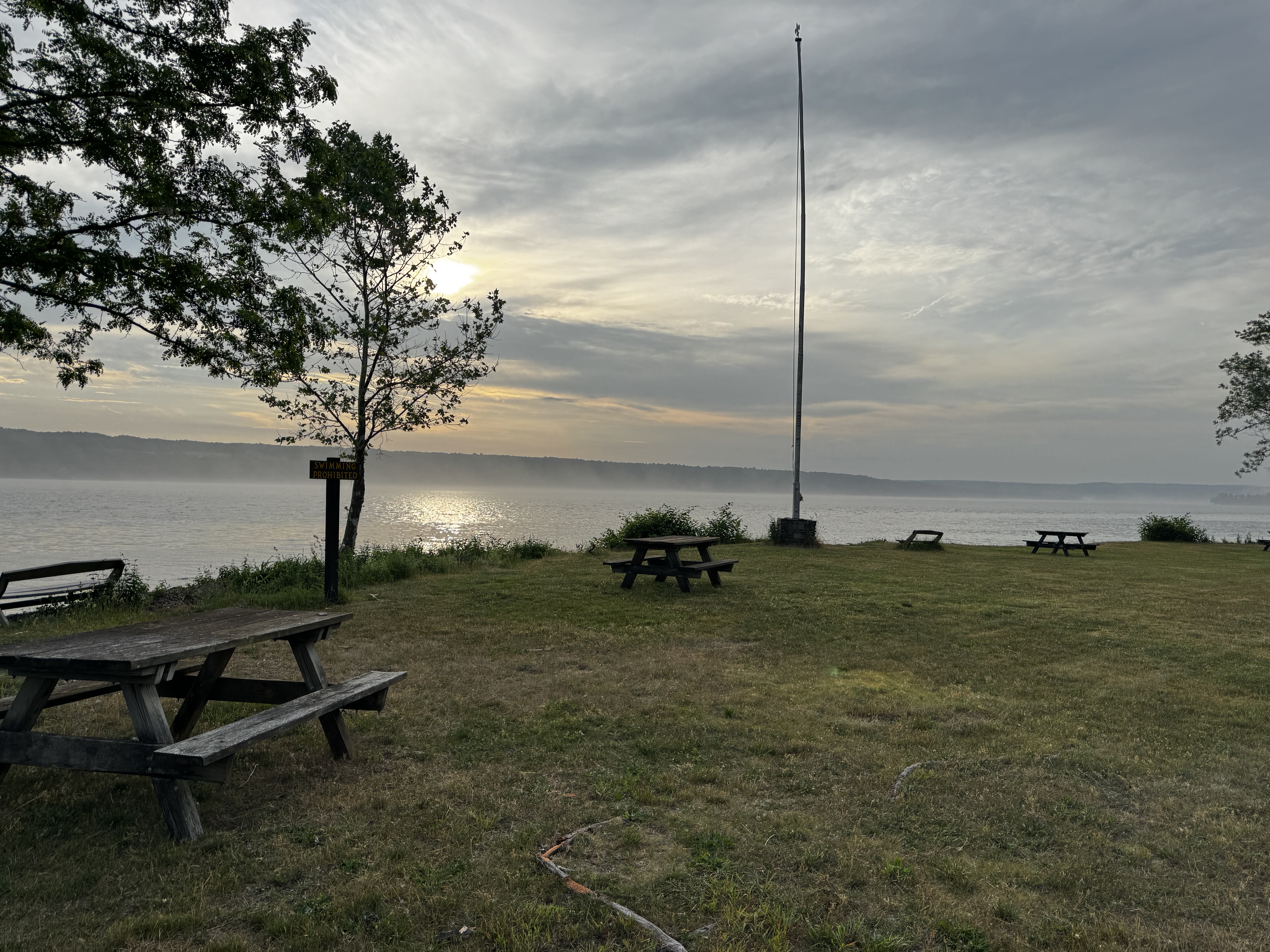
- Waterfront along Cayuga Lake

- Location within New York
- Type: State park
- Nearest city: Ithaca, New York
- Coordinates: 42°33′25″N 76°37′30″W
- Area: 90 acres (0.36 km^{2})
- Created: 2026
- Operator: New York State Office of Parks, Recreation and Historic Preservation

Three Falls State Park is a 90-acre (0.36 km^{2}) New York state park that opened in 2026. It contains three waterfalls and approximately .5 miles (0.80 km) of shoreline on Cayuga Lake.

In the 19th century, the land, centered around Frog Point (later known as Frontenac Point), was the site of a ferry across the lake and a trading community. In the 1920s, the land was purchased by the Baden-Powell Council of the Boy Scouts of America, who operated it as Camp Barton from 1928 to the 21st century. The council sold the camp to the state in 2025 to fund settlements over sex abuse cases filed against the BSA.

== Geography ==
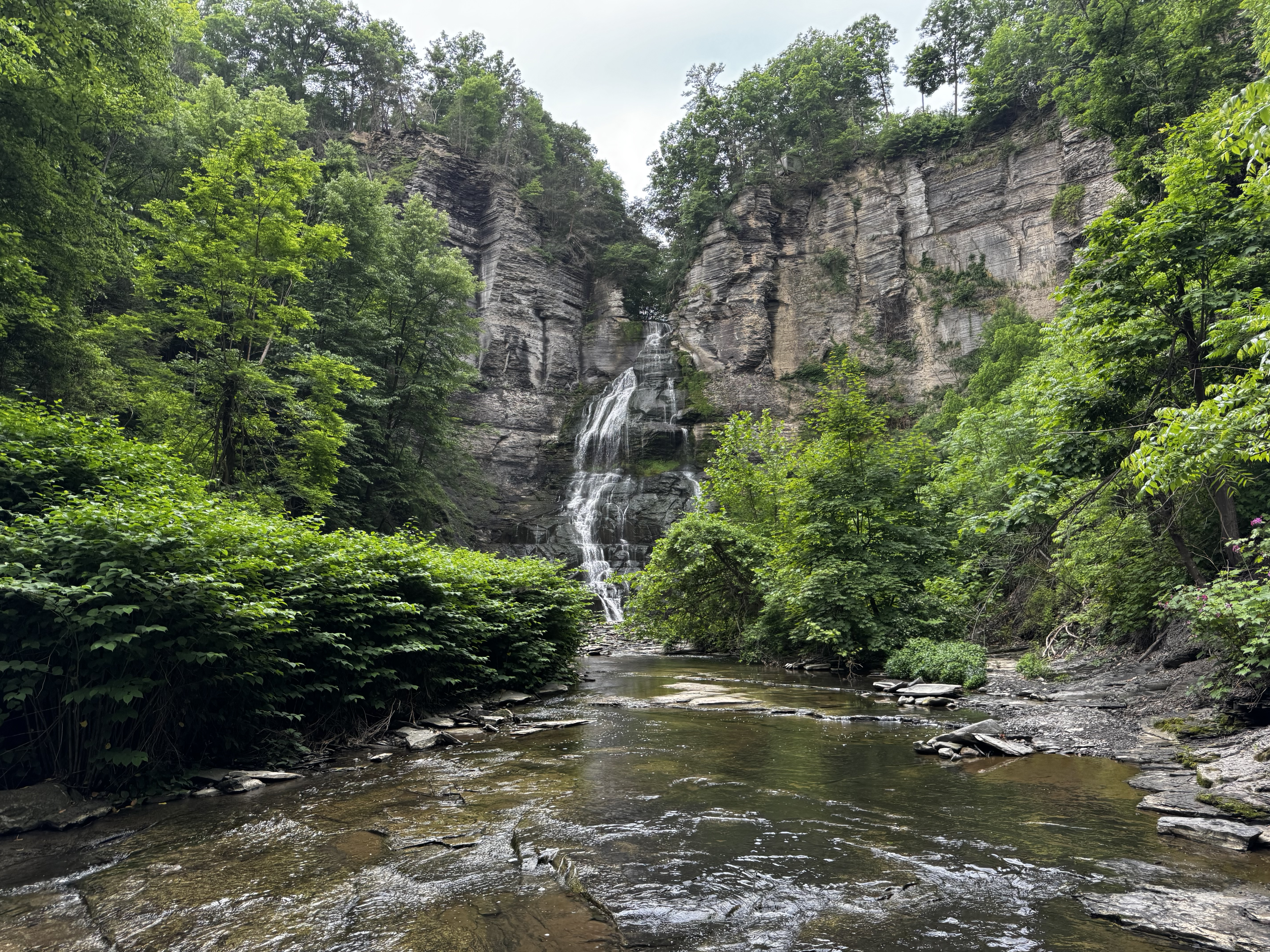
The Lower Frontenac Falls

The park contains three waterfalls that are formed by Trumansburg Creek, including the 128-foot (39 m) Frontenac Falls, and approximately .5 miles (0.80 km) of shoreline on Cayuga Lake. It is north of Taughannock Falls State Park, and near the towns of Trumansburg, Covert, and Ulysses.

== History ==
Frog Point (also known as Port Deposit and Trumansburg Landing) was the landing site of a ferry that went across Cayuga Lake to Lansing as early as 1829. During that century, Frog Point grew into a small community centered around trading. A hotel was built on the site c. 1870. In 1887, new proprietors changed the hotel's name to Hotel Frontenac, and the point became known as Frontenac Point. The community declined towards the end of the century after expansion of the Lehigh Valley Railroad rendered steamboat traffic across the lake obsolete, and in the 1920s the area was purchased for usage by the Boy Scouts of America (BSA).

=== Camp Barton ===
Camp Barton was opened in 1922 by a local council of the BSA at Taughannock Point on Cayuga Lake. It was named after Frank Barton, a colonel in the US military who worked at nearby Cornell University. After several years New York state took over this land to form Taughannock Falls State Park, forcing the BSA to move the camp. By 1927, the camp moved to Frontenac Point, and within a few years the council had built a council ring and dining hall and converted the old hotel building into their headquarters. The camp was active into the 21st century. By then, the tract was 129.8 acres (52.5 ha) and owned by the Baden-Powell Council.

As early as 2002, the Baden-Powell Council was considering selling the camp, which was still in use by local scouts, to address financial difficulties. Instead, in 2003 they opted to open the camp to reservation by non-scouting parties, and non-local scouts. In 2007 The Ithaca Journal reported that the camp was thriving.

During the COVID-19 pandemic the camp saw declines in enrollment.

=== Sale ===
The council was forced to place Camp Barton for sale in 2021 to fund settlements over sex abuse cases filed against the BSA. In 2022, 40 acres (16 ha) of the camp were sold to a family. As early as January 2023, New York state entered into discussions with the Baden-Powell Council to buy the rest of the camp. The purchase was finalized two years later, and the state purchased 90 acres (36 ha) of the land for $5 million.

The land was dedicated as Three Falls State Park on March 9, 2026. It is run by New York state in partnership with a local development corporation, which is in turn managed by the local towns of Trumansburg, Covert, and Ulysses. Upon the park's dedication, the state announced plans for future development of the land, which it estimated could take up to 15 years.
