= Canoga Creek =

Location
- Country: United States
- State: New York

Physical characteristics
- Mouth: Cayuga Lake
  - location: Canoga, New York, United States
  - coordinates: 42°51′54″N 76°44′11″W
- Basin size: 5.85 mi^{2} (15.2 km^{2})

Canoga Creek is a river located in Seneca County, New York. It flows into Cayuga Lake through the Canoga Marsh, by Canoga, New York.

== Course and watershed ==
The creek's watershed is primarily agricultural.

== History ==
At various times in the 1940s and 1950s, the creek was stocked with fish including rainbow trout and brook trout. In 1958, the outdoors columnist Floyd King described it as considered "one of the best natural trout streams in [its] area"

As of 2026, the state Department of Environmental Conservation stocks the creek with trout.
