= Red Creek =

Red Creek may refer to:

- Red Creek, New York, a village
- Red Creek (New York), a tributary of Cayuga Lake in Seneca County
- Red Creek (Susquehanna River tributary), a creek in Otsego County, New York
- A tributary of the Dry Fork (Cheat River) in West Virginia
  - Red Creek, West Virginia, an unincorporated community named for it
- Red Creek (Mississippi), a tributary of the Pascagoula River
- Red Creek (Paragonah), a stream in Iron County, Utah
