= Bolton Point =

Bolton Point may refer to:

- Bolton Point, New South Wales
- Bolton Point (water system)
