= Dean Creek (Cayuga Lake tributary) =

River in New York State, USA

- Location of the mouth of Dean Creek Dean Creek (Cayuga Lake tributary) (the United States)

Location
- Country: United States
- State: New York
- County: Cayuga

Physical characteristics
- Mouth: Cayuga Lake
  - location: Aurora, Cayuga County, New York, United States
  - coordinates: 42°46′08″N 76°42′38″W
  - elevation: 381.9 ft (116.4 m)

Dean Creek is a river located in Cayuga County, New York, United States. It flows into Cayuga Lake north of Aurora, New York.
