= Yawger Creek =

Location
- Country: United States
- State: New York

Physical characteristics
- Mouth: Cayuga Lake
  - location: Cayuga, New York, United States
  - coordinates: 42°53′09″N 76°42′31″W
- Basin size: 24.9 sq mi (64 km^{2})

Yawger Creek is a river located in Cayuga County, New York. It flows into Cayuga Lake south of Cayuga, New York.
