= Groves Creek =

Location
- Country: United States
- State: New York

Physical characteristics
- Mouth: Cayuga Lake
  - location: Weyers Point, New York, United States
  - coordinates: 42.68015°N 76.72267°W

Basin features
- Tributaries
  - right: Powell Creek

Groves Creek is a river located in Seneca County, New York. It flows into Cayuga Lake by Weyers Point, New York.

== Wyers Point Road Bridge ==
In July, 2025, it was announced that the town of Ovid, New York, received $2.535 million to replace a bridge on Wyers Point Road over Groves Creek. The bridge was significantly deteriorated and in need of full replacement. Replacement bridge construction is scheduled to begin in May, 2026 and conclude in September, 2026.
