= Peter Whitmer log home =

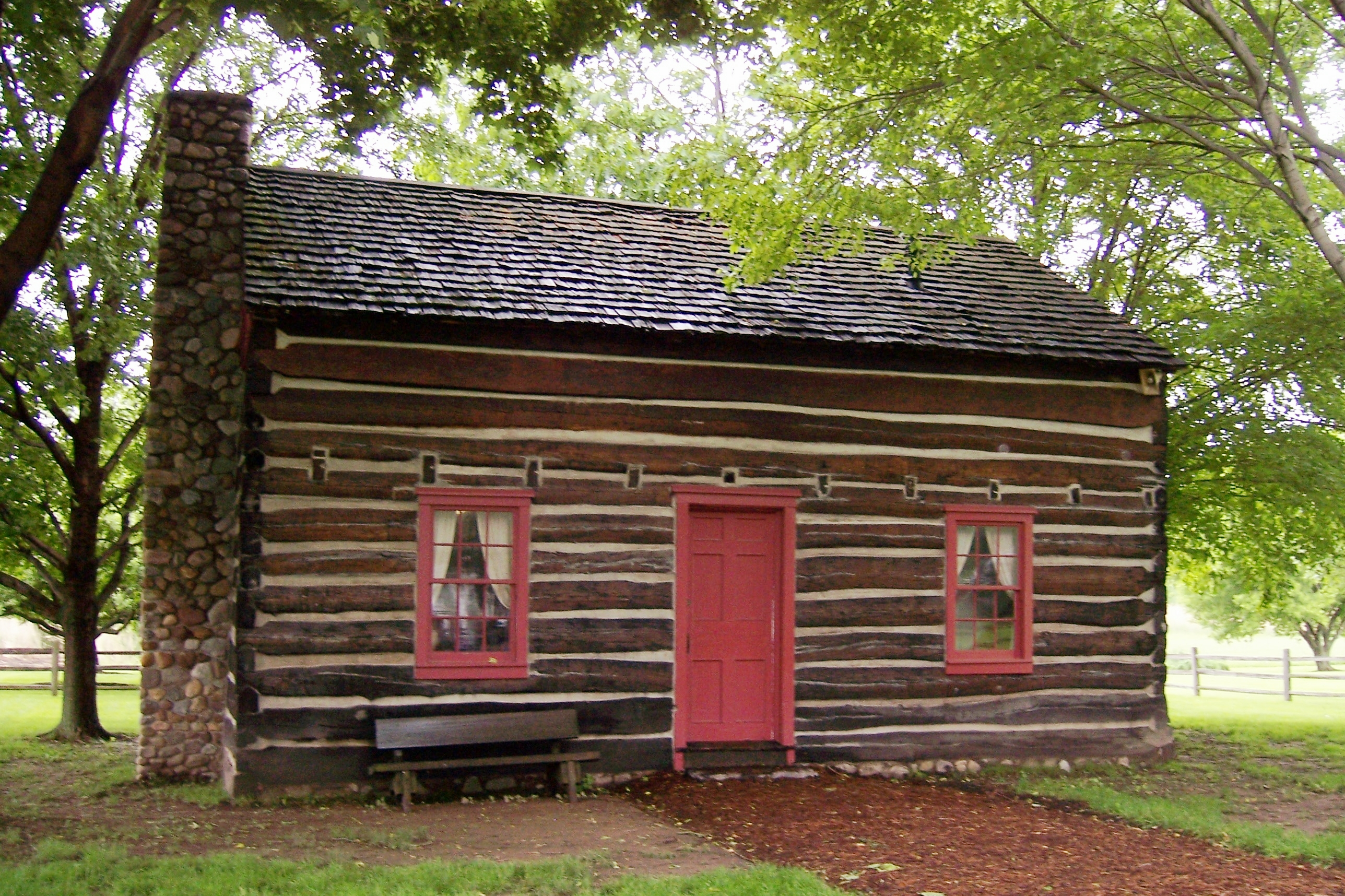
- Replica of a cabin at the Peter Whitmer Farm

- Location within New York

General information
- Location: Fayette, New York, United States
- Coordinates: 42°51′57.5″N 76°52′11.2″W

The Peter Whitmer log home is a historic site located in Fayette, New York, United States, owned and operated by the Church of Jesus Christ of Latter-day Saints (LDS Church). The current house is a replica of the original log cabin and at its original site, and was built in 1980 to mark the sesquicentennial of the founding of the church. In the early 19th century, it was the home of Peter Whitmer Sr., his wife Mary Musselman Whitmer, and their eight children: Christian, Jacob, John, David, Catherine, Peter Jr., Nancy, and Elizabeth Ann, who lived on the property from 1809 to 1830. The house is prominent in the early history of the Latter Day Saint movement as the traditional location of the formal organization of the Church of Christ, the original name of the church founded by Joseph Smith on April 6, 1830. The home is also near the site where the Three Witnesses were shown the golden plates by the Angel Moroni in 1829. Joseph Smith and his wife Emma lived in the home with the Whitmers for six months in 1829, with a large part of the Book of Mormon being translated during that time. The house and adjacent visitor center are open year-round for public tours.

== Modern recreation ==
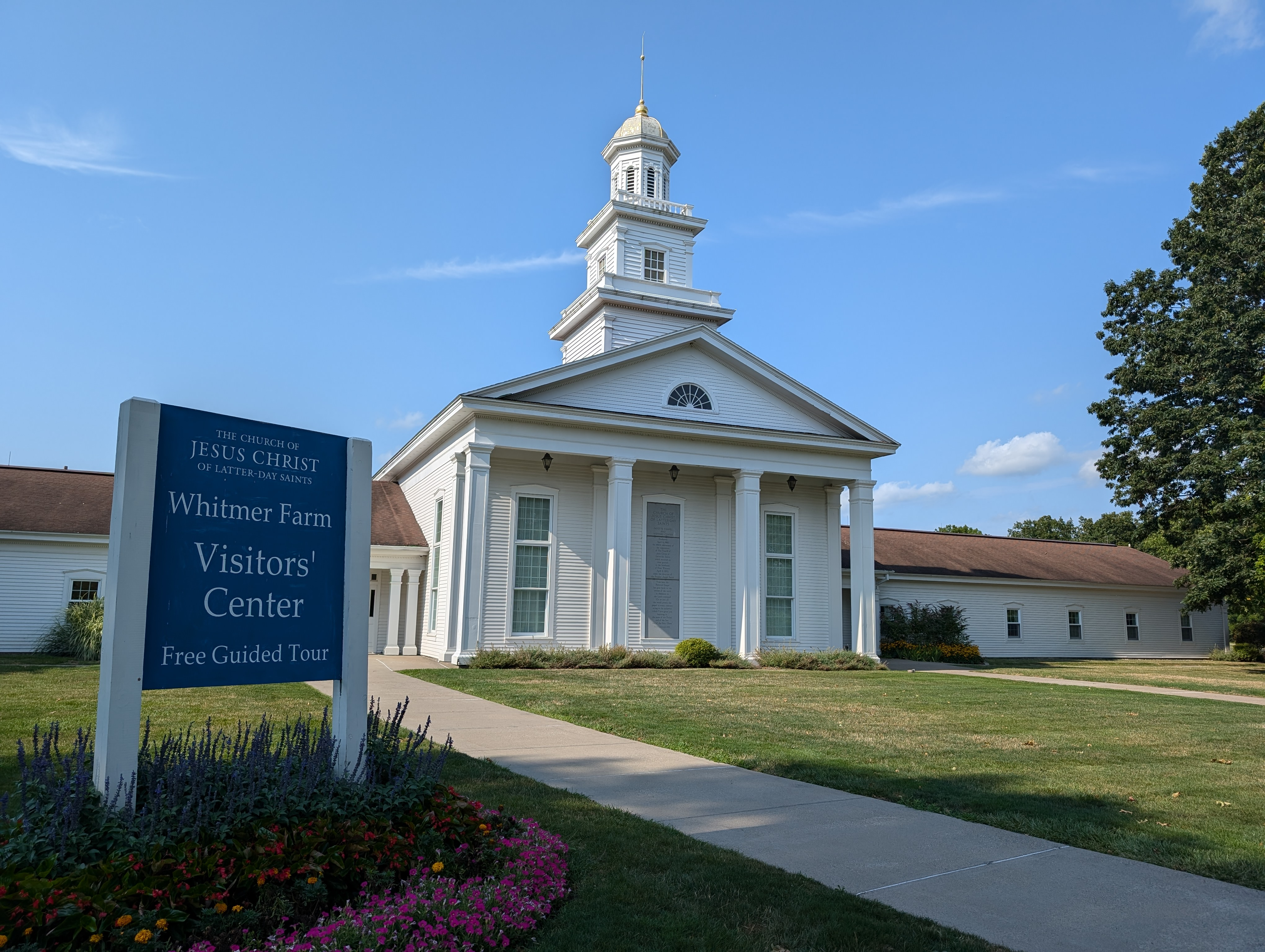
Visitors Center

The site is located in rural Seneca County in the Finger Lakes region of New York. It is in the town of Fayette, south of the village of Waterloo and southeast of the city of Geneva. The property was purchased by the LDS Church in 1926, and the location of the original home was determined in 1947. The current structure is a replica dedicated on April 6, 1980, in a special general conference broadcast, which also saw the dedication of the adjacent LDS Church meetinghouse and visitor center.
