= Gulf Creek =

Location
- Country: United States
- State: New York

Physical characteristics
- Mouth: Cayuga Lake
  - location: Asbury, New York, United States
  - coordinates: 42°31′33″N 76°31′39″W
- Basin size: 6.53 mi^{2} (16.9 km^{2})

Gulf Creek is a river located in Tompkins County, New York. It flows into Cayuga Lake by Asbury, New York.
