= Willow Creek (New York) =

Location
- Country: United States
- State: New York

Physical characteristics
- Mouth: Cayuga Lake
  - location: Willow Creek, New York, United States
  - coordinates: 42°31′50″N 76°34′06″W
- Basin size: 3.33 sq mi (8.6 km^{2})

Willow Creek is a river located in Tompkins County, New York. It flows into Cayuga Lake east of Willow Creek, New York.
