= Christ Evangelical and Reformed Church =

Historic church in New York, United States

- U.S. National Register of Historic Places
- Location within New York Location within the United States
- Location: Main St., Fayette, New York
- Coordinates: 42°48′52″N 76°47′51″W
- Area: 1 acre (0.40 ha)
- Built: 1810
- Architect: Frantz, Stephen
- Architectural style: Queen Anne, Federal
- NRHP reference No.: 89002092
- Added to NRHP: December 08, 1989

Christ Evangelical and Reformed Church, also known as United Church of Fayette, is a historic Evangelical and Reformed church located at Fayette in Seneca County, New York. It was constructed in 1823 in a simple rectangular form with gable roof and modest Federal period detailing. It was updated and its Romanesque qualities enhanced in 1882 with the addition of a four-stage bell tower with Queen Anne decoration. The adjacent cemetery was in use between 1810 and 1926, and the surrounding cast-iron fence was installed in 1877.

It was listed on the National Register of Historic Places in 1989.
