= Little Creek (New York) =

Location
- Country: United States
- State: New York

Physical characteristics
- Mouth: Cayuga Lake
  - location: Aurora, Cayuga County, New York, United States
  - coordinates: 42°44′24″N 76°42′08″W
- Basin size: 3.20 mi^{2} (8.3 km^{2})

Little Creek is a river located in Cayuga County, New York. There is an associated waterfall. It flows into Cayuga Lake by Aurora, New York.
