= Indian Creek (New York) =

Location
- Country: United States
- State: New York

Physical characteristics
- Mouth: Cayuga Lake
  - location: Ithaca, New York, United States
  - coordinates: 42°28′37″N 76°31′51″W
- Basin size: .66 mi^{2} (1.7 km^{2})

Indian Creek is a river located in Tompkins County, New York. It flows into Cayuga Lake northwest of Ithaca, New York.
