= Walter Lynn =

American civil engineer (1928–2011)

Walter Royal Lynn (born Valdimir [sic] Royal Lynn; 1 October 1928 – 6 June 2011) was a distinguished professor at Cornell University for most of his academic career. As a civil engineer he was interested in water-quality issues, he was at the forefront of environmental studies. According to one obituary, he coined the term "sustainability."

Born in New York City and raised in Florida, Lynn earned a B.S. in civil engineering at University of Miami (1950), M.S. in sanitary engineering at University of North Carolina (1954), and a PhD at Northwestern University (1963). He joined the Cornell faculty in 1961.

At Cornell, Lynn was the founder and director of Cornell's Center for Environmental Quality Management (1966–1976). He was also Director of the School of Civil and Environmental Engineering (1970–1978), director of the Center for the Environment (1996–1997), and director of the Science, Technology & Society program (1980–1988). He was an elected faculty member of the Cornell Board of Trustees (1980–1985) and Dean of the Faculty (1988–1993). After retiring, he served as Ombudsman of the university (approx. 1999-2011).

Lynn was also active on many government committees, at local, state, and national levels. He was Mayor of the village of Cayuga Heights from 2002 to 2008.

Obituaries for Lynn appeared in the Ithaca Journal, Cornell Daily Sun, and Cornell Chronicle.
