= Trumansburg Creek =

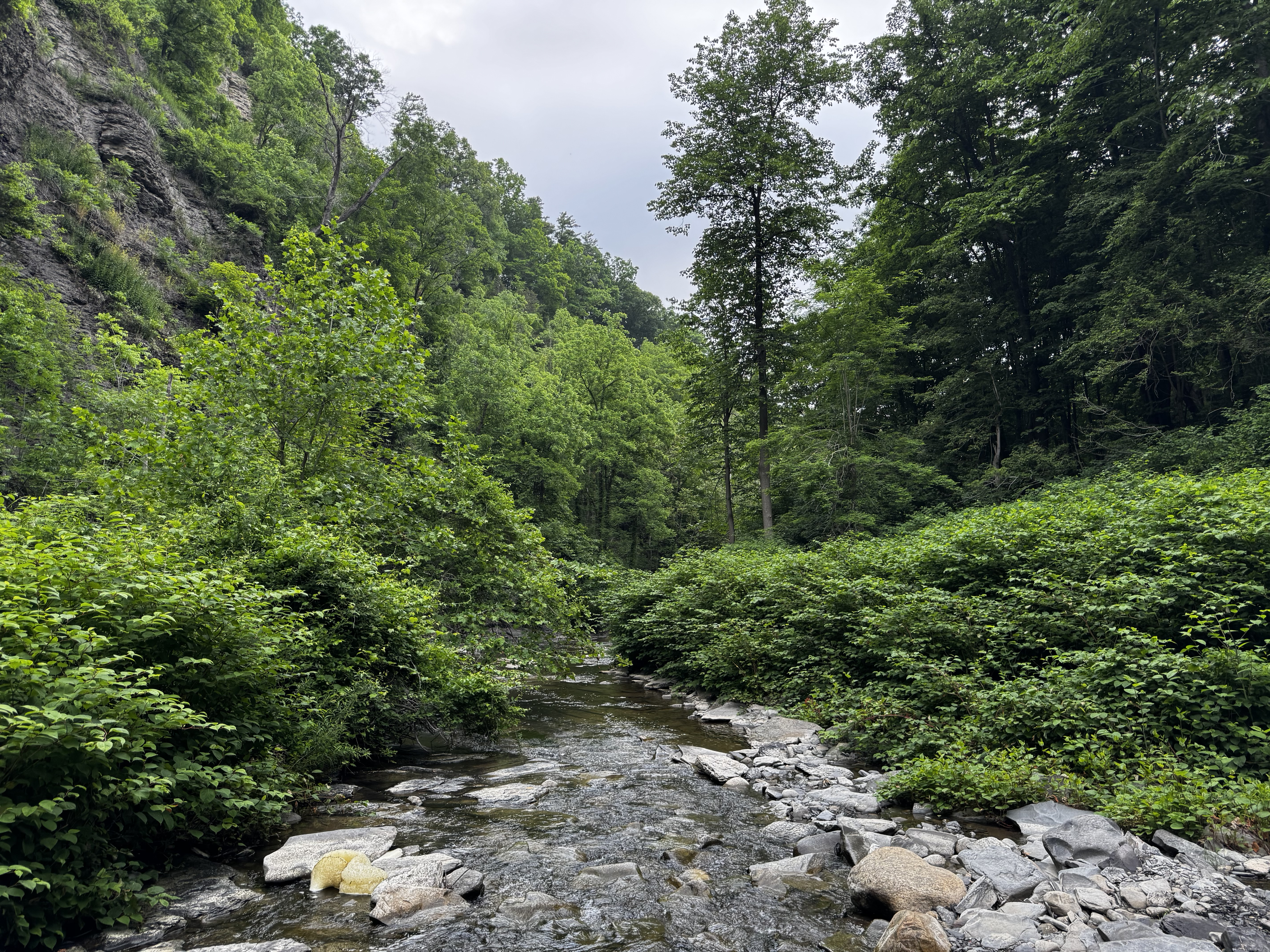
- Flowing through Three Falls State Park

Location
- Country: United States
- State: New York

Physical characteristics
- Mouth: Cayuga Lake
  - location: Trumansburg, New York, United States
  - coordinates: 42°33′30″N 76°37′37″W
- Basin size: 13.5 mi^{2} (35 km^{2})

Trumansburg Creek is a river located in Seneca, Schuyler, and Tompkins counties in New York. It flows into Cayuga Lake by Trumansburg, New York. The last portion of the creek flows through Three Falls State Park and over the 128-foot (39 m) Frontenac Falls.

The creek has a drainage basin of 13.5 square miles (35 km^{2}). Researchers in 1977 described the land as "mostly agricultural", and in 2012 that was the estimated usage of 59.8% of the land.

Prior to European arrival in the region, the Trumansburg Creek watershed was inhabited by the Cayuga people. Artifacts have been found that suggest it was inhabited by hunter-gatherers as early as the Early Archaic period and into the Late Woodland period. Kurt Jordan, a professor of American Indian Studies at Cornell University, theorized that the creek may have functioned as a transportation corridor. In the 19th century, European settlers built several mills on the creek, and the community of Trumansburg grew up around it. In the 1960s a wastewater treatment plant for Trumansburg was built that discharged water into the creek. It was upgraded in the 1990s, and again in the 2010s. The second upgrade came after multiple overflows resulted in untreated sewage being dumped into the creek.
