= Taughannock Falls State Park =

State park in New York state, United States

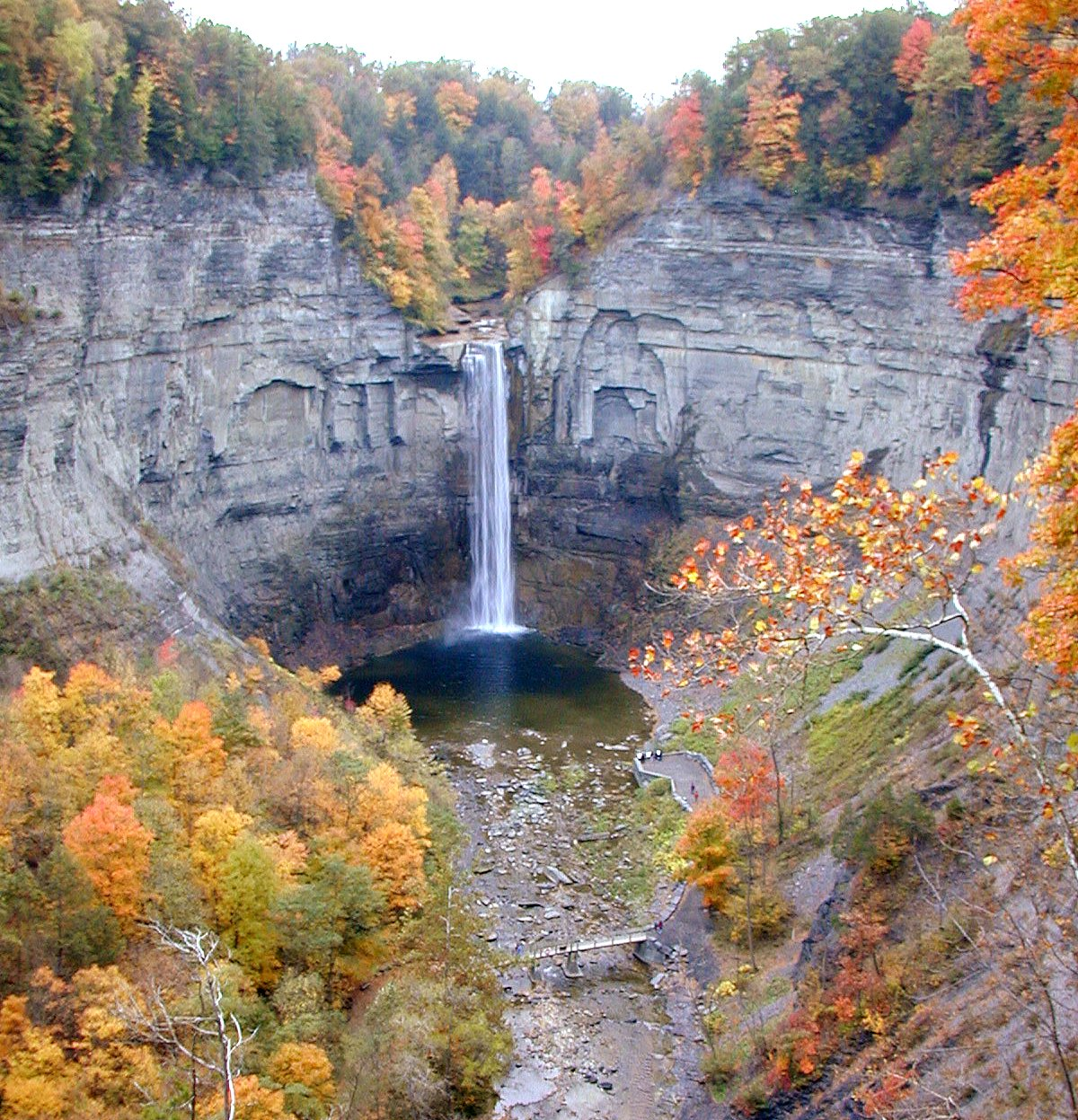
- Taughannock Falls in Autumn 2003

- Location within New York
- Type: State park
- Location: 1740 Taughannock Blvd. Trumansburg, New York
- Nearest city: Trumansburg, New York
- Coordinates: 42°32′42″N 76°36′22″W
- Area: 750 acres (3.0 km^{2})
- Created: 1925
- Operator: New York State Office of Parks, Recreation and Historic Preservation
- Visitors: 914,515 (in 2025)
- Open: All year
- Website: Taughannock Falls State Park

Taughannock Falls State Park (/təˈɡænək/ tə-GAN-ək) is a 750-acre (3.0 km^{2}) state park located in the town of Ulysses in Tompkins County, New York in the United States. The park is northwest of Ithaca near Trumansburg.

The park's namesake, Taughannock Falls, is a 215-foot (66 m) plunge waterfall.

== History ==
The region surrounding Taughannock Falls State Park was home to the Cayuga people prior to their displacement from the area during the Clinton-Sullivan Campaign following the American Revolutionary War. Taughannock Creek was used as a source of power for mills and a gun factory in the early 19th century.

=== Tourism ===
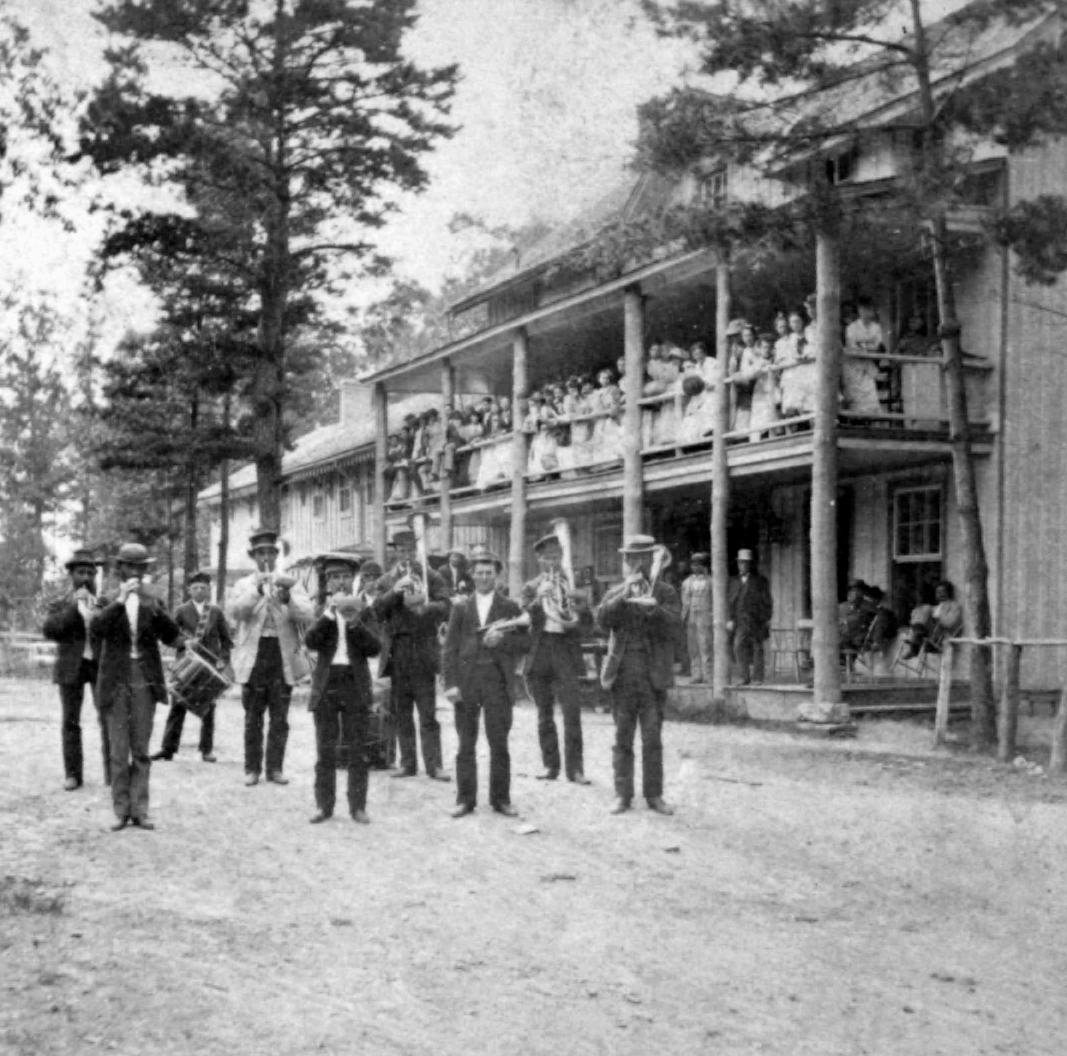
Taughannock House Hotel

During the second half of the nineteenth century, steamboats, railroads and Victorian hotels were built in the region to serve tourists who traveled to view the falls. By 1925 the hotels were failing due to a decline in tourism, and New York State began acquiring land to form a park.

J.S. Halsey built a two and a half story hotel in 1850, known variously as the Cataract Hotel or Taughannock House (or simply as Halsey's Hotel) at the Taughannock Falls Overlook. Visitors could reach the hotel by taking a train to Cayuga Lake, a steamboat across the lake to Goodwin's Point, and finally a stagecoach to the hotel. The hotel site today is the location of the park visitor center and parking lot.

==== The Taughannock Giant ====
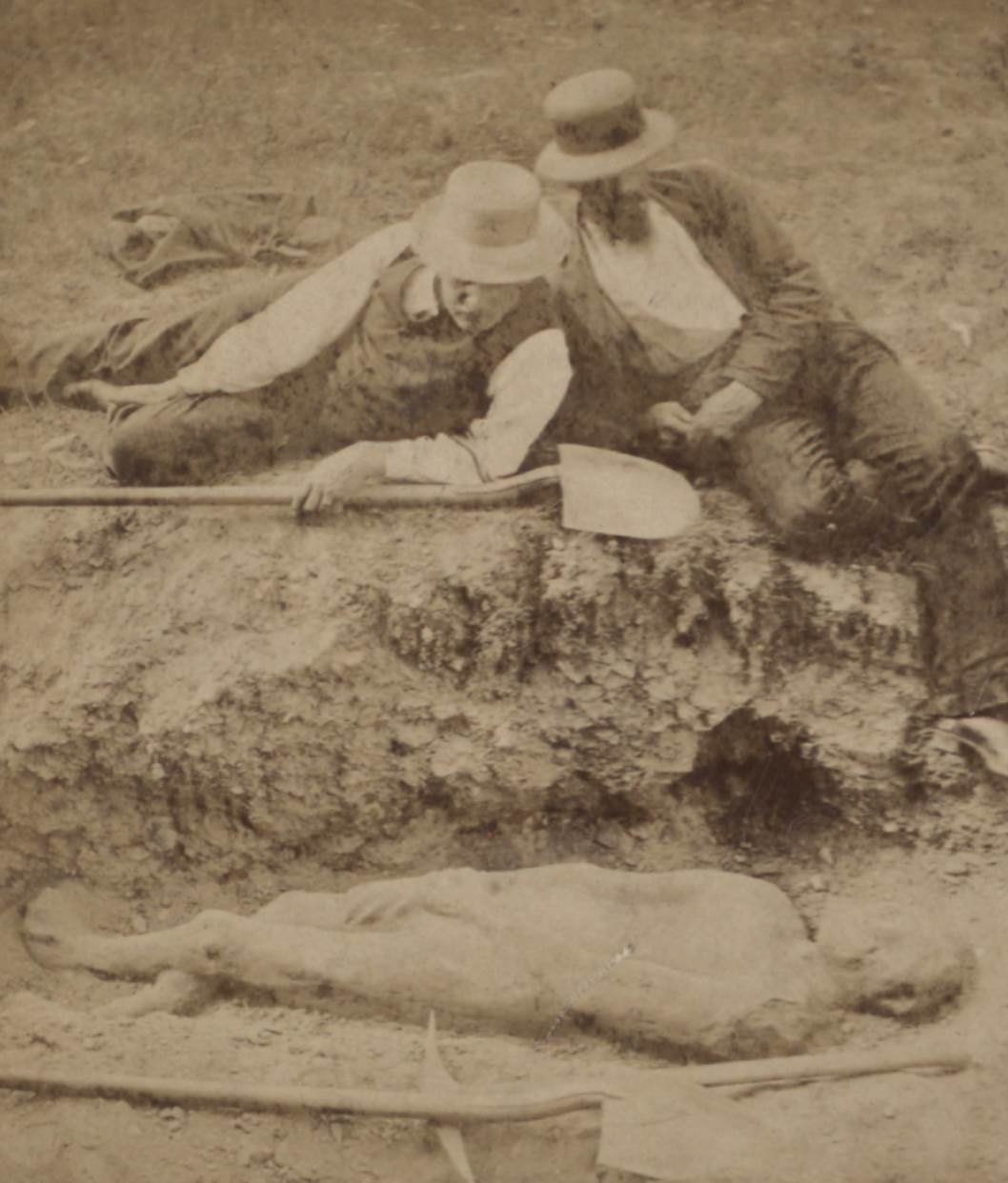
Workmen pose with the "Taughannock Giant"

On July 2, 1879, workmen widening a carriage road near the Taughannock House Hotel uncovered what appeared to be the petrified body of a seven-foot-tall man. Newspapers reported on the find, and Cornell University scientists removed parts of the body for examination. Over 5,000 people paid a small admission fee to view the 800-pound "giant." Before long, the figure was revealed to be a hoax created by the hotel's owner, John Thompson, and two associates. The idea for the hoax had been inspired by the Cardiff Giant, a similar "discovery" in nearby Cardiff, New York, in 1869. Although the original giant has been damaged and lost, a replica was constructed for the Tompkins Center for History & Culture by local artists in 2019.

An earlier publicity stunt masterminded by Thompson in 1874 involved hiring Canadian acrobat "Professor Jenkins" to cross a 1,200-foot-long tightrope suspended 350 feet above the creek. He was reported to have crossed twice over two days, at least one of those times while blindfolded and wearing "Chinese wooden shoes." Jenkins had previously crossed Niagara Falls gorge.

=== State park ===
Taughannock Falls State Park was created in 1925 on a 64-acre (0.26 km^{2}) parcel of land acquired by New York State. Roads and trails at the park were improved by the Works Progress Administration in the 1930s. The park has since grown to its current size of 750 acres (3.0 km^{2}).

=== Origin of name ===
Several possible sources have been proposed for the name Taughannock, all of which describe Native American origins. One translation suggests that the name is derived from a combination of Iroquois and Algonquin terms meaning "great fall in the woods". An alternate theory suggests that the name may refer to a Lenni Lenape (Delaware) chief named Taughannock who died near the falls during a battle.

== Park description ==
Taughannock Falls State Park offers hiking and nature trails, camping and picnicking. The park includes a stretch of Cayuga Lake's shoreline, where swimming, fishing, and a boat launch are available. In the winter, the park offers facilities and trails for ice-skating, sledding, and cross-country skiing.

In addition to the 215-foot (66 m) Taughannock Falls, two additional waterfalls are located along Taughannock Creek within the park. A 20-foot (6.1 m) cascade, known as Little or Lower Falls, is located downstream of Taughannock Falls, while the 100-foot (30 m) Upper Falls are found upstream of Taughannock Falls.

Views of Taughannock Falls are available from two trails. The 0.75-mile-long (1.21 km) Gorge Trail leads to a viewing area at the base of the falls and also passes by Lower Falls. The 1.5-mile (2.4 km) North Rim Trail and 1.2-mile (1.9 km) South Rim Trail can be connected to form a loop hike which offers views of Upper Falls.

The Gorge Trail is open all year long, unlike the Rim Trails which are closed to the public in winter. Swimming under the waterfall is hazardous and strictly forbidden.

Video of the Falls.

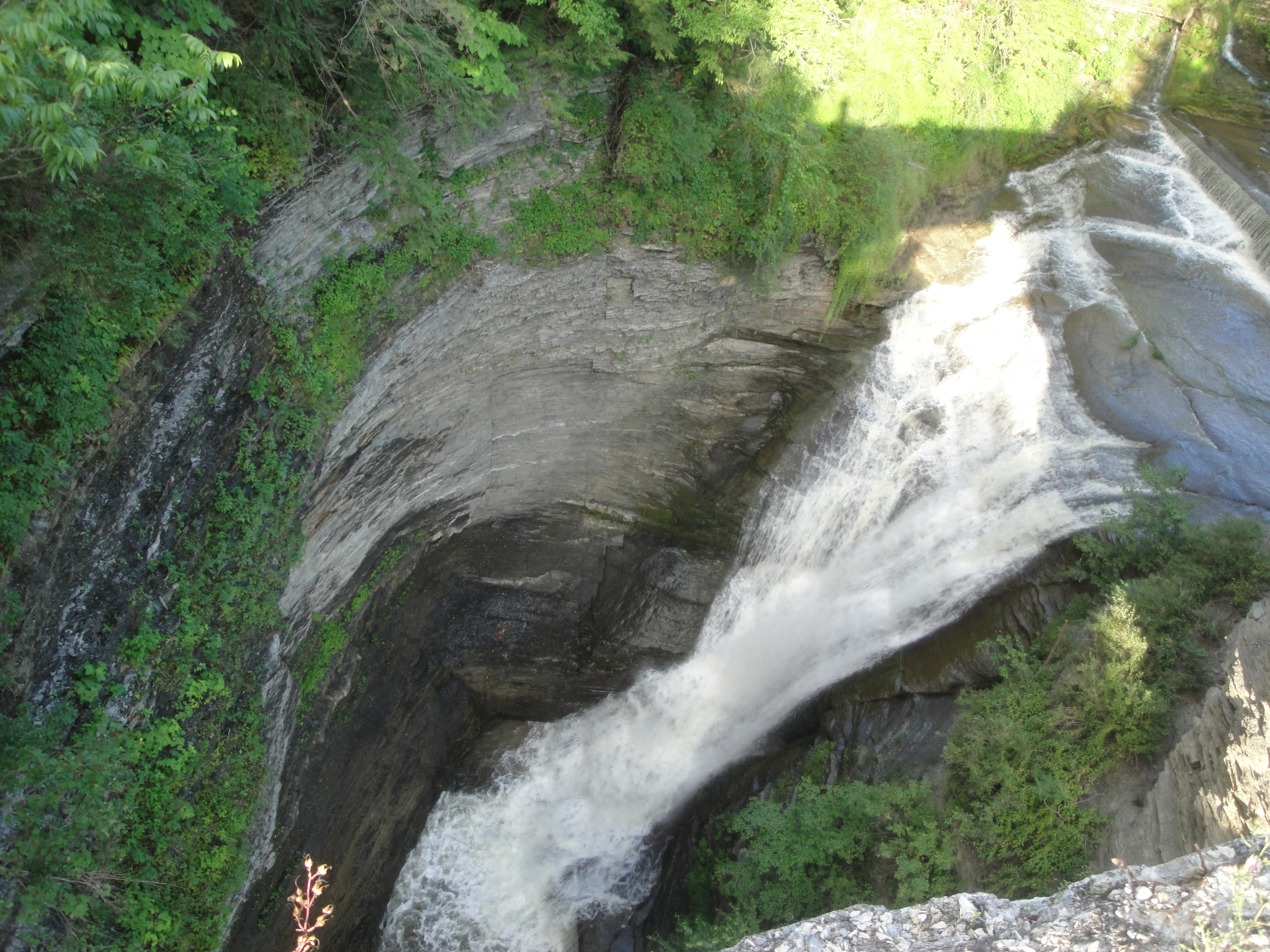
Upper Tuaghannock Falls.

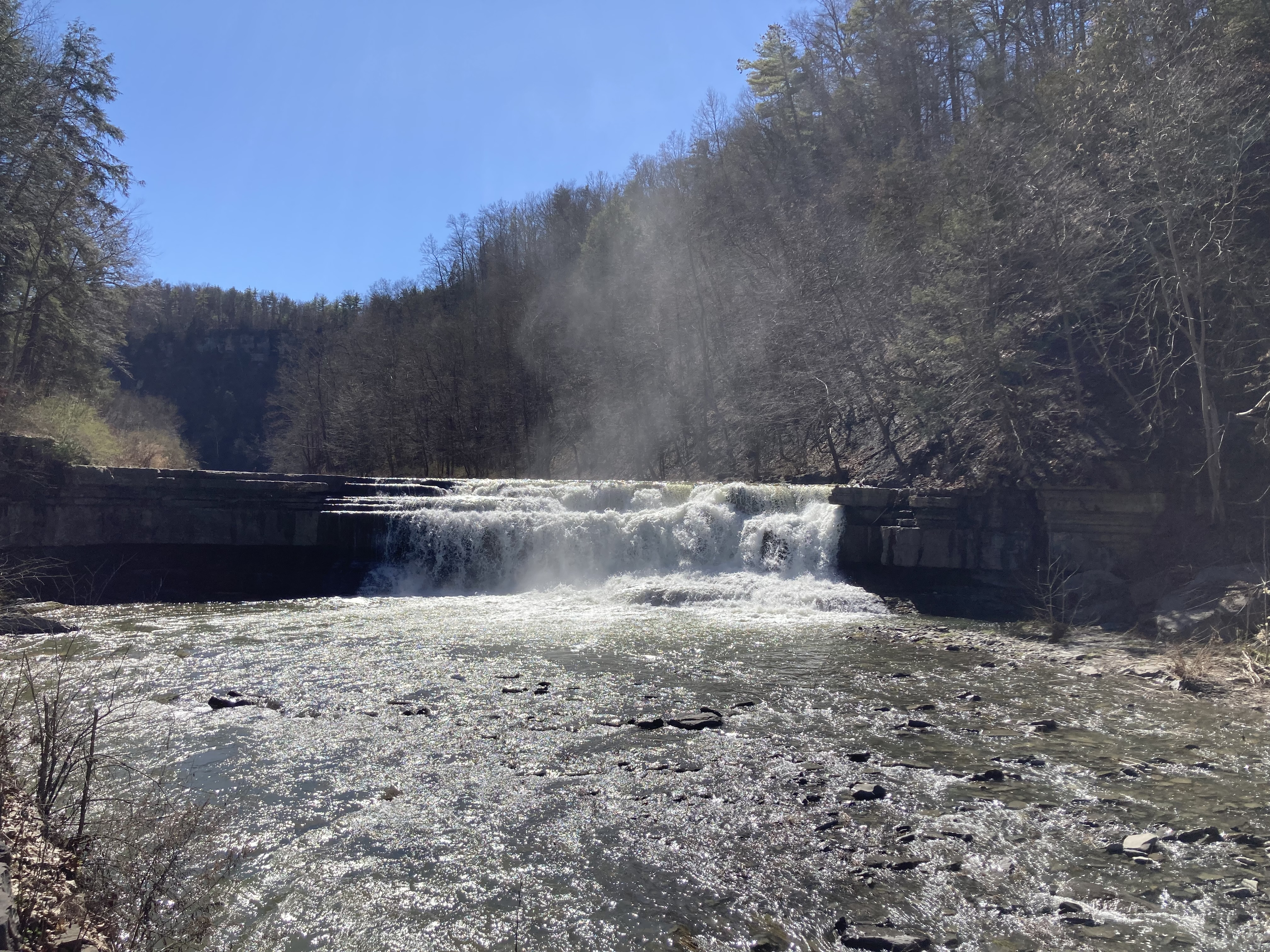
Lower Taughannock Falls.

== Taughannock Falls ==
Taughannock Falls
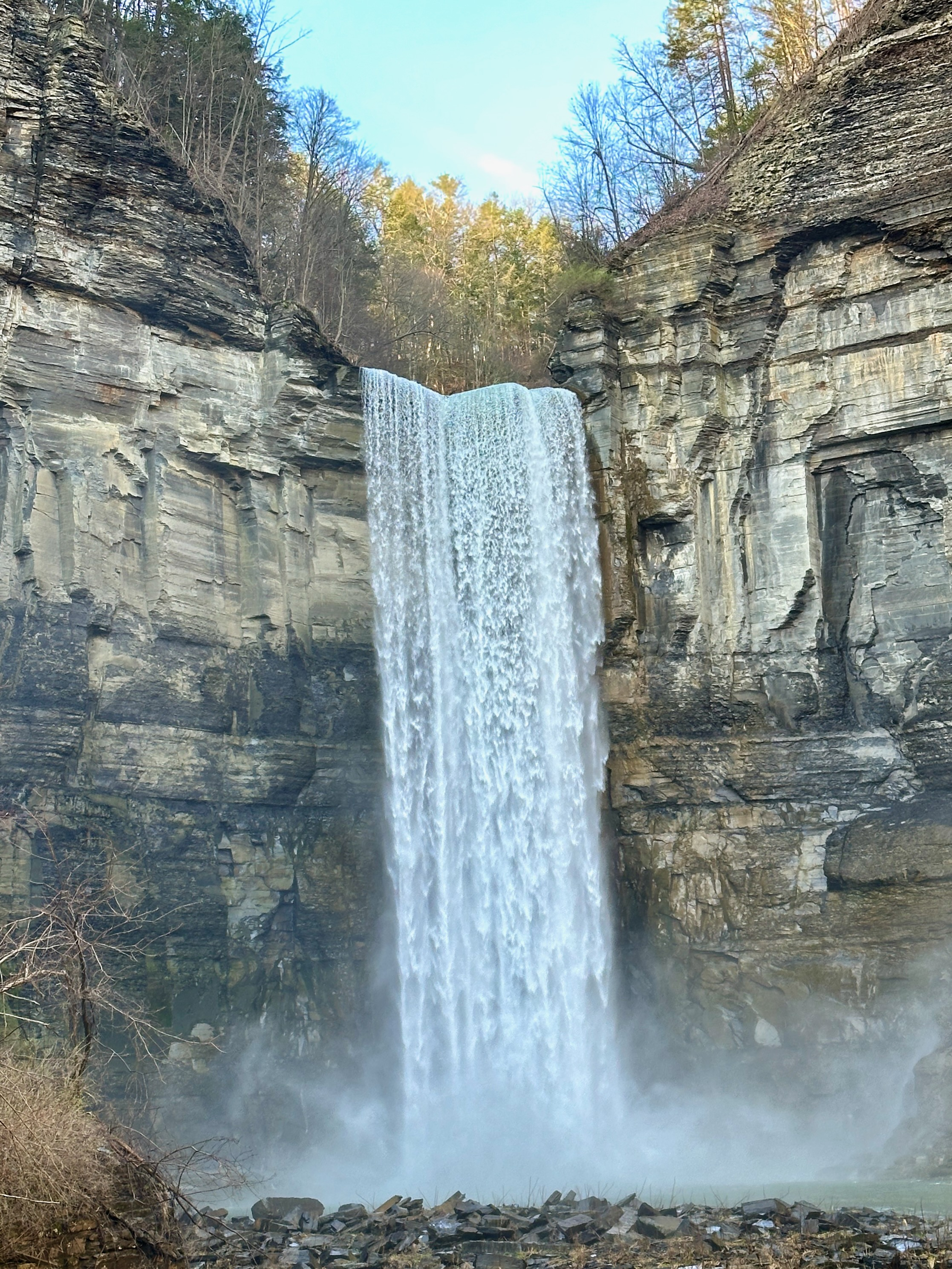
- Taughannock Falls in spring 2024
- Location: Tompkins County, New York
- Coordinates: 42°32′08″N 76°36′39″W
- Type: Plunge
- Total height: 215 ft (66 m)
- Number of drops: 1
- Watercourse: Taughannock Creek

Taughannock Falls' main cataract is a 215-foot drop (66 m), making it 33 feet (10 m) taller than Niagara Falls. The waterfall is located along Taughannock Creek, which flows through a long gorge with cliffs up to 400 feet (120 m) high.

=== Geology and natural history ===
The waterfall and gorge comprise an example of a hanging valley, formed where Taughannock Creek's stream-carved valley meets the deeper glacially carved valley that contains Cayuga Lake. The gorge has continued to retreat westward from Cayuga Lake as easily eroded shale near the fall's base is worn away by the stream, which supports erosion-resistant siltstone and sandstone found in the upper portions of the gorge. Annual freeze and thaw cycles also act upon small faults in the rock, causing large sections to occasionally break away, further expanding the gorge.

The gorge supports a "Shale Cliff and Talus" community of plants, including three regionally rare species classified as threatened in New York State: Butterwort (Pinguicula vulgaris), birds-eye primrose (Primula mistassinica) and yellow mountain saxifrage (Saxifraga aizoides).

== Events ==
The park hosts numerous events throughout the year. A Summer Concert Series provides an outdoor venue for local bands. Concerts start at 7 p.m. on Saturday nights in July and August.

The Cayuga Lake Triathlon uses the park for a swimming, biking and running event in early August. In 2008, the race served as the USA Triathlon Sprint National Championship.

== See also ==
- Three Falls State Park
- List of New York state parks
- List of waterfalls of New York
- List of waterfalls
