= Lively Run =

Location
- Country: United States
- State: New York

Physical characteristics
- Mouth: Cayuga Lake
  - location: Interlaken Beach, New York, United States
  - coordinates: 42°37′48″N 76°41′17″W
- Basin size: 1.97 mi^{2} (5.1 km^{2})

Lively Run is a river located in Seneca County, New York. It flows into Cayuga Lake by Interlaken Beach, New York.
