= Barnum Creek =

Location
- Country: United States
- State: New York

Physical characteristics
- Mouth: Cayuga Lake
  - location: Elm Beach, New York, United States
  - coordinates: 42°41′16″N 76°43′58″W
- Basin size: 1.67 mi^{2} (4.3 km^{2})

Barnum Creek is a river located in Seneca County, New York. It flows into Cayuga Lake south of Elm Beach, New York.
