= Fayette, New York =

- Town
- Location within the state of New York
- Coordinates: 42°51′N 76°52′W
- Country: United States
- State: New York
- County: Seneca
- Settled: 1790
- Established: March 14, 1800

Government
  - Type: Town Board
  - Supervisor: Jeffrey Trout
  - Clerk: Macy Nesbit
  - Court: Justice Duane Riegel

Area
  - Total: 66.40 sq mi (171.98 km^{2})
  - Land: 54.82 sq mi (141.98 km^{2})
  - Water: 11.58 sq mi (30.00 km^{2})
- Elevation: 574 ft (175 m)

Population (2020)
  - Total: 3,617 ▼
  - Estimate (2021): 3,602
  - Density: 70.7/sq mi (27.28/km^{2})
- Time zone: UTC-5 (Eastern (EST))
  - Summer (DST): UTC-4 (EDT)
- ZIP code: 13065
- Area codes: 315 and 680
- FIPS code: 36-25505
- GNIS feature ID: 0978954
- Website: https://townoffayetteny.gov/

Fayette is a town in Seneca County, New York, United States. The population was 3,617 at the 2020 census. The town is in the north-central part of the county and is southeast of Geneva, New York.

A post office is located in the Town of Fayette although the area is covered by four postal districts. Only the immediate hamlet of Fayette uses a ZIP Code of 13065 for Fayette. Addresses in the eastern section have a ZIP Code of 13148 for Seneca Falls. The central section of the town has a ZIP Code of 13165 for Waterloo, while addresses in the western section have a ZIP Code of 14456 for Geneva.

== History ==
Seneca was part of the Central New York Military Tract and was first settled around 1790.

The town was established from part of the Town of Romulus in 1800 as the "Town of Washington", but adopted the current name in 1808.

In Fayette on April 6, 1830, Joseph Smith, who was from nearby Palmyra, New York, organized the Church of Christ in a log home owned by Peter Whitmer Sr. Whitmer and four others besides Smith were the initial six members of the Latter Day Saint movement started by Smith, with the largest denomination in the movement later being known as the Church of Jesus Christ of Latter-day Saints (LDS Church).

In 1980, this reconstructed log home, built on the site of the original Whitmer home, was dedicated as part of the LDS Church's sesquicentennial celebrations. The home was dedicated by LDS Church president Spencer W. Kimball and was broadcast by satellite, as part of the church's semi-annual church general conference, to many LDS stake centers around the world. The Whitmer log home continues to be operated as a religious historical site by the LDS Church.

The Christ Evangelical and Reformed Church and William Hoster House are listed on the National Register of Historic Places. The Rose Hill Mansion is a National Historic Landmark.

== Geography ==
According to the United States Census Bureau, the town has a total area of 66.5 square miles (172 km^{2}), of which 55.2 square miles (143 km^{2}) is land and 11.3 square miles (29 km^{2}) (17.00%) is water.

The west town line is Seneca Lake, and the east town line is Cayuga Lake. The north town line is partly marked by the Seneca River, which is part of the Cayuga-Seneca Canal, linked to the Erie Canal system.

New York state routes 89, 96, 96A and 414 are all north-south highways passing through the town. New York State Route 336 is a short east-west highway between McDougall and Fayette.

== Demographics ==
Historical population
Census	Pop.	Note	%±
1820	2,869		—
1830	3,216		12.1%
1840	3,731		16.0%
1850	3,786		1.5%
1860	3,742		−1.2%
1870	3,364		−10.1%
1880	3,316		−1.4%
1890	2,912		−12.2%
1900	2,711		−6.9%
1910	2,593		−4.4%
1920	2,215		−14.6%
1930	2,396		8.2%
1940	2,383		−0.5%
1950	2,557		7.3%
1960	2,825		10.5%
1970	2,997		6.1%
1980	3,561		18.8%
1990	3,636		2.1%
2000	3,643		0.2%
2010	3,929		7.9%
2020	3,617		−7.9%
2021 (est.)	3,602		−0.4%
U.S. Decennial Census

As of the census of 2010, there were 3,929 people, 1,535 households, and 1,114 families residing in the town. The population density was 71.2 inhabitants per square mile (27.5/km^{2}). The racial makeup of the town was 97.7% White, 0.6% Black or African American, 0.1% Native American, 0.4% Asian, 0.0% Pacific Islander, 0.4% from other races, and 0.8% from two or more races. Hispanic or Latino of any race were 1.6% of the population.

There were 1,535 households, out of which 27.0% had children under the age of 18 living with them, 59.8% were married couples living together, 9.1% had a female householder with no husband present, and 27.4% were non-families. 21.2% of all households were made up of individuals, and 10.1% had someone living alone who was 65 years of age or older. The average household size was 2.54 and the average family size was 2.96.

In the town, the population was spread out, with 25.6% under the age of 20, 5.3% from 20 to 24, 20.5% from 25 to 44, 31.5% from 45 to 64, and 17.1% who were 65 years of age or older. The median age was 43.8 years. For every 100 females, there were 97.2 males. For every 100 females age 18 and over, there were 97.6 males.

The median income for a household in the town was $69,545, and the median income for a family was $75,441. Males had a median income of $47,659 versus $34,450 for females. The per capita income for the town was $29,075. About 4.5% of families and 6.3% of the population were below the poverty line, including 5.0% of those under age 18 and 3.7% of those age 65 or over.

=== Housing ===
There were 1,884 housing units at an average density of 34.1 per square mile (13.2/km^{2}). 18.5% of housing units were vacant.

There were 1,535 occupied housing units in the town. 1,301 were owner-occupied units (84.8%), while 234 were renter-occupied (15.2%). The homeowner vacancy rate was 1.3% of total units. The rental unit vacancy rate was 6.0%.

NOTE: It is common for resort communities to have higher than normal vacant house counts. Many are vacation homes which are seasonal and not regularly occupied.

== Communities and locations in the Town of Fayette ==
- Canoga – A hamlet near Cayuga Lake by NY-89.
- Canoga Marsh – a freshwater marsh on the shore of Cayuga Lake
- Canoga Springs – A hamlet in the east part of the town on County Road 121.
- Fayette – The hamlet of Fayette on NY-414 at the south town line.
- Kuneytown – A hamlet south of Canoga Springs, located on County Road 154.
- Pastime Park – A lakeside hamlet on Seneca Lake.
- Rose Hill – A hamlet on NY-96A in the western part of Fayette.
- MacDougall – A hamlet on the south town line on NY-336.
- Seneca Lake State Park – A state park near the northwest part of Fayette at the Seneca River in the Town of Waterloo.
- Teall Beach – A lakeside hamlet on Seneca Lake.
- Waterloo – The south part of the Village of Waterloo is on NY-96 at the north town line.
- Yale – A hamlet on the south town line on County Road 126.
- Yost Corners – A location near the town center.

== Notable people ==
- Robert Seldon Duncanson, Hudson River School artist
- Red Jacket, "Saguwatha" ("the keeper awake"), the Seneca chief was born here.
- Robert S. Rose, former US Congressman
- Peter Whitmer Sr., a prominent early Latter Day Saint, one of the first six members and host of the organizational meeting of the Church of Christ founded by Joseph Smith in 1830.

== See also ==
- Border City Fire Department
