= Mack Creek =

Location
- Country: United States
- State: New York

Physical characteristics
- Mouth: Cayuga Lake
  - location: Elm Beach, New York, United States
  - coordinates: 42°42′02″N 76°44′36″W
- Basin size: 5.50 mi^{2} (14.2 km^{2})

Mack Creek is a river located in Seneca County, New York. It flows into Cayuga Lake by Elm Beach, New York.
