= Glen Creek =

Location
- Country: United States
- State: New York

Physical characteristics
- Source
  - coordinates: 42°45′50.00″N 76°38′23.00″W
- Mouth: Cayuga Lake
  - location: Aurora, Cayuga County, New York, United States
  - coordinates: 42°46′18.25″N 76°42′37.82″W
  - elevation: 381.9 ft (116.4 m)
- GNIS Feature ID 951176

Glen Creek is a river located in Cayuga County, New York. It flows into Cayuga Lake north of Aurora, New York.
