= Glenwood Creek =

Location
- Country: United States
- State: New York

Physical characteristics
- Mouth: Cayuga Lake
  - location: Duboise Corner, New York, United States
  - coordinates: 42°29′41″N 76°32′18″W
- Basin size: 1.72 mi^{2} (4.5 km^{2})

Glenwood Creek is a river located in Tompkins County, New York. It flows into Cayuga Lake east of Duboise Corner, New York.
