= Great Gully Brook =

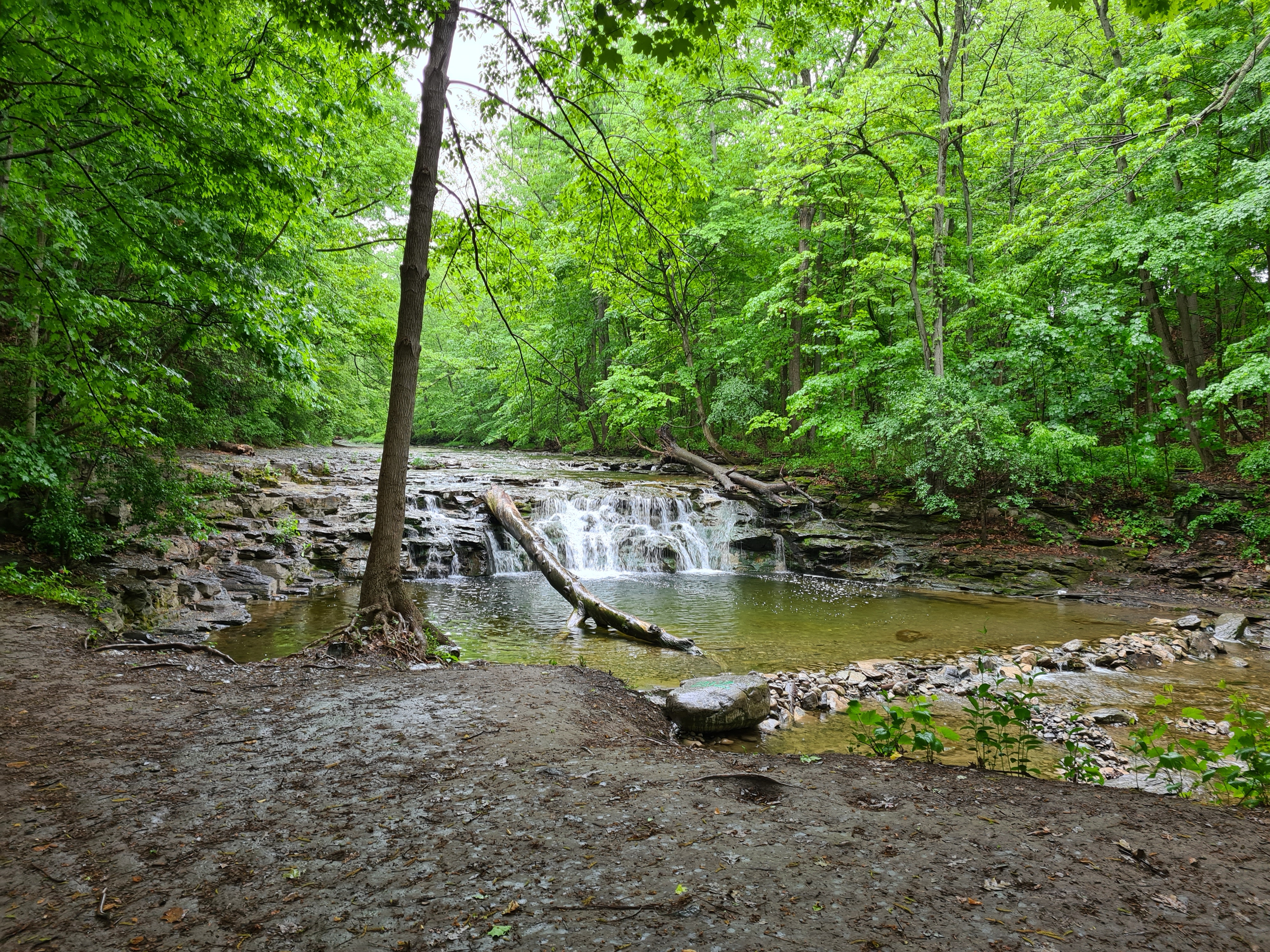
- Waterfall on Great Gully Brook

Location
- Country: United States
- State: New York

Physical characteristics
- Mouth: Cayuga Lake
  - location: Farleys, New York, United States
  - coordinates: 42°48′34″N 76°42′50″W
- Basin size: 15 mi^{2} (39 km^{2})

Great Gully Brook is a river located in Cayuga County, New York. It flows into Cayuga Lake by Farleys, New York.
