= Minnegar Brook =

Location
- Country: United States
- State: New York

Physical characteristics
- Mouth: Cayuga Lake
  - location: Myers, New York, United States
  - coordinates: 42°32′04″N 76°32′09″W
- Basin size: 1.21 mi^{2} (3.1 km^{2})

Minnegar Brook is a river located in Tompkins County, New York. It flows into Cayuga Lake by Myers, New York.
