= Big Hollow Creek =

Location
- Country: United States
- State: New York

Physical characteristics
- Mouth: Cayuga Lake
  - location: Poplar Beach, New York, United States
  - coordinates: 42°43′57″N 76°45′57″W
- Basin size: 2.29 mi^{2} (5.9 km^{2})

Big Hollow Creek is a river located in Seneca County, New York. It flows into Cayuga Lake by Poplar Beach, New York.
