= Bergen Creek =

Location
- Country: United States
- State: New York

Physical characteristics
- Mouth: Cayuga Lake
  - location: Bergen Beach, New York, United States
  - coordinates: 42°36′52″N 76°40′55″W
- Basin size: 1.42 mi^{2} (3.7 km^{2})

Bergen Creek is a river located in Seneca County, New York. It flows into Cayuga Lake by Bergen Beach, New York.
