= Frontenac Island =

Island in Cayuga County, New York, United States

Coordinates: 42°50′36″N 76°42′26″W

Frontenac Island is a small limestone base island in Cayuga Lake in central New York, known for a significant Late Archaic archaeological site dating to approximately 2000 BC. The site has yielded artifacts associated with both the Lamoka and Brewerton traditions, and is considered important evidence of overlap and interaction between regional cultural groups in upstate New York.

== Geography ==
Frontenac Island is one of only two islands in the Finger Lakes. It is located on towards the northeast end of Cayuga Lake, near Union Springs.

== Archeological work ==
Archaeological investigations have identified a mixture of projectile points and other stone tools characteristic of both traditions. Because Lamoka sites are most common in the southern Finger Lakes and Brewerton sites in central and northern New York, the location of Frontenac Island places it within a geographic transition zone between these regions. The site has therefore been interpreted as representing a composite or “Frontenac” phase, in which elements of both traditions appear together.

Frontenac Island is one of the clearest examples in New York archaeology of Late Archaic cultural interaction, and has been used to support interpretations of contact between groups occupying different ecological and geographic zones during this period.

The site is the earliest known example in the state of larger, collie sized canine domestication.

== Modern history ==
In 1856, Union Springs assumed ownership of the island. In the early 20th century, Frontenac Island was a popular site for picnicking, which sparked a movement in 1915 to preserve the island as a park.
