= Canoga Marsh =

Marsh in New York, United States

Coordinates: 42°51′58″N 76°44′25″W

Canoga Marsh is a freshwater marsh on the shore of Cayuga Lake, in Seneca County, New York, United States. 104 acres (42 ha) of the land are managed by the New York State Department of Environmental Conservation as a Wildlife Management Area. The marsh is formed where Canoga Creek enters the lake.

== History ==
=== Canoga Island ===
The marshland formed by Canoga Creek surrounds a narrow strip of land, informally referred to as "Canoga Island", on three sides, separating it from the mainland. By the 1960s, a number of houses had been built on "Canoga Island", which was only accessible by foot over a boardwalk. Around this time, a dispute emerged over land ownership. The Hibiscus Harbor Corporation, which had owned the surrounding land since 1960 or 1961, maintained that "Canoga Island" was not in reality an island because Cayuga Lake only surrounded one side of the island, and the marsh the other three. Therefore, the company argued, it should be considered as part of their plot, which they hoped to develop into a marina.

Residents of the island held that they had been living on the island for decades, establishing their rights of ownership to the land. New York State argued that if the land was indeed an island, ownership would fall to the state. In 1977, the New York Court of Appeals ruled that the land was a peninsula rather than an island, granting ownership to Hibiscus Harbor (shortly transferred to a realty company). Homeowners continued to dispute this decision.

=== Preservation ===
In the 1990s, the Department of Environmental Conservation (DEC) sued 20 homeowners near the marsh, after they illegally filled in the wetland as part of a road building project.

According to a report in The Ithaca Journal from 2000, the DEC had sought to acquire the marsh for preservation as early as the 1960s. In 2000, 104 acres (42 ha) of marshland, including 1,300 feet (400 m) of Cayuga Lake shoreline were donated to New York State. The state has since operated the land as a Wildlife Management Area.
