= William Hoster House =

Historic house in New York, United States

- U.S. National Register of Historic Places
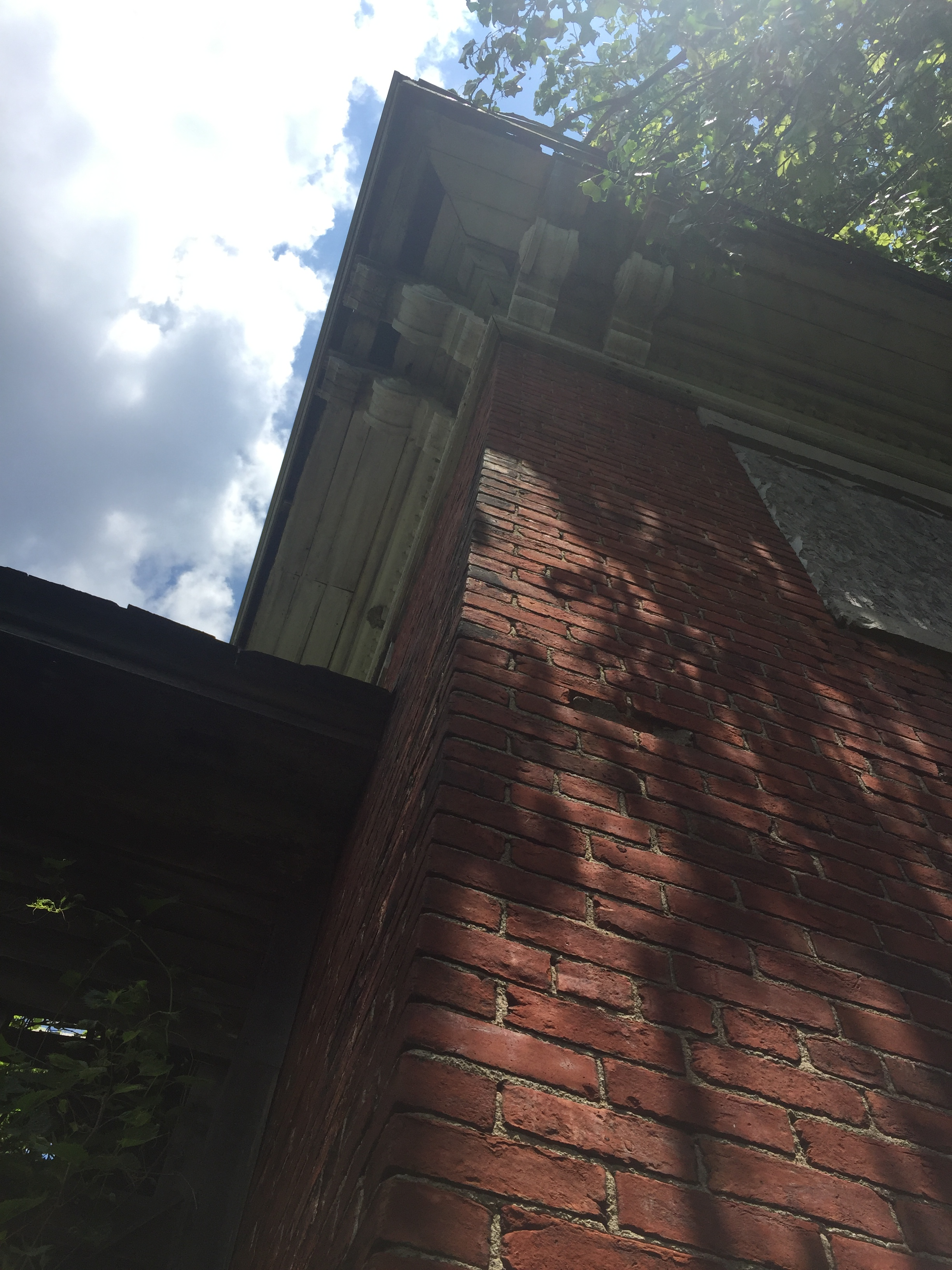
- House in 2021

- Location within New York Location within the United States
- Location: 3832 NY 414, Fayette, New York
- Coordinates: 42.83890°N 76.80874°W
- Area: 135 acres (0.55 km^{2})
- Built: c.1830
- Architectural style: Federal, Italianate
- NRHP reference No.: 02001662
- Added to NRHP: December 31, 2002

William Hoster House is a historic home located at Fayette in Seneca County, New York. It is a four bay wide, two story, brick dwelling built about 1830 in the Federal style and later modified in the 1850s-1860s in the Italianate style. The hipped roof on the main block is topped by a distinctive octagonal cupola. Also on the property is a small, gable roofed corn crib.

It was listed on the National Register of Historic Places in 2002.

When listed in 2002, the house stood clear on a hill, presumably quite visible from NY-414, which is only about 500 feet (150 m) away.

In 2021, the house was completely hidden from the road by trees and vines.
