= Williams Brook =

Location
- Country: United States
- State: New York

Physical characteristics
- Mouth: Cayuga Lake
  - location: Ithaca, New York, United States
  - coordinates: 42°27′30″N 76°31′13″W
- Basin size: 1.29 sq mi (3.3 km^{2})

Williams Brook is a river located in Tompkins County, New York. It flows into Cayuga Lake by Ithaca, New York.
