= Red Creek (New York) =

Location
- Country: United States
- State: New York

Physical characteristics
- Mouth: Cayuga Lake
  - location: Kings Corners, New York, United States
  - coordinates: 42°47′30″N 76°45′57″W
- Basin size: 5.72 mi^{2} (14.8 km^{2})

Red Creek is a river located in Seneca County, New York. It flows into Cayuga Lake by Kings Corners, New York.
