= Paines Creek (New York) =

Location
- Country: United States
- State: New York

Physical characteristics
- Mouth: Cayuga Lake
  - location: Aurora, New York, United States
  - coordinates: 42°44′15″N 76°42′11″W
- Basin size: 15.4 mi^{2} (40 km^{2})

Paines Creek is a river located in Cayuga County, New York. It flows into Cayuga Lake by Aurora, New York.
