= Sheldrake Creek =

Location
- Country: United States
- State: New York

Physical characteristics
- Mouth: Cayuga Lake
  - location: Sheldrake, New York, United States
  - coordinates: 42°39′53″N 76°42′01″W
- Basin size: 8.40 mi^{2} (21.8 km^{2})

Sheldrake Creek is a river located in Seneca County, New York. It flows into Cayuga Lake by Sheldrake, New York.
