= Bolton Point (water system) =

Coordinates: 42.4988°N 76.5118°W

The Southern Cayuga Lake Intermunicipal Water Commission, commonly known as the Bolton Point Water System or just Bolton Point, is a public water system serving the suburbs and surroundings of Ithaca, New York.

The system draws water from Cayuga Lake, and serves the Village of Lansing, the Village of Cayuga Heights, the Town of Ithaca (including Ithaca College), the Town of Lansing, and parts of the Town of Dryden. It is one of three water systems in the Ithaca area, the others being run by the City of Ithaca and Cornell University.

The system was created after a drought in the mid-1960s prompted local officials to seek alternatives to the existing, creek-supplied water systems in the area. It opened in 1976.
