= Salmon Creek (Cayuga Lake) =

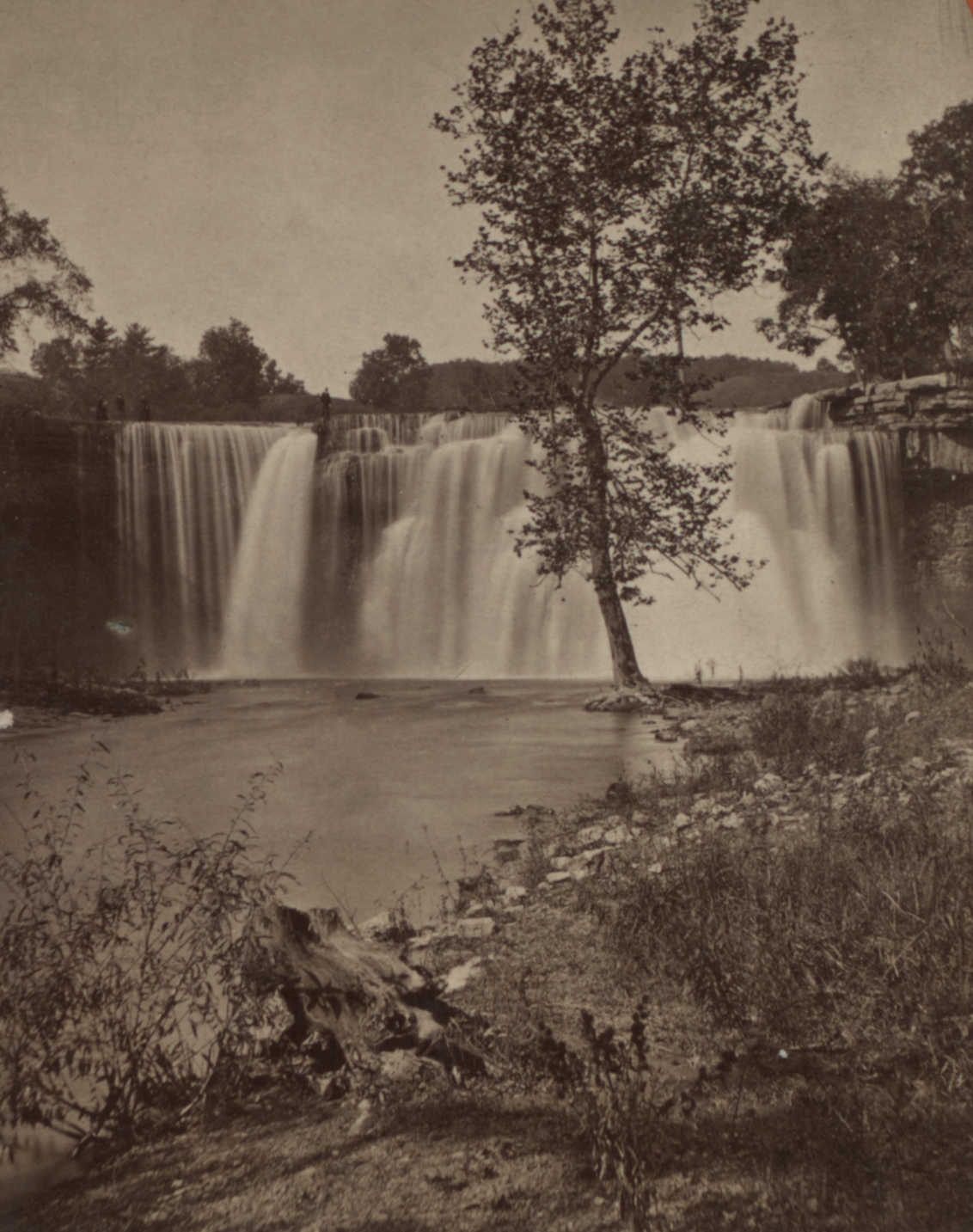
- Ludlowville Falls on Salmon Creek

Location
- Country: United States
- State: New York
- County: Tompkins County, New York

Physical characteristics
- Mouth: Cayuga Lake
  - location: Myers, New York, United States
  - coordinates: 42°32′18″N 76°33′00″W
- Length: 1.3 Miles
- Basin size: 89.2 mi^{2} (231 km^{2})

Salmon Creek is a river located in Tompkins County, New York. It flows into Cayuga Lake by Myers, New York.
