= Shelldrake River =

- Location within the state of Michigan

Physical characteristics
- Source: Sheephead Lake
  - location: Whitefish Township, Michigan
  - coordinates: 46°38′26″N 85°13′43″W
  - elevation: 715 feet (218 m)
- Mouth: Whitefish Bay
  - location: Shelldrake, Michigan
  - coordinates: 46°40′32.3″N 85°01′40.4″W
  - elevation: 602 feet (183 m)
- Length: 32 miles (51.5 km)

Basin features
- Tributaries
  - right: S. Branch Shelldrake River
- Waterbodies: Shelldrake Lake

The Shelldrake River is a 32-mile-long (51 km) river in Chippewa County on the Upper Peninsula of Michigan in the United States. It flows through Tahquamenon Falls State Park and the Lake Superior State Forest into Lake Superior.

The Shelldrake River's headwaters are an undefined area in the Betsy Lake Wetland, an Eastern Hemlock and tamarack forest in the roadless area of northern Tahquamenon Falls State Park. This wetland, in Chippewa County and adjacent Luce County, is dominated by Lake Superior-fed rain and snow. For mapping purposes, the Shelldrake River is depicted as flowing out of Sheephead Lake, a little-visited lake in the Betsy Lake Wetland area.

Much of the Shelldrake River's course passes through the Betsy Lake Wetland, and an alternate name for the river is the "Betsy River".

The Shelldrake River flows generally west-to-east towards its mouth in Shelldrake, Michigan on Whitefish Bay of Lake Superior. A dam impounds the river 8 miles (13 km) northwest of Shelldrake; a state-run rustic campground at the dam pond offers 17 spaces, mostly for fishermen seeking northern pike.

Local large mammals include moose and black bear. There is a noted sandhill crane nesting ground near the mouth of the river.

Henry Rowe Schoolcraft camped at the mouth of the Shelldrake on June 18–19, 1820, finding a small village of Ojibwa who fished for whitefish in the lake.

The Shelldrake River should not be confused with the Sheldrake River in Westchester County, New York.
