= Taughannock Creek =

River in the U.S. state of New York

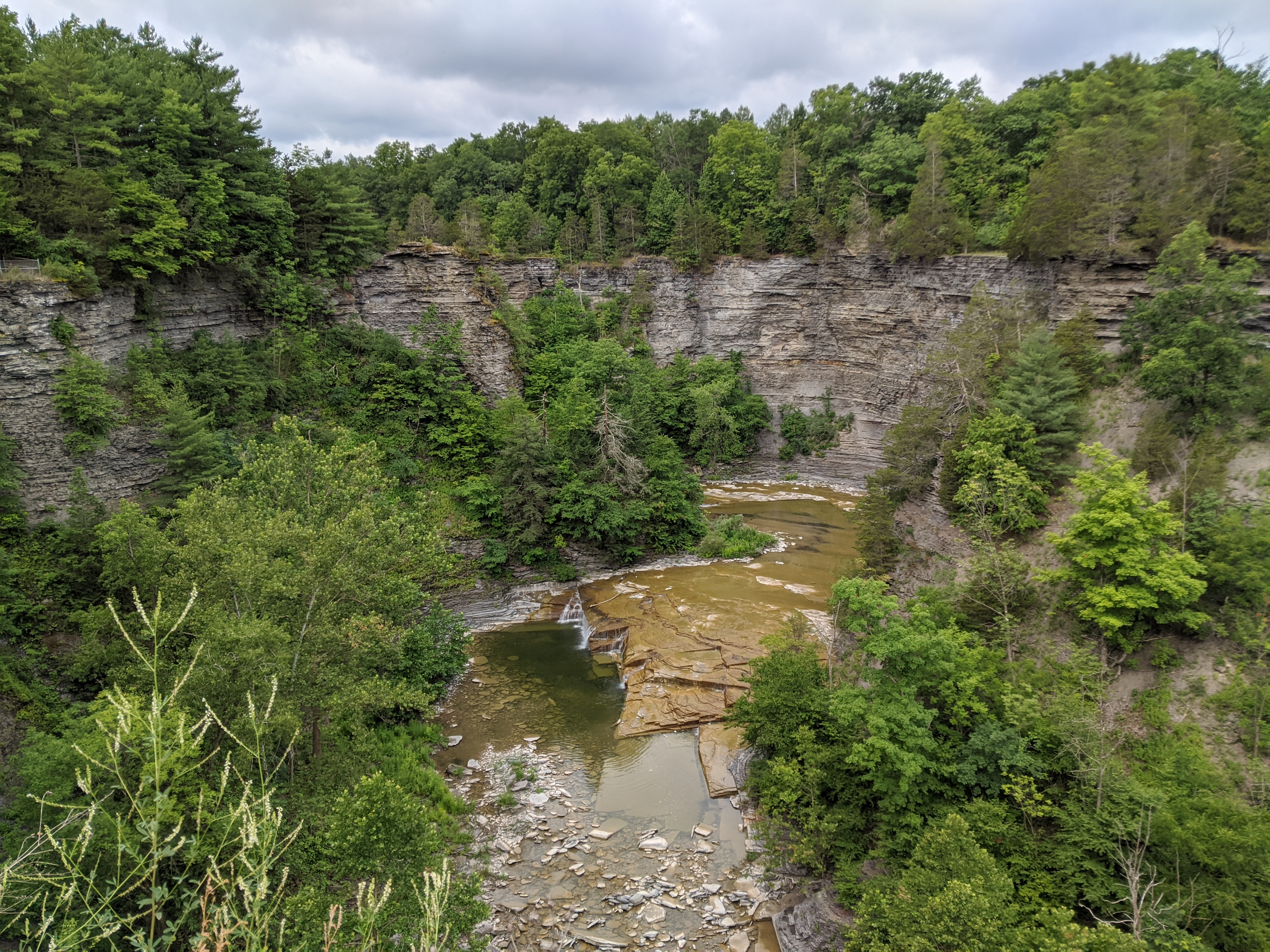
- Taughannock Creek upstream of Taughannock Falls

Location
- Country: United States
- State: New York
- Region: Finger Lakes
- Counties: Tompkins, Schuyler

Physical characteristics
- Mouth: Cayuga Lake
  - location: Trumansburg
  - coordinates: 42°32′57″N 76°35′57″W
- Basin size: 67 mi^{2} (170 km^{2})

Basin features
- Waterfalls: Taughannock Falls

Taughannock Creek is a river located in Tompkins and Schuyler counties in New York. It flows into Cayuga Lake east of Trumansburg. Taughannock Falls is located on the creek.

== Course ==
Taughannock Falls' main cataract is a 215-foot drop (66 m), making it 33 feet (10 m) taller than Niagara Falls. It is the tallest single-drop waterfall east of the Rocky Mountains. The waterfall is located along the creek, which flows through a long gorge with cliffs up to 400 feet (120 m) high.

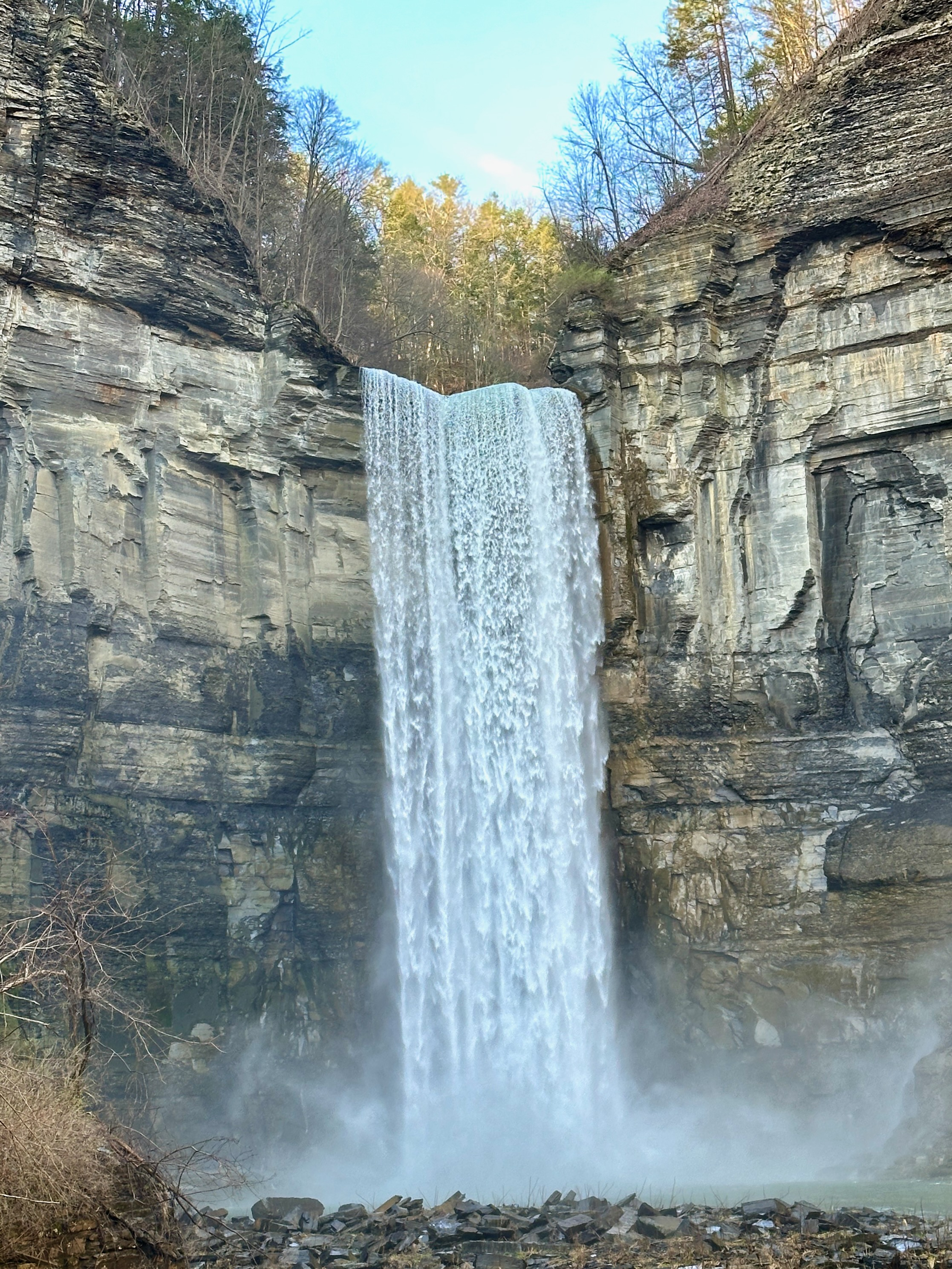
Taughannock Falls
