= Brewerton phase =

Prehistoric culture in New York, United States

The Brewerton phase is a Late Archaic prehistoric culture in central and northern New York, generally dated to around 2500–2000 BC, though some sources give a broader date range of 2,900-1800 BC. It is best known from sites near the outlet of Oneida Lake and along the Seneca River, where repeated occupations suggest the use of major waterways as focal points for settlement and movement. Brewerton sites are commonly identified by broad, side-notched projectile points and other stone tools associated with hunting and general resource use. Compared with other groups in the southern Finger Lakes region around the same time, Brewerton populations appear to have placed relatively greater emphasis on hunting, while still making use of riverine and lake environments.

The Brewerton phase is often discussed alongside the Lamoka culture to the south, and evidence from central New York suggests that these groups may have overlapped and interacted in some areas such as Frontenac Island during the Late Archaic period.

The O’Neil site, located along the Seneca River near the outlet of Oneida Lake, is one of the key archaeological sites used to define the Brewerton phase. Excavations in central New York have shown that sites in this river–lake corridor were repeatedly occupied, reflecting the importance of the area as a major travel and resource zone. Radiocarbon dates three projectile points found at the O’Neil site to approximately 1250 BC, helping to anchor the later chronology of Late Archaic and Transitional occupations in the region.
