= Cayuga Lake =

Lake in Central New York, United States

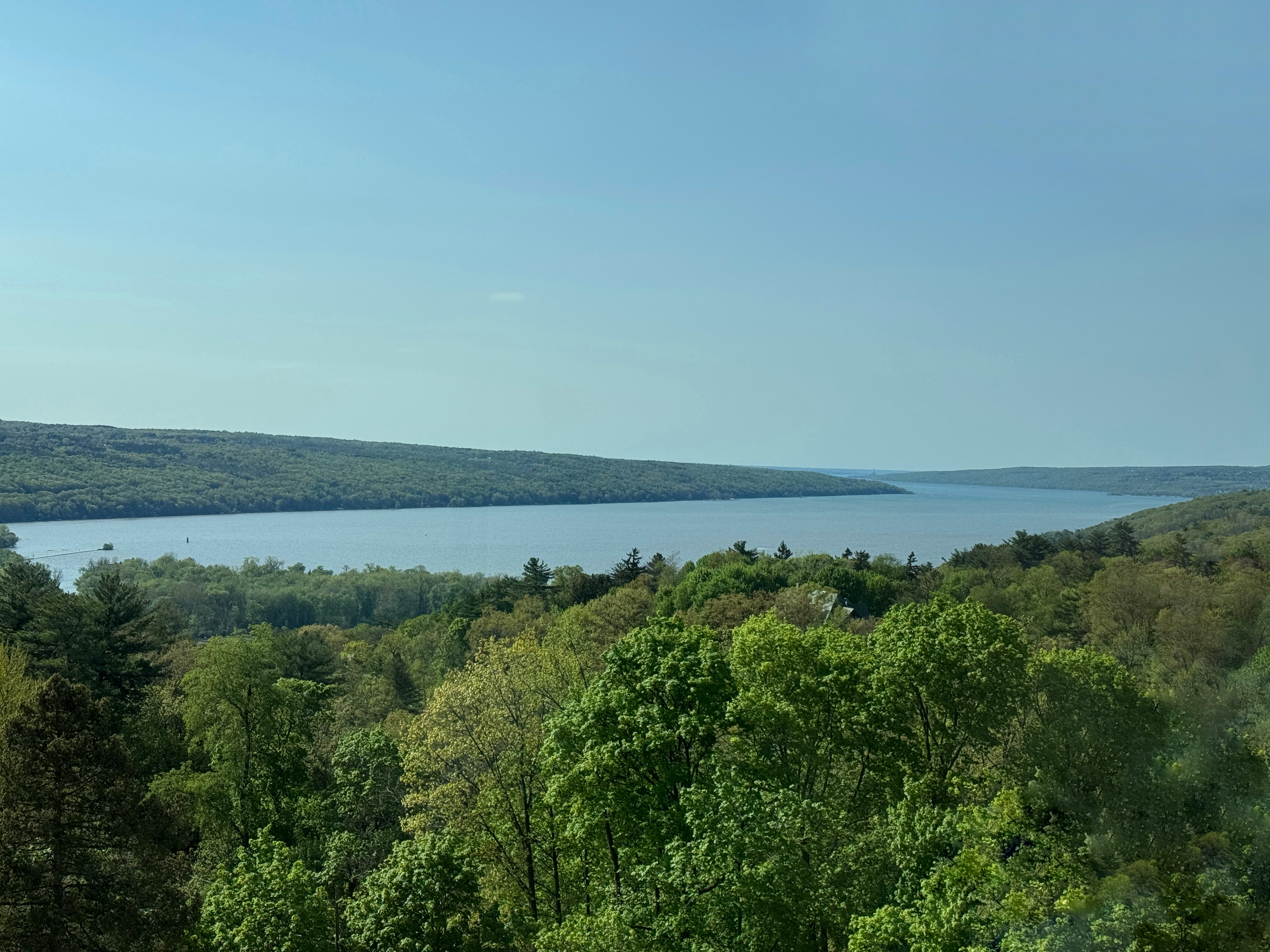
- Cayuga Lake as viewed from the Johnson Museum at Cornell University

- Location of Cayuga Lake in New York state Cayuga Lake (the United States)
- Location: Cayuga / Seneca / Tompkins counties, New York, U.S.
- Group: Finger Lakes
- Coordinates: 42°41′17″N 76°42′8″W
- Lake type: Ground moraine
- Primary inflows: Fall Creek, Cayuga Inlet, Salmon Creek, Taughannock Creek, Six Mile Creek
- Primary outflows: Seneca River
- Catchment area: 2,033 km^{2} (785 sq mi)
- Basin countries: United States
- Max. length: 61.4 km (38.2 mi)
- Max. width: 3.5 mi (5.6 km)
- Surface area: 172 km^{2} (66 sq mi)
- Average depth: 54.5 m (179 ft)
- Max. depth: 133 m (436 ft)
- Water volume: 9.4 km^{3} (2.3 cu mi)
- Residence time: 18.2 years
- Shore length^{1}: 153.4 km (95.3 mi)
- Surface elevation: 381.9 ft (116.4 m)
- Islands: 1 (Frontenac Island)
- Settlements: see article
- ^{1} Shore length is not a well-defined measure.

The eleven Finger Lakes of New York State.

Cayuga Lake (/kəˈjuːɡə/ kə-YOO-ghə, /keɪˈjuːɡə/ kay-YOO-ghə, or /kaɪˈjuːɡə/ kye-YOO-ghə) is a Finger Lake in central New York state. Spanning three counties - Cayuga, Seneca, and Tompkins - it is the longest, second largest (in surface area, marginally smaller than Seneca), and second largest in volume. It is just under 39 miles (63 km) long, with an average width of 1.7 miles (2.8 km), and is 3.5 mi wide (5.6 km) at its widest point, near Aurora. It is approximately 435 ft deep (133 m) at its deepest point, and has over 95 miles (153 km) of shoreline.

== Etymology ==
The lake is named after the indigenous Cayuga people.

The Cayuga, whose name translates to "People of the Great Swamp," are one of the founding members of the Haudenosaunee Confederacy, also known as the Iroquois League. This alliance of Indigenous nations originally formed in what is now New York State. The Cayuga traditionally lived in the Finger Lakes region, specifically around Cayuga Lake. Their territory was situated between the lands of the Onondaga to the east and the Seneca to the west—two other nations within the Haudenosaunee alliance. Today, Cayuga descendants are part of several recognized communities.

== Location ==
The city of Ithaca, home to Ithaca College and Cornell University, is located at the southern end of Cayuga Lake.

On its northern tip lies the town of Seneca Falls, which was the site of the Seneca Falls Convention on women's rights, as well as the model for the town of Bedford Falls in which Frank Capra's It's A Wonderful Life was set. The Town of Seneca Falls comprises 25.3 square miles and is one of ten townships in Seneca County; it is also the county's largest community with approximately 8,650 residents.

Villages and settlements along the east shore of Cayuga Lake include Myers, King Ferry, Aurora, Levanna, Union Springs, and Cayuga. Settlements along the west shore of the lake include Sheldrake, Romulus, and Canoga.

The lake has one small island, uninhabited Frontenac in the northeast near Union Springs. This island has several camps and is inhabited during the summer months. The only other island in any of the Finger Lakes is Skenoh Island in Canandaigua Lake.

== Geography ==
The lake has the steep east and west sides and shallow north and south ends typical of the glacially carved Finger Lakes, which date to the last Ice Age.

The water level is regulated by the Mud Lock at the north end of the lake. It is connected to Lake Ontario by the Erie Canal, and Seneca Lake by the Seneca River. The lake is drawn down as winter approaches, to minimize ice damage and to maximize its capacity to store heavy spring runoff.

The north end is dominated by shallow mudflats and marsh, which provide an important stopover for migratory birds and are part of the Montezuma National Wildlife Refuge. The southern end is also shallow and often freezes during the winter.

== Human impact ==
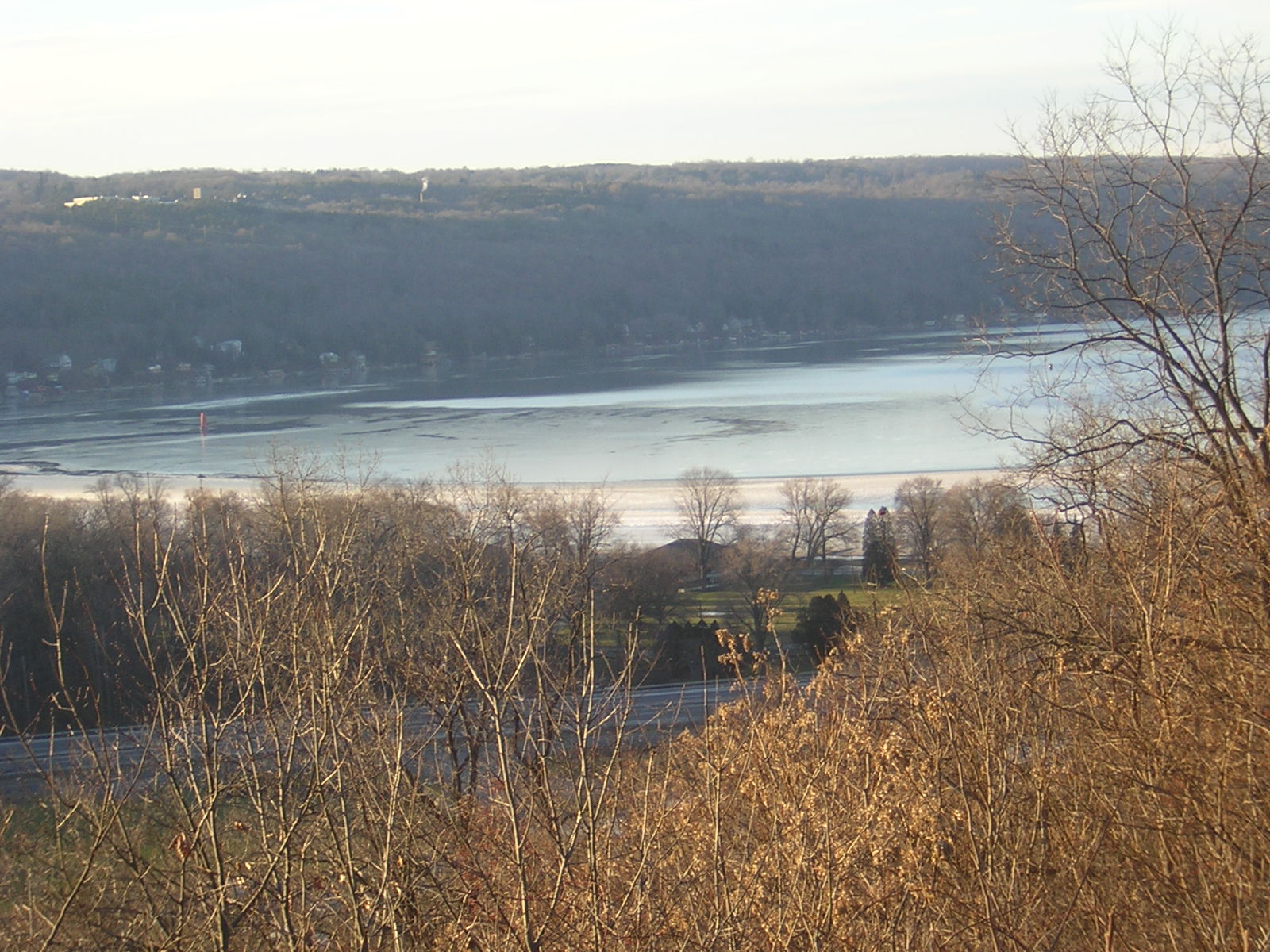
Winter view of the head of Cayuga Lake

Early human activity in the area includes Late Archaic occupations associated with the Lamoka tradition, as well as the Frontenac Island site, which reflects interaction between Lamoka and Brewerton groups.

Cayuga Lake is very popular among recreational boaters. The Allan H. Treman State Marine Park at the southern end of the lake in Ithaca offers a large state marina and boat launch. On the western shore are Ithaca Yacht Club, a few miles north of Ithaca, and Red Jacket Yacht Club, just south of Canoga. There are several other marinas and boat launches scattered along the lake shore.

Cayuga Lake is the source of drinking water for several communities, including Lansing, near the southern end of the lake along the east side, which draws water through the Bolton Point Water System. Several lake source cooling systems operate on the lake, whereby cooler water is pumped from the depths of the lake and used to cool warm water from buildings, which is returned to them cooled (in a form of heat pump transfer). One of these systems, which is operated by Cornell University and began operation in 2000, was controversial during the planning and building stages, due to its potential for having a negative environmental impact. However, all of the environmental impact reports and scientific studies have shown that the Cornell lake source cooling system has not yet had, and will not likely have, any measurably significant environmental impact. Furthermore, Cornell's system pumps significantly less warm water back into the lake than others further north, which have been operating for decades, including the coal-fired power plant on the eastern shore.

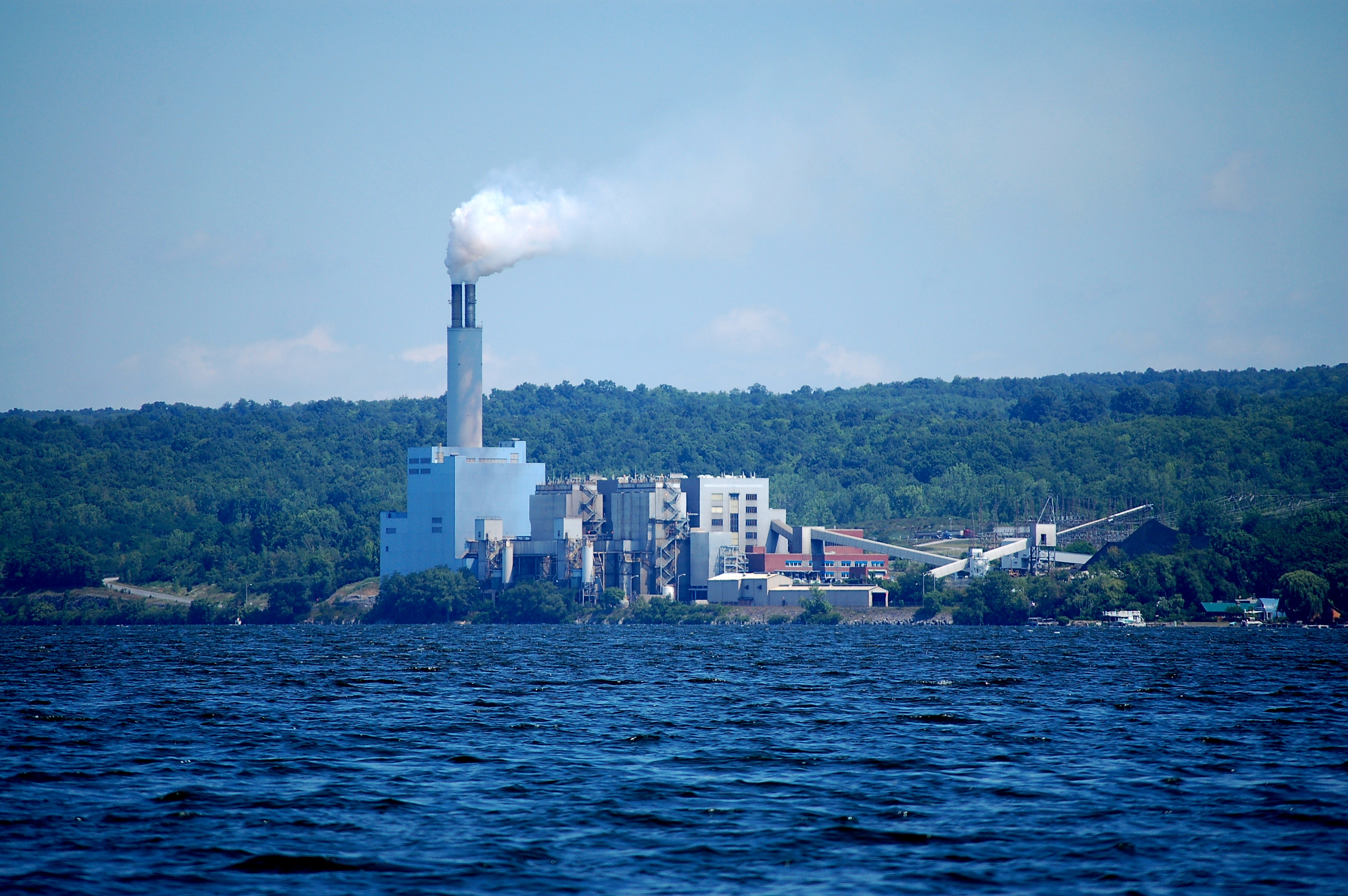
AES Cayuga, on the eastern shore of the lake

The AES Coal Power plant was shut down in August 2019, and there are plans to convert it into a data center in the near future. The plant used to use Cayuga Lake as a cooling source. In the late 1960s, citizens successfully opposed the construction of an 830-MW nuclear power plant on the shore of Cayuga Lake.

Rod Serling named his production company Cayuga Productions, during the years of his TV series, The Twilight Zone. Serling and his family had a summer home at Cayuga Lake.

== Fishing ==
The fish population is managed, and substantial sport fishing is practiced, with anglers targeting smelt, lake trout and smallmouth bass. Fish species present in the lake include lake trout, landlocked salmon, brown trout, rainbow trout, smallmouth bass, smelt, alewife, atlantic salmon, black crappie, bluegill, pickerel, largemouth bass, northern pike, pumpkinseed sunfish, rock bass, and yellow perch. The round goby has been an invasive species in the lake since the 1990s. There are state-owned hard surface ramps in Cayuga–Seneca Canal, Lock #1 (Mud Lock), Long Point State Park, Cayuga Lake State Park, Deans Cove Boat Launch, Taughannock Falls State Park, and Allan H. Treman State Marine Park.

== Tributaries ==
The major inflows to the lake are: Fall Creek, Cayuga Inlet, Salmon Creek, Taughannock Creek, and Six Mile Creek; while the lake outflows into the Seneca River and other tributaries. Ungaged tributaries that flow to the lake include:

- Barnum Creek
- Bergen Creek
- Big Hollow Creek
- Bloomer Creek
- Canoga Creek
- Dean Creek
- Demont Creek
- Glen Creek
- Glenwood Creek
- Great Gully Brook
- Groves Creek
- Gulf Creek
- Indian Creek
- Little Creek
- Lively Run
- Mack Creek
- Minnegar Brook
- Morrow Creek
- Paines Creek
- Red Creek
- Schuyler Creek
- Sheldrake Creek
- Trumansburg Creek
- Williams Brook
- Willow Creek
- Yawger Creek

== Folklore ==
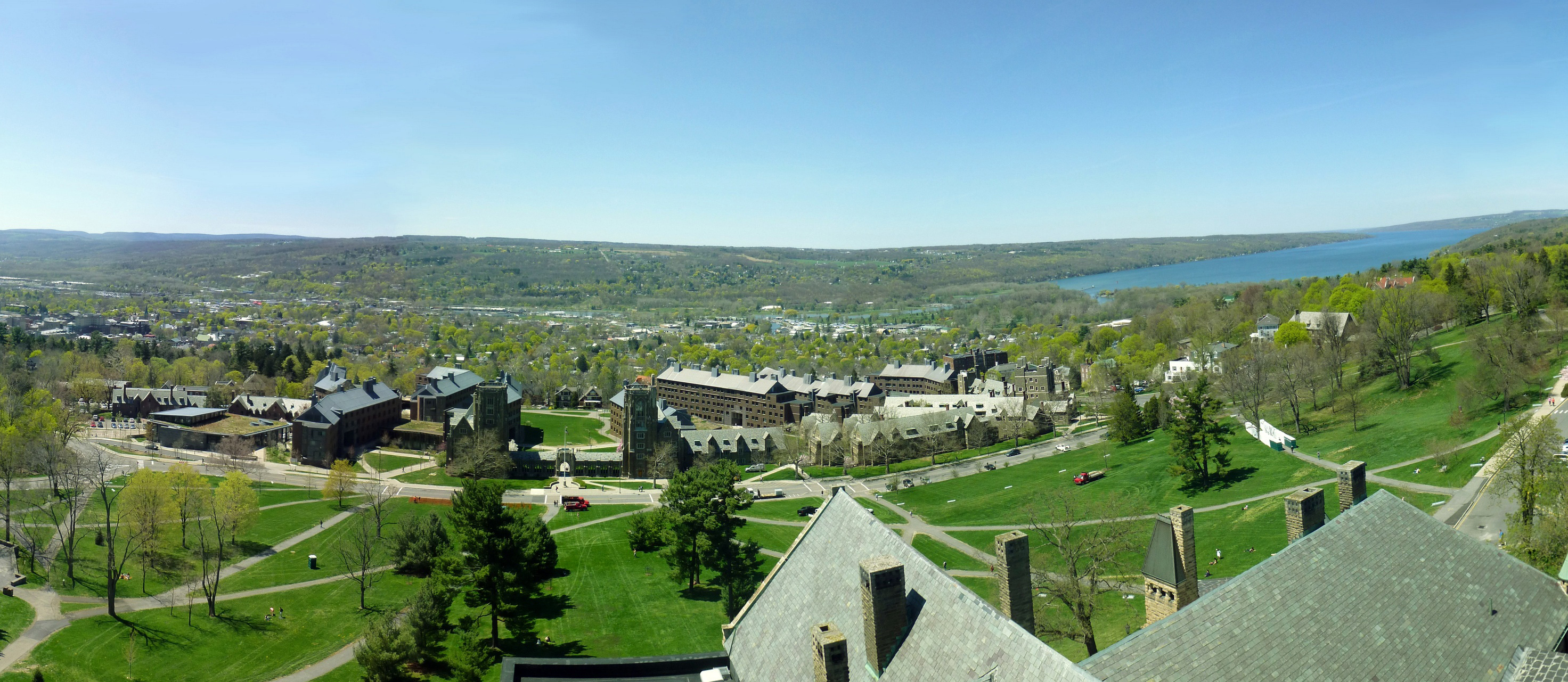
Cornell West Campus and Cayuga Lake, as seen from McGraw Tower

The lake is the subject of local folklore.

An Ithaca Journal article of 5 January 1897, reported that a sea serpent, nicknamed "Old Greeny," had been sighted in Cayuga Lake annually for 69 years. A sighting in that month described the animal, 200 feet (61 m) from shore, as "large and its body long", although a "tramp" suggested it was a muskrat. In 1929, two creatures, about 12 to 15 feet (3.7 to 4.6 m) in length, were reportedly spotted along the eastern shore of the lake. Further sightings were reported in 1974 and 1979.

Cornell's alma mater makes reference to its position "Far Above Cayuga's Waters", while that of Ithaca College references "Cayuga's shore".

A tradition at Wells College in Aurora, New York, held that if the lake completely freezes over, classes are canceled, though for only one day. According to Wells College records, this happened eight times, in "1875, 1912, 1918, 1934, 1948, 1962, 1979 and 2015."

Cayuga Lake, like nearby Seneca Lake, is also the site of a phenomenon known as the Guns of the Seneca, mysterious cannon-like booms heard in the surrounding area. Many of these booms may be attributable to bird-scarers, automated cannon-like devices used by farmers to scare birds away from the many vineyards, orchards and crops. There is, however, no proof of this.

== Wine ==
Cayuga Lake is included in the American Viticultural Area. Established in 1988, the AVA now boasts over a dozen wineries, four distilleries, a cidery, and a meadery.

== See also ==
- Montezuma National Wildlife Refuge
- Taughannock Falls
