= Rhoda Palmer =

American suffragist (1816–1919)

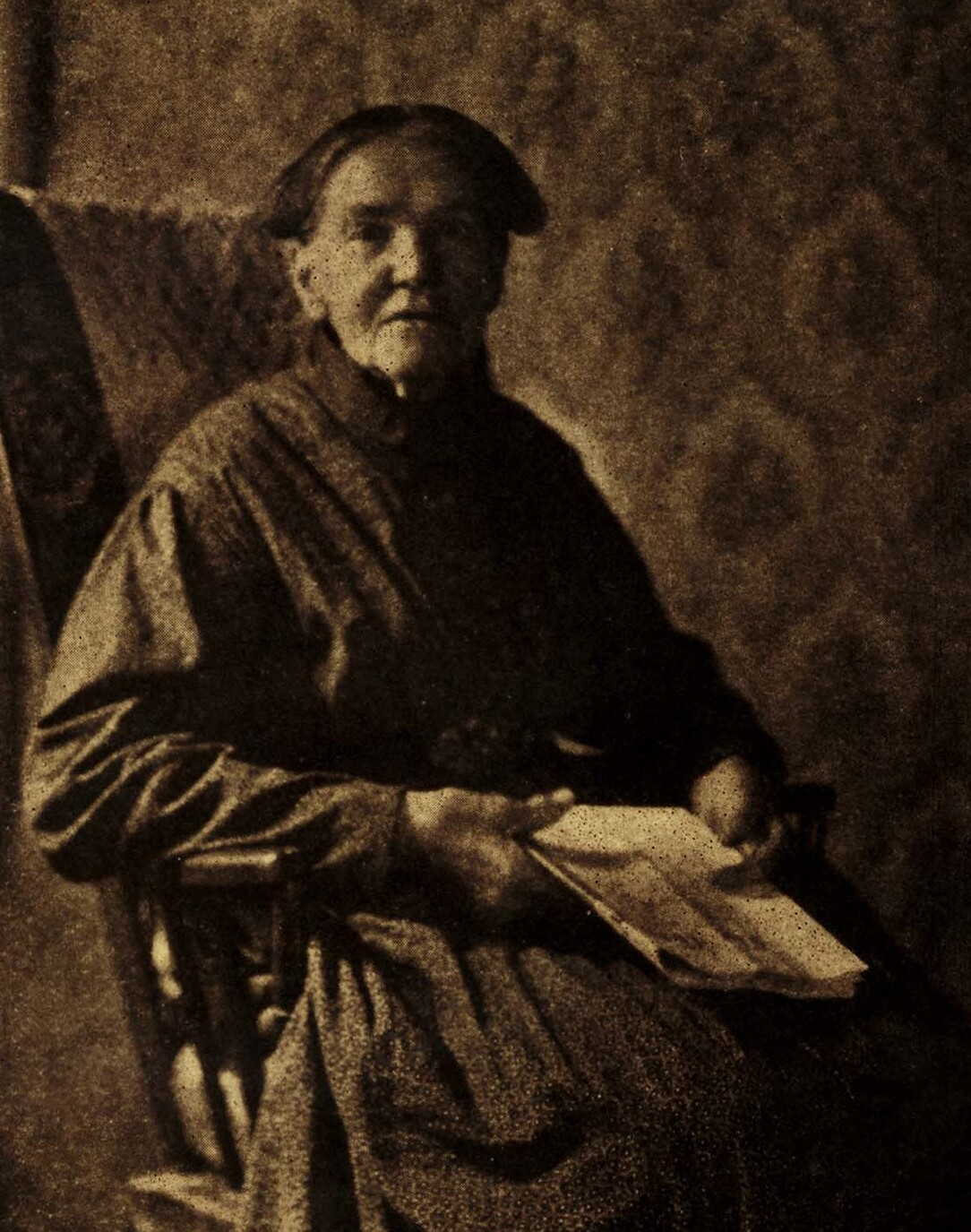
- Palmer c. 1908
- Born: June 25, 1816
- Died: August 9, 1919 (aged 103)
- Occupation: Activist
- Notable work: Last surviving delegate from Seneca Falls.

Rhoda Palmer (June 25, 1816 – August 9, 1919) was an American suffragist and abolitionist known for attending the Seneca Falls Convention and signing the pro–universal suffrage Declaration of Sentiments. She was the only signer of the Declaration known to have voted in an election, which she did in 1918, shortly before her death at 103 as the last surviving delegate at Seneca Falls.

== Early life and activism ==
Born on June 25, 1816, Palmer was the seventh of nine children born to Asa and Abigail Palmer, who farmed 2 miles (3 km) north of Geneva, New York. She attended a female seminary in Geneva. She was well-traveled for her time, visiting Chicago, Michigan, Philadelphia, New York City and New England in her 20s.

Her parents became Quakers when she was a child, and for the rest of her life she attended the Junius Monthly Meeting, although she did not officially join. Palmer and her family were influenced by Quakerism's anti-slavery and gender equality values; Asa Palmer was an abolitionist and the Palmer family hosted in their home escaped slaves fleeing to Canada. Through the Junius Monthly Meeting, Palmer met several other abolitionists and suffragists, including Mary Ann M'Clintock, and she heard lectures from Sojourner Truth, among others. She also attended the 1848 commencement ceremony of Geneva Medical College, where Palmer witnessed the graduation of the first woman medical school graduate (Elizabeth Blackwell) and one of the first Native American medical school graduates (Wa-o-wa-wa-na-onk).

== Seneca Falls Convention ==
It was through her network of Quakers and abolitionist activists that Palmer learned about the convention planned for Seneca Falls in 1848 that would focus on the "social, civil, and religious condition and rights of women". She attended with her father, joining a number of other Quakers from Waterloo, a village near Geneva. At the conclusion of the convention, she became one of the signers of the Declaration of Sentiments, a document that deliberately echoed the United States Declaration of Independence in its emphasis on the "self-evident" rights of women.

Palmer continued as a women's rights activist, attending an 1853 conference in New York City that convened suffrage advocates, abolitionists and temperance reformers.

== Later life and death ==
Palmer never married, she lived in the house of her birth until the age of 94, when she experienced an injury that caused her to move in with her nephew two doors away. She became a painter in later life and throughout her life was known for entertaining friends and advocating for women's rights.

Following a successful women's suffrage referendum in New York state in November 1917, Palmer registered to vote. She was driven to the polls in order to cast her first ballot in the November 1918 state election at 102. Palmer was the only signer of the Declaration of Sentiments who is known to have cast a vote during her lifetime. (Note: Seneca Falls Convention delegate Catharine Paine Blaine moved to Washington Territory and was registered to vote there during the short-lived period from 1883 to 1887 when women could vote there, although whether she actually voted in an election is unknown from surviving records.)

Palmer died on August 9, 1919, at 103, the last surviving participant in the Seneca Falls Convention. She was interred in the Quaker cemetery in Waterloo.
