= Marla Schweppe =

American digital artist and educator

- Schweppe
- Occupations: Digital artist, theatrical designer, and educator
- Employer: Rochester Institute of Technology

Marla Schweppe is an American digital artist, theatrical designer, and retired professor. At the Rochester Institute of Technology (RIT), she developed an undergraduate program in 3D digital design and collaborated on research combining computer graphics with live theatrical performance.

== Career ==
Before entering academia, Schweppe worked in theatrical design in New York City. She joined RIT in 1993 and retired in December 2021. During her time there, she helped develop more than 40 courses, built a graduate curriculum in computer animation, and established RIT's Bachelor of Fine Arts program in 3D digital design; the program's first class graduated in 2011.

Schweppe chaired the art gallery for SIGGRAPH 1999. The exhibition, titled technOasis, presented work combining art and technology. Reviewing the conference for Animation World Magazine, Jennifer Champagne said that the gallery's works were representative of SIGGRAPH's purpose.

== Virtual theatre research ==
Schweppe collaborated with computer scientist Joe Geigel on systems that combined virtual performers, human actors, and audience participation. In a 2004 conference paper, they described a framework in which audience members could affect a theatrical story and interact with virtual performers.

A later paper by researchers at the University of North Carolina at Charlotte discussed Geigel and Schweppe's work as a theatrical experience in which participants controlled virtual actors.

In 2016, Schweppe was among the collaborators who developed Farewell to Dawn, a mixed-reality dance performance in which dancers moved between physical and virtual stages. Motion-capture data controlled virtual performers, while augmented-reality technology allowed the dancers to see the virtual environment in relation to the physical performance space.

Schweppe and Geigel wrote about using live virtual theatre to teach computer-graphics students teamwork and communication skills.

== Women of Rochester Dress ==
Schweppe conceived the Women of Rochester Dress, a collaborative artwork about women connected with Rochester, New York. She contributed research, design work, and 3D models to the project. The finished dress incorporated the names of more than 100 women and was exhibited at Women's Rights National Historical Park in 2017.

It was later placed on permanent display in the park's museum.
