= Hunt House (Waterloo, New York) =

Historic house in New York, United States

- U.S. National Register of Historic Places
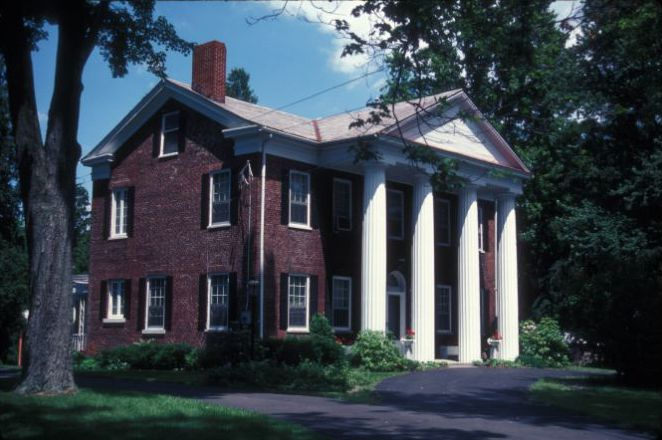

- Location within New York Location within the United States
- Location: 401 E. Main St., Waterloo, New York
- Coordinates: 42°54′9″N 76°50′40″W
- Area: 1.9 acres (0.77 ha)
- Built: 1848
- MPS: Women's Rights Historic Sites TR
- NRHP reference No.: 80000358
- Added to NRHP: August 29, 1980

Hunt House is a historic home located at Waterloo in Seneca County, New York. It was built about 1830 and is a two-story brick dwelling with a distinctive pedimented portico supported by four Doric order columns. The home was renovated to its current appearance in the 1920s. The home is notable as the residence of Mrs. Jane C. Hunt who, on July 13, 1848, invited Lucretia Mott, Elizabeth Cady Stanton, Martha Coffin Wright, and Mary Ann M'Clintock to it to plan the First Women's Rights Convention in the United States.

Hunt House was listed on the National Register of Historic Places in 1980. It is one of the sites of the Women's Rights National Historical Park but is currently closed for public tours.
