= Thomas M'Clintock =

American abolitionist (1792–1876)

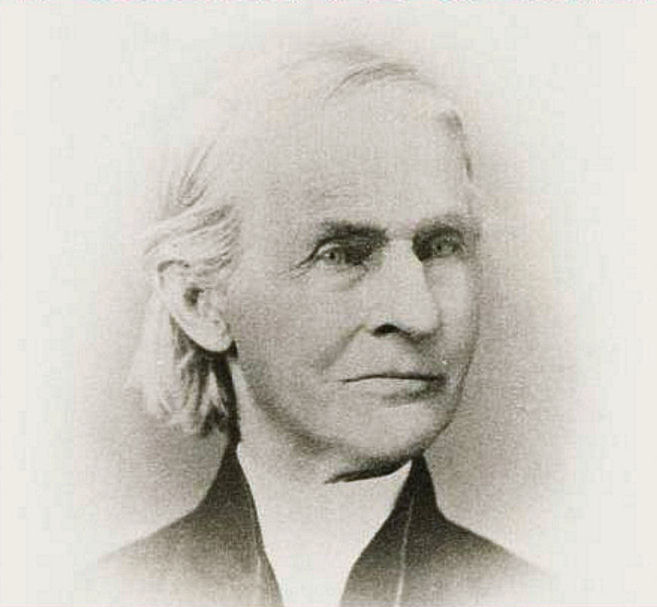
- Born: Thomas McClintock; March 28, 1792; Brandywine Hundred, Delaware, U.S.
- Died: March 19, 1876 (aged 83); Philadelphia, Pennsylvania, U.S.
- Occupation: Pharmacist
- Known for: Driving force in abolitionism
- Spouse: Mary Ann Wilson (m. 1820)

Thomas M'Clintock (March 28, 1792 – March 19, 1876) was an American pharmacist and a leading Quaker organizer for many reforms, including abolishing slavery, achieving women's rights, and modernizing Quakerism.

== Life ==
He was born on March 28, 1792 in Delaware, the son of Thomas and Mary Allen M'Clintock. Thomas's father was a Presbyterian, and his mother a Quaker, although their marriage resulted in her being removed from the Quaker rolls for marrying out of meeting.

Thomas became a druggist or pharmacist, which at the time would have been achieved through an apprenticeship. Thomas became a Quaker by commitment in 1811. At age twenty-two, Thomas began working as a druggist, opening his own store in Philadelphia, and six years later, in 1820, he married Mary Ann Wilson in Burlington, New Jersey. They began their life together in Philadelphia, where they lived for the first seventeen years of their marriage, and where Thomas M'Clintock began his involvement in abolitionism. During their years there, Thomas and Mary Ann had six children, five of whom lived to adulthood.

In 1827, M'Clintock co-founded the Free Produce Society of Pennsylvania along with James Mott, Richard Allen, and others and became its first secretary. This predominantly Quaker movement, which included also free African Americans, was an effort to promote the exchange of goods not involving any slave labor. In doing so, the members hoped to create a demand for "free" produce. The society felt their agenda was a peaceful and reasonable way to combat slavery. Thomas applied those principles throughout his life.

That same year M'Clintock was an instrumental force in the Hicksite Schism. This separation among the Quakers resulted from disagreements as to what role doctrine should play in the church, how much one should participate in social activism, and other factors. His extensive knowledge of early Quaker theology was used to prepare arguments against Orthodox Quakers. His arguments caused so much tension that even ten years later, in 1836, he and his family chose to move to Waterloo, New York.

While there, the M'Clintocks more actively aligned themselves with William Lloyd Garrison and his American Anti-Slavery Society. The M'Clintocks participated in petition campaigns, anti-slavery fairs, hosted numerous anti-slavery speakers and were founding members of the Western New York Anti-Slavery Society. In 1843, Thomas was elected to the board of managers of the American Anti-Slavery Society and later served as a vice president for a number of years. M'Clintock actively championed abolition, temperance, and Native American rights. Thomas and his wife organized anti-slavery petitions, gave refuge to black children, and continued the Free Produce movement.

Religion has been emphatically embodied, not in speculative theories, but in practical righteousness.

— Thomas M'Clintock, 1840

Several issues created divisions within the Hicksite branch of the Quakers in the 1840s, including whether ministers and elders should be able to discipline members, whether Quakers should be allowed to mix with non-Quakers in reform organizations, and the status of women within the organization. The M'Clintocks played important roles in the 1848 schism of Hicksite Quakers in western New York and the subsequent formation of the Yearly Meeting of Congregational Friends. Thomas M'Clintock wrote the new organization's Basis for Association, which specified that the organization would have no ministers, that no member would be subordinate to another, and that men and women would meet together with equal powers, not separately. Members were not bound by creed or doctrine, and membership was open to non-Quakers. Similar organizations were organized afterwards in other locations, including the Pennsylvania Yearly Meeting of Progressive Friends.

Thomas's wife, Mary Ann, was a major force in organizing the Seneca Falls Convention, the first women's rights convention. She attended the famous tea party in the Hunt house where the idea for a convention was first discussed. The original Declaration of Sentiments was then written at the M'Clintock house by Elizabeth Cady Stanton, Mary Ann and probably Elizabeth M'Clintock and Mary M'Clintock. Thomas may have been involved in those discussions, but there is no direct record of that. He did chair one of the sessions of the subsequent convention and gave a speech in support of the declaration. The entire M'Clintock family was involved in this convention, and they helped to organize a follow-up convention, the Rochester Women's Rights Convention of 1848, two weeks later in Rochester, New York.

By 1860, at age sixty-eight, Thomas M'Clintock had moved back to Philadelphia with his family. Thomas returned to his trade as a pharmacist until about 1866. He died on March 19, 1876 at age eighty-three. His wife died eight years later on May 21, 1884.

== Legacy ==
Thomas M'Clintock is remembered for his contributions to the anti-slavery movement and his impact on the first women's rights movements. The home in Waterloo, New York where the family resided during July 1848 was listed on the National Register of Historic Places in 1980 as the M'Clintock House.

== See also ==
- List of suffragists and suffragettes
- M'Clintock House
- Women's Rights National Historical Park
