= Catharine Paine Blaine =

American suffragist and teacher

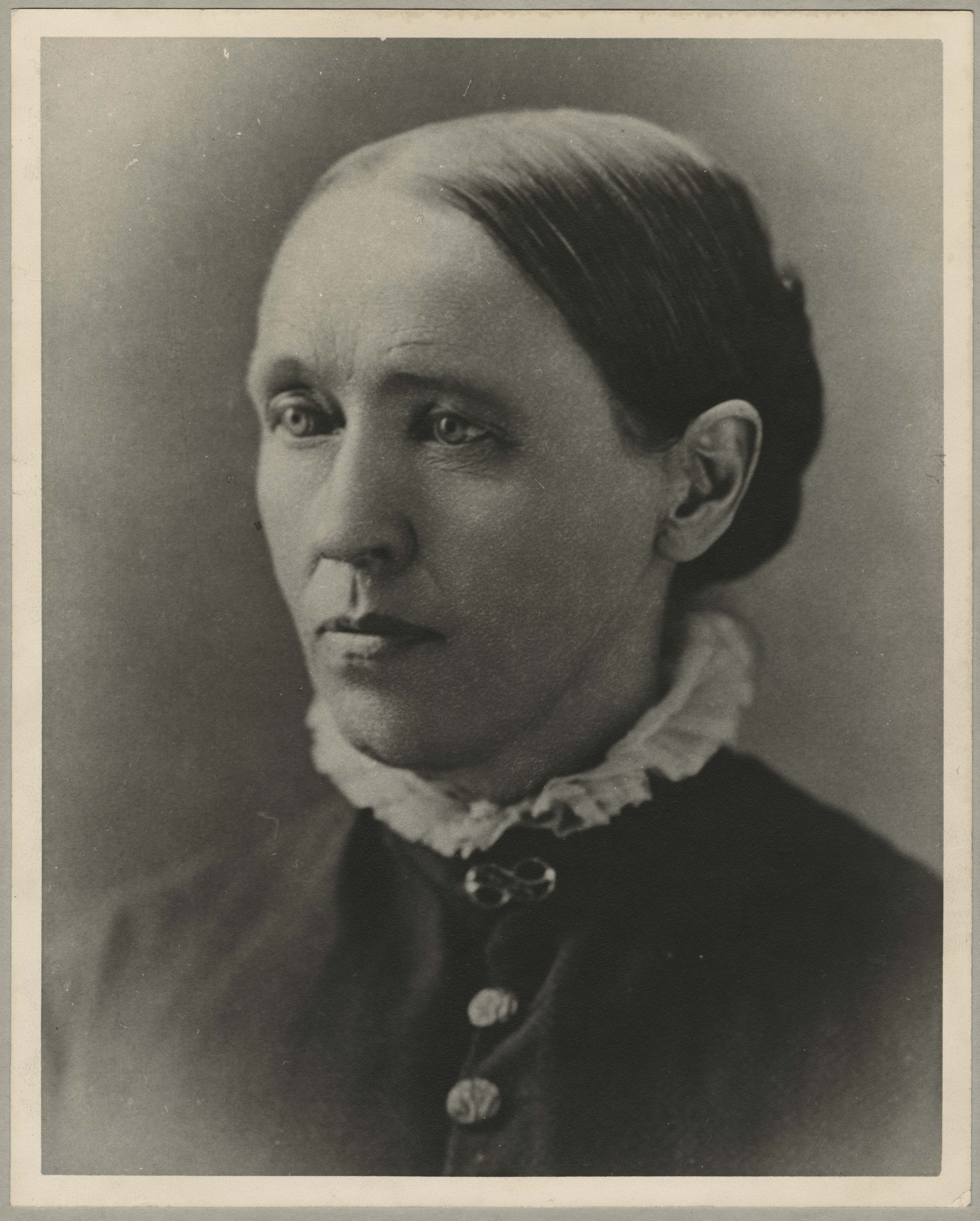
- Blaine, ca. 1880
- Born: December 14, 1829; Amenia, New York
- Died: March 9, 1908 (aged 78); Seattle, Washington
- Resting place: Mt. Pleasant Cemetery
- Other name: Catharine V. Paine
- Occupations: Teacher, suffragist, abolitionist

Catharine Paine Blaine was an American suffragist, abolitionist, teacher, and early pioneer. She is one of the 100 signers of the Declaration of Sentiments and was the first schoolteacher in Seattle.

== Life and work ==
Catharine Paine was born on December 14, 1829 in Amenia, New York. Her parents were both abolitionists, and her family moved to progressive Seneca Falls, New York when she was young. Growing up, Blaine wrote in her diary about opposition to slavery and her impressions from reading Uncle Tom's Cabin.

In 1848, Blaine was a signer of the Declaration of Sentiments at the Seneca Falls Convention, one of two teenagers to sign. This document called for the granting of equal rights between men and women. She also was an adopter of the Bloomer Costume, which favored short skirts for women over long pants.

Catharine married minister David Blaine in 1853, and they both moved to Seattle. Upon arriving, she and her husband stayed with Mary and Arthur Denny, who was a member of the Seattle legislature. Arthur introduced a bill in 1854 granting women the right to vote, but the bill failed to pass. Blaine is credited with bringing the ideas of the Seneca Falls Convention to the Washington territories.

In 1854, Blaine became Seattle's first schoolteacher, eventually teaching grade school out of her own house. During this time period, Blaine wrote numerous letters back to family and friends in New York, providing insight into pioneering life. Blaine also expressed racist sentiment towards Native Americans, and moved to Portland after the Battle of Seattle in 1856. They returned to Seattle in 1882.

Women were not granted the right to vote in the Washington Territories until 1883. Blaine's name appears on the 1885 voter registration roles from Seattle's Third Ward, becoming the first woman signer of the Declaration of Sentiments to officially register to vote. However, it is not definitively established if Blaine actually cast a vote.

== Death and legacy ==
Blaine died at her family home on March 9, 1908 in Seattle.

Stephanie Rogers writes that Blaine's progressive ideals and dedication to women's suffrage "denote a compassionate and thinking woman of unusual intelligence". She is called a "woman of firsts", both signing the Declaration of Sentiments and opening the first school within Seattle, the latter of which is remembered through the naming of the Catharine Blaine Elementary School in Magnolia.

== See also ==
- Women's suffrage movement in Washington
