= Charlotte Woodward Pierce =

American suffragist

Charlotte Lundley Woodward Peirce
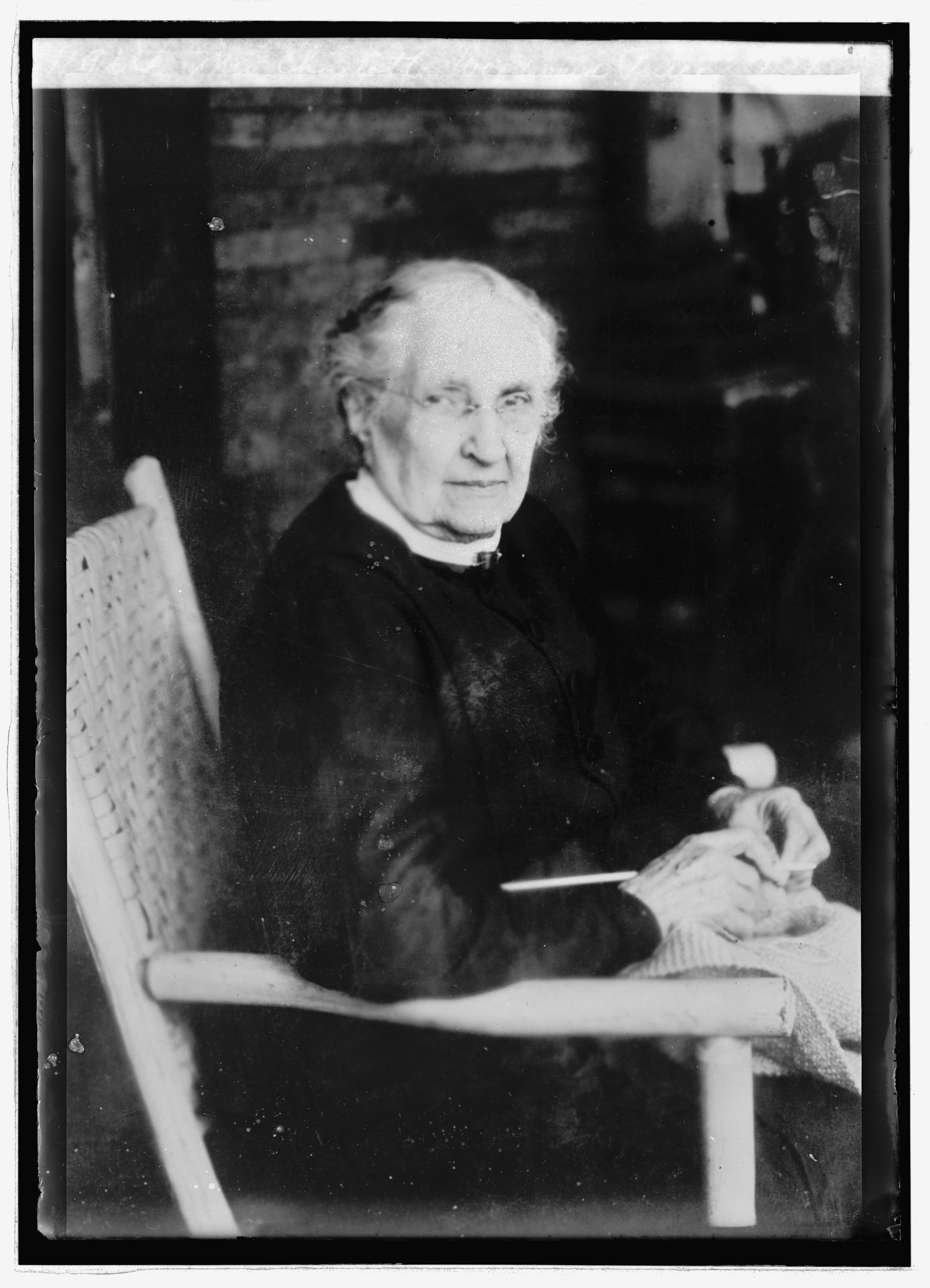
- Born: Charlotte Woodward; January 14, 1830; Waterloo, New York
- Died: March 15, 1924 (aged 94); Philadelphia, Pennsylvania, U.S.
- Known for: Only woman to sign the Declaration of Sentiments and live to see the passing of the 19th Amendment

Charlotte Woodward Pierce (January 14, 1830 – March 15, 1924) was the only woman to sign the Declaration of Sentiments at the 1848 Seneca Falls Convention and live to see the passing of the 19th Amendment in 1920. She was the only one of the 68 women who signed the Declaration to see the day that women could vote nationwide. On July 19, 1848, 19-year-old Pierce travelled to Seneca Falls with 6 of her closest friends by wagon upon hearing about the Convention. It was not for many years, until 1920 when Pierce was 91 when she was able to witness the first election in which she was eligible to vote.

== Teenage years ==
Charlotte Woodward Pierce was born in 1830 in Waterloo, New York, to a Quaker family. After working as a schoolteacher at the age of 15, she became an independent seamstress, working out of the home of Moses and Hannah Chapman in 1848. All of the wages she earned from sewing gloves from leather went to Moses Chapman in exchange for her living arrangements. This working situation ignited in Pierce an awareness for the oppression of the women of her era. As a result, she participated in the Seneca Falls Convention to fight for greater opportunities for women. Because she was working at the time, she wanted all women to be able to choose their area of work and wages, which was something she and many other women could not do at the time.

== Political work after 1848 ==
In the years after Seneca Falls, Pierce continued her work to further women's rights. She joined the American Women's Suffrage Association (AWSA) and was also acquainted with famous suffragist and social reformer Susan B. Anthony. In addition, she became active in the Association for the Advancement of Women. Pierce outwardly opposed the creation of the National Woman's Party (NWP), expressing her belief that women should join existing political parties instead of consolidating their votes together in their own party.

Despite her original disapproval of the NWP, she sent a trowel to the NWP to be used to help place a cornerstone for the party's headquarters in Washington. The trowel read, "in memory of the Seneca Falls Convention in 1848: presented by its sole survivor, Mrs. Charlotte L. Pierce, in thanksgiving for progress made by women and in honor of the National Woman's Party, which will carry on the struggle so bravely begun."

== 1920 election ==
After the ratification of the 19th Amendment, the 1920 presidential election of Warren G. Harding was American women's first opportunity for enfranchised political engagement. Charlotte Woodward Pierce was the only remaining woman from Seneca Falls present and excited for the election, but unfortunately for Pierce, who was 91 at the time, her deteriorating health kept her from exercising her right to vote. She was bedridden and going blind, which kept her from going to the polls that day and voting for a candidate. Because of her health issues, Pierce never managed to exercise the right to vote she and her deceased peers worked for.
