= M'Clintock House =

Historic house in New York, United States

- U.S. National Register of Historic Places
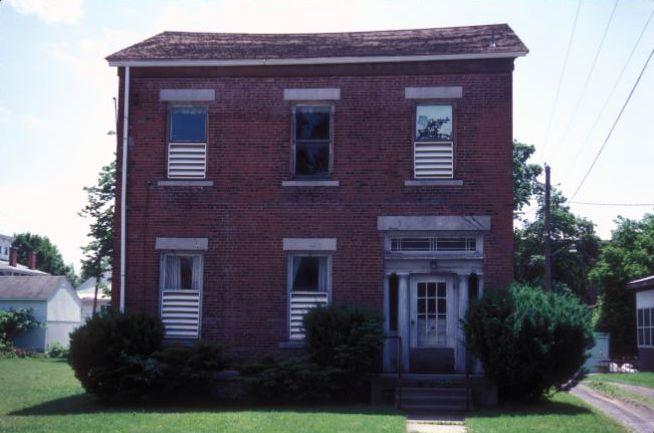

- Location within New York Location within the United States
- Location: 14 E. Williams, Waterloo, New York
- Coordinates: 42°54′19″N 76°51′42″W
- Area: 0.3 acres (0.12 ha)
- Built: 1848
- Architectural style: Federal
- MPS: Women's Rights Historic Sites TR
- NRHP reference No.: 80000360
- Added to NRHP: August 29, 1980

M'Clintock House, also known as the Baptist Parsonage, is a historic home located at Waterloo in Seneca County, New York. It is a two-story, Federal style brick dwelling built in 1833–1836. The home is notable as the residence of Quaker pharmacist Thomas M'Clintock and his wife Mary Ann from 1836 to 1856. On July 16, 1848, the home was the location where the Declaration of Sentiments and other resolutions and speeches were drawn up for the subsequent First Women's Rights Convention.

It was listed on the National Register of Historic Places in 1980.

The house is one of the sites of the Women's Rights National Historical Park. The restored mid-19th century home is open for tours in summer.

== See also ==
- List of monuments and memorials to women's suffrage
- Votes For Women History Trail
- Timeline of women's suffrage
- Women's suffrage in the United States
