= Mary Ann M'Clintock =

American suffragist and abolitionist

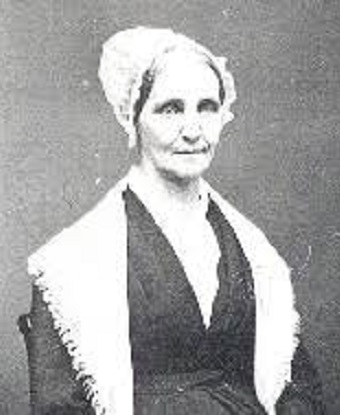
- Born: February 20, 1800; Burlington, New Jersey, US
- Died: May 21, 1884 (aged 84); Philadelphia, Pennsylvania, US
- Occupations: Abolitionist, suffragist
- Spouse: Thomas M'Clintock (m. 1820; died 1875)

Mary Ann M'Clintock or Mary Ann McClintock (1800–1884) was a strong advocate for both Women's Right's and the abolition movement. She is best remembered for her role in founding the First Women's Rights Convention of Seneca Falls, as well as the Western New York Anti-Slavery Society.

== Early life ==
Born Mary Ann Wilson in Burlington, New Jersey, M'Clintock was raised in a Quaker home. At some point early in Wilson's childhood, she moved to West Chester, PA, where, by 1814, she attended Westtown School. By 1820, she was married to Thomas M'Clintock, a fellow socially progressive Quaker. Shortly after their union, M'Clintock began having children. Between 1821 and 1831, M'Clintock had five children: Elizabeth, Mary Ann, Sarah, Charles, and Julia.

M'Clintock lived in Philadelphia until 1836 when she and her family moved to Waterloo, New York. Because of their family connection to Richard Hunt (a wealthy activist already residing in Waterloo), the M'Clintocks were able to integrate quickly into the community. Subsidized by Hunt, the M'Clintocks moved into a large two-story home at 14 E. Williams St., Waterloo, New York, where they hosted fellow progressive Quakers and activists. It was in Waterloo that M'Clintock began, in earnest, her career in advocacy and organization.

== Career of advocacy ==
M'Clintock began her work in advocacy in 1833, when she was very active in the anti-slavery movements throughout Philadelphia. She had a strong influence within Quaker communities, where she was often recognized as a leader and minister. M'Clintock was one of the founding members of the Philadelphia Female Anti-Slavery Society. It was in founding this group that she met fellow abolitionist Lucretia Mott. Mott served as a mentor to M'Clintock, showing her how to organize and motivate local movements.

Once she moved to Waterloo, Mary Ann took a more active role in both the women's rights and abolitionist movement. M'Clintock's half-sister Margaret Pryor connected the family to a network of fellow Quaker abolitionists. It was this connection that encouraged M'Clintock to turn her home into a safe haven on the Underground Railroad. Sometime soon after arriving in Waterloo, the M'Clintocks purchased a drugstore, which became a further outlet for their advocacy. Upstairs they hosted temperance meetings and ran a small school which emphasized progressive ideals. Downstairs they operated as members of the Free Produce Society, which meant only selling items made free from slave labor. M'Clintock's daughter, Elisabeth, idolized her mother and wanted to follow in her footsteps, fighting for social change. Mary Ann saw the drugstore as a way to get her involved in the movement, so she chose to place Elisabeth in charge of the business operations of the store. This freed up both Mary Ann and Thomas to focus on social organizing. They worked together to raise funding for the Irish famine, the Hungarian Revolution, and for the impoverished people of Waterloo.

In 1842, M'Clintock helped establish the Western New York Anti-Slavery Society, assisting in organizing the meetings, spreading word about the group, and writing its constitution. This chapter became a significant organization, hosting notable speakers such as Frederick Douglass.

In July of 1848, M'Clintock was one of five founders of the First Women's Rights Convention, held at Seneca Falls. She hosted all five founding members at her house and was largely responsible for facilitating discussions. It was during the Seneca Falls convention that M'Clintock, alongside her daughters and Elizabeth Cady Stanton, wrote the Declaration of Sentiments, a condemnation of United States gender dynamics and modeled after the Declaration of Independence.

M'Clintock was also an active member in Quaker politics. She took issue with the prevalent idea that different denominations of Christianity could not cooperate. M'Clintock believed that Quakers could create large-scale social change if they were willing to cooperate with all denominations of Christians. For this reason, in October of 1848, M'Clintock established the Progressive Friends, or Friends of Human Progress. While living in Waterloo, M'Clintock served the clerk for every meeting of the group.

== Death and legacy ==
In 1856, M'Clintock retired and return to Philadelphia. While she remained active in her local Quaker community, M'Clintock did not take on any further roles in activism.

M'Clintock's husband, Thomas, passed away in 1875. She lived as a widow until May 21, 1884. At the age of 84, M'Clintock died from an unknown illness. She is buried in the Fair Hill Burial Ground in Philadelphia.

She is predominantly remembered for her work establishing the First Women's Rights Convention in Seneca Falls. Her daughter, Elisabeth, continued to fight for women's suffrage, living a life inspired by her mother.

== See also ==
- List of suffragists and suffragettes
- M'Clintock House
- Women's Rights National Historical Park
- Seneca Falls Convention
- Declaration of Sentiments
