= Wesleyan Methodist Church (Seneca Falls, New York) =

Historic church in New York, United States

- U.S. National Register of Historic Places
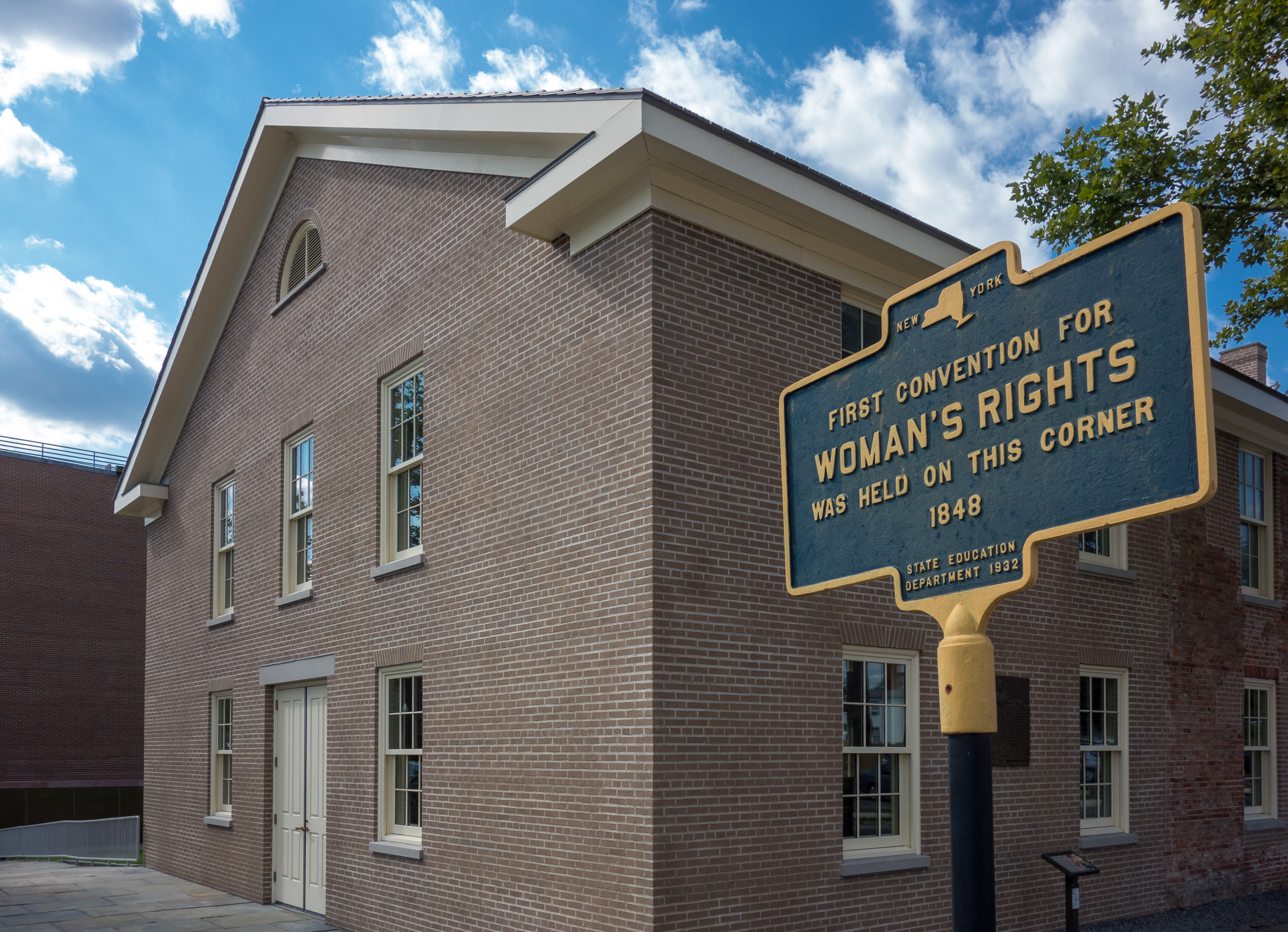

- Location within New York Location within the United States
- Location: 126 Fall St., Seneca Falls, New York
- Coordinates: 42.9137°N 76.7978°W
- Area: 0.2 acres (0.081 ha)
- Built: 1843
- MPS: Women's Rights Historic Sites TR
- NRHP reference No.: 80000361
- Added to NRHP: August 29, 1980

Wesleyan Methodist Church is a historic Wesleyan church located at Seneca Falls in Seneca County, New York. It was constructed in 1843. All interior features have been removed and three original walls stand.

The church was the site of the 1848 Seneca Falls Convention, the first women's rights convention, where about 300 people gathered to hear Elizabeth Cady Stanton demand the right of women to vote.

In 1869 a section of the church broke away and established the First Congregational Church of Seneca Falls. The remaining Wesleyan congregation moved to a new location and sold the church in 1873.

It was listed on the National Register of Historic Places in 1980 and now forms part of the Women's Rights National Historic Park. Pews from the First Congregational Church are now installed in the Wesleyan church.

== See also ==
- List of monuments and memorials to women's suffrage
