= Women's Rights National Historical Park =

Historic park and museum in New York, US

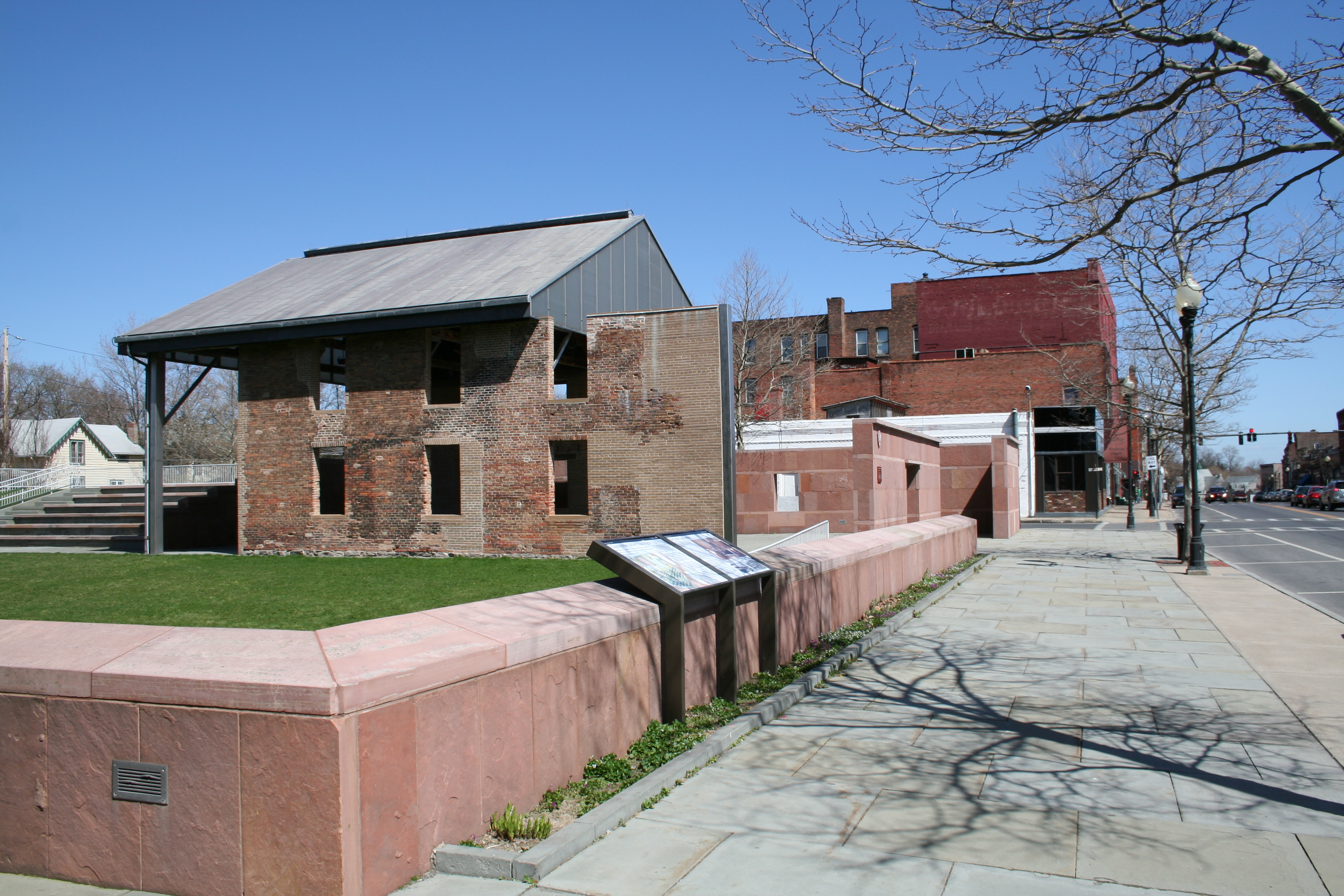
- The remains of the Wesleyan Chapel, seen in 2007 prior to restoration

- Location within New York Location within the United States
- Location: Seneca County, New York, USA
- Nearest city: Seneca Falls, NY
- Coordinates: 42°54′39″N 76°48′05″W
- Area: 7.44 acres (0.0301 km^{2})
- Established: December 28, 1980
- Visitors: 34,294 (in 2022)
- Governing body: National Park Service
- Website: Women's Rights National Historical Park

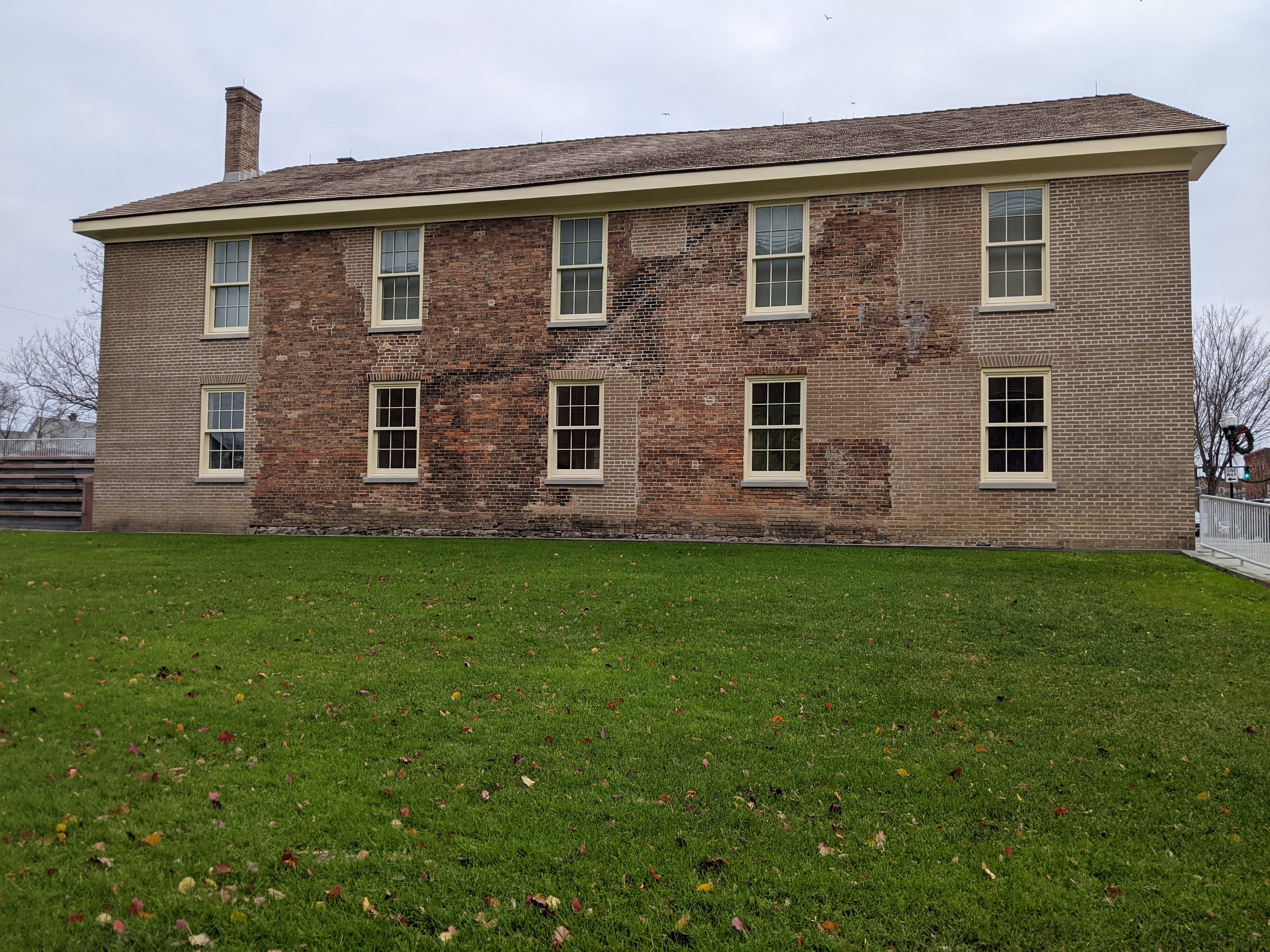
The Wesleyan Chapel's renovation was completed in 2011 and preserved three of the original walls. Photographed December 2021.

The Women's Rights National Historical Park is a United States National Historical Park in Seneca Falls and Waterloo, New York, United States. Founded by an act of Congress in 1980, the park was first opened in 1982. It gradually expanded through purchases over the following decades. It recognizes the site of the 1848 Seneca Falls Convention, the first women's rights convention, and the homes of several women's rights activists.

The park consists of four major historical properties: the Wesleyan Methodist Church, which was the site of the Seneca Falls Convention, the Elizabeth Cady Stanton House, the M'Clintock House and the Richard Hunt House. The park also includes a visitor center and an education and cultural center.

== Background ==
Seneca Falls and Waterloo, New York, were important sites in the history of the fight for women's suffrage in the United States, as the site of the 1848 Seneca Falls Convention on July 19 and 20. The convention drew over 300 attendees, many of whom signed the Declaration of Sentiments which was produced as a part of the convention. The Declaration of Sentiments, the convention's defining document, which declared that "all men and women are created equal." The conference was attended by notable figures in the movement, including Elizabeth Cady Stanton, Susan B. Anthony, Lucretia Mott, and Frederick Douglass. The towns also held the homes of several suffragists in the 19th century, including Stanton.

By 1980, the Methodist church had fallen into disrepair: portions had been converted into a laundromat, a car garage, and apartments. While homes that some of these women's rights activists had lived in still stood, many were privately occupied and in poor condition.

== Early history ==
=== Establishment ===
Efforts to establish a National Park in Seneca Falls and Waterloo began in the late 20th century. Daniel Patrick Moynihan, a senator from New York, was a supporter of the park and submitted legislation to Congress suggesting its foundation.

On December 28, 1980, United States Congress formally authorized creation of a "Women's Rights National Historical Park", with the passage of Pub. L. 96–607. The legislation recognized five buildings as having particular historic interest: the Wesleyan Methodist Church, the Elizabeth Cady Stanton House, M'Clintock House, Richard Hunt House, and Amelia Bloomer House. The legislation established the park with a mission to:

preserve and interpret for the education, inspiration and benefit of present and future generations, the nationally significant historical and cultural sites and structures associated with the struggle for equal rights for women and to cooperate with State and local entities to preserve the character and historic setting of such sites and structures.

=== Growth ===
Although it had been created, the park did not own all the property outlined in legislation. The National Park Service (NPS) was permitted by the legislation to acquire the Wesleyan Church, the Stanton House, and the M'Clintock House. The $11,000 Stanton House purchase was funded by Alan Alda, undertaken by the Elizabeth Cady Stanton foundation, and donated to the park. The park was dedicated two years after it was established, in July 1982. The dedication ceremony was attended by 3,000 people, and Alda was the keynote speaker. Many present at the dedication protested in favor of the Equal Rights Amendment, though the NPS made it clear they did not want the park to become politicized.

Led by the park's first superintendent, Judy Hart, the NPS first focused on restoring the Stanton House. A 1985 profile described this work as the "most extreme historical restoration ever undertaken by the NPS."

The park gradually expanded across the decades that followed. They undertook a large redevelopment plan, including renovating the church and the development of a park and visitor center. In 1985 the M'Clintock House was purchased for the park, and two years later the NPS announced a competition to design the complex that would include the park's visitor center around the Church. While the NPS suggested that the design be a "re-imagination" of the Church, because no information existed about its original design, others, including Moynihan, contended that efforts should be made to fully restore it. By this point, only two walls of the Church and 75% of its roof remained.

In 1989 they purchased the rest of the block containing the Wesleyan Church, a .28 acres (0.11 ha) parcel. The visitor center was opened in July 1993, near the Church. It is two stories tall, holding various exhibits relating to women's suffrage and gender equality. By 1998, the park had been fully developed: known as Declaration Park, it includes a waterfall, landscaped grounds, and a stone wall with the Declaration of Sentiments written on it. By 1999, the park held 5.7 acres (2.3 ha) of land.

In 2000, the Hunt House, which had previously been owned by private owners, was placed on auction. Despite fears that it would be again bought by a private citizen, the house was purchased by the nonprofit Trust For Public Land for $231,000. The Trust announced that it would donate the building to the park and work on restoration. Half of the funding was provided by the National Trust for Historic Preservation, and half by the Trust For Public Land. The park itself was prohibited from reaching out to the previous owners of the house.

== Later history ==
In 1998 the park held celebrations recognizing the 150th anniversary of the Seneca Falls convention which were attended by over 14,000 people. As part of the event, Hillary Clinton delivered a speech. By 2005, the park had not achieved as much recognition as the organizers initially hoped, with about 500,000 visitors since opening. Park officials attributed this in part to their location and in part to the lengthy process of establishing and developing the park. The M'Clintock house opened after restoration and repair work in the early 2000s. As of 2006, the Hunt house was still undergoing work. Restoration work had not been undertaken on the Methodist Church, while the Stanton house had already been almost fully restored to its state in the late 1840s.

In the later half of the 2010s, the park accumulated a backlog of necessary maintenance tasks: in 2015, the repairs needed were estimated at $1.4 million, with over $800,000 of it "critical" repairs. This had risen to $4.6 million in 2017 and $5.4 million in 2018. Necessary repairs were concentrated at the visitor center, but also present in several of the historic homes. In 2022, there were an estimated $11 million needed repairs.

As of 2014, the park offered tours from rangers, and self-guided tours. In addition to its visitor center, the park has an education and cultural center housing the Suffrage Press Printshop. The park's holdings are not in one continuous place, but are instead spread out over 5 miles (8.0 km). It had 34,294 visitors in 2022. As of March 31, 2023, the park held 7.03 acres (2.84 ha) of land.

In 2026, the National Trust for Historic Preservation listed the location on their annual "America’s 11 Most Endangered Historic Places" due to deferred maintenance.

== The First Wave ==
The Visitor Center lobby houses a large, life-size bronze sculpture, The First Wave, which consists of twenty figures representing women and men who attended the first Women's Rights Convention. Nine of the sculpture's figures represent actual participants and organizers of the convention: Elizabeth Cady Stanton, Lucretia Mott, Mary Ann M'Clintock, Martha Wright, Jane Hunt, Frederick Douglass, James Mott, Thomas M'Clintock, and Richard Hunt. The other eleven figures represent the anonymous women and men who participated in the convention. Many of the participants signed the Declaration of Sentiments.

== Superintendents ==
- Judy Hart - 1982-1989
- Linda Canzanelli - 1989-1994
- Joanne Hanley - 1994-1997
- Josie Fernandez -1998-2004
- Tina Orcutt's - 2004-2011
- Tammy Duchesne- 2011 - 2013
- Noemi "Ami" Ghazala – 2013 - 2019
- Andrea (Andie) DeKoter – 2019
- Ahna Wilson – 2021 to current

== Votes For Women History Trail ==
The Votes For Women History Trail, created as part of the federal Omnibus Public Land Management Act of 2009, is administered by the Department of the Interior through the Women's Rights National Historical Park. The Trail is an automobile route that links sites throughout upstate New York important to the establishment of women's suffrage.

Sites on the trail include:

- Susan B. Anthony House in Rochester
- Mount Hope Cemetery in Rochester
- Antoinette Louisa Brown Blackwell Childhood Home in Henrietta
- M'Clintock House in Waterloo
- The Women's Rights National Historical Park itself

== See also ==
- List of monuments and memorials to women's suffrage
- Timeline of women's suffrage in the United States

== Bibliography ==
- Women's Rights National Historical Park: Draft General Management Plan/environmental Assessment. U.S. Department of the Interior, National Park Service. 1985.
