= Seneca Falls Convention =

First women's rights convention (1848)

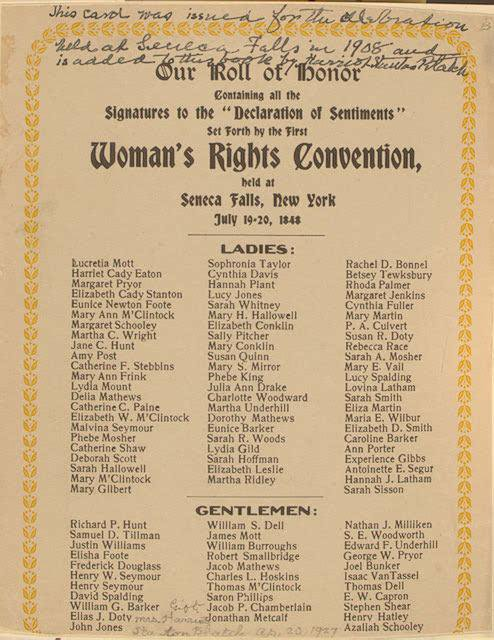
Signers of the Declaration of Sentiments at Seneca Falls in order: Lucretia Coffin Mott is on top of the list

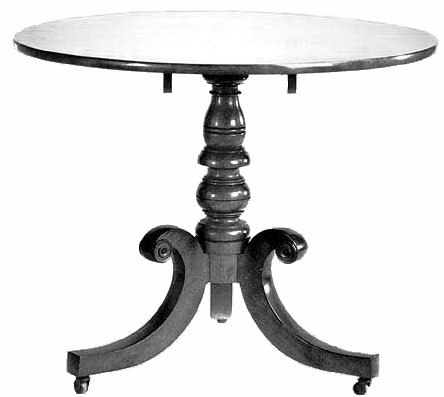
This mahogany tea table was used on July 16, 1848, to compose much of the first draft of the Declaration of Sentiments.

The Seneca Falls Convention was the first women's rights convention. Its organizers advertised it as "a convention to discuss the social, civil, and religious condition and rights of woman". Held in the Wesleyan Chapel of the town of Seneca Falls, New York, it spanned two days over July 19–20, 1848. Attracting widespread attention, it was soon followed by other women's rights conventions, including the Rochester Women's Rights Convention in Rochester, New York, two weeks later. In 1850 the first in a series of annual National Women's Rights Conventions met in Worcester, Massachusetts.

Female Quakers local to the area organized the meeting along with Elizabeth Cady Stanton, who was not a Quaker. They planned the event during a visit to the area by Philadelphia-based Lucretia Mott. Mott, a Quaker, was famous for her oratorical ability, which was rare for non-Quaker women during an era in which women were often not allowed to speak in public.

The meeting comprised six sessions including a lecture on law, a humorous presentation, and multiple discussions about the role of women in society. Stanton and the Quaker women presented two prepared documents, the Declaration of Sentiments and an accompanying list of resolutions, to be debated and modified before being put forward for signatures. A heated debate sprang up regarding women's right to vote, with many – including Mott – urging the removal of this concept, but Frederick Douglass, who was the convention's sole African American attendee, argued eloquently for its inclusion, and the suffrage resolution was retained. Exactly 100 of approximately 300 attendees signed the document, mostly women.

The convention was seen by some of its contemporaries, including featured speaker Mott, as one important step among many others in the continuing effort by women to gain for themselves a greater proportion of social, civil and moral rights, while it was viewed by others as a revolutionary beginning to the struggle by women for complete equality with men. Stanton considered the Seneca Falls Convention to be the beginning of the women's rights movement, an opinion that was echoed in the History of Woman Suffrage, which Stanton co-wrote.

The convention's Declaration of Sentiments became "the single most important factor in spreading news of the women's rights movement around the country in 1848 and into the future", according to Judith Wellman, a historian of the convention. By the time of the National Women's Rights Convention of 1851, the issue of women's right to vote had become a central tenet of the United States women's rights movement. These conventions became annual events until the outbreak of the American Civil War in 1861.

== Background ==
=== Reform movement ===
In the decades leading up to 1848, a small number of women began to push against restrictions imposed upon them by society. A few men aided in this effort. In 1831, Reverend Charles Grandison Finney began allowing women to pray aloud in gatherings of men and women. The Second Great Awakening was challenging women's traditional roles in religion. Recalling the era in 1870, Paulina Wright Davis set Finney's decision as the beginning of the American women's reform movement.

=== Women in abolition ===
Starting in 1832, abolitionist and journalist William Lloyd Garrison organized anti-slavery associations which encouraged the full participation of women. Garrison's ideas were not welcomed by a majority of other abolitionists, and those unwilling to include women split from his American Anti-Slavery Society to form other abolitionist societies.

A few women began to gain fame as writers and speakers on the subject of abolition. In the 1830s, Lydia Maria Child wrote to encourage women to write a will, and Frances Wright wrote books on women's rights and social reform. The Grimké sisters published their views against slavery in the late 1830s, and they began speaking to mixed gatherings of men and women for Garrison's American Anti-Slavery Society, as did Abby Kelley. Although these women lectured primarily on the evils of slavery, the fact that a woman was speaking in public was itself a noteworthy stand for the cause of women's rights. Ernestine Rose began lecturing in 1836 to groups of women on the subject of the "Science of Government" which included the enfranchisement of women.

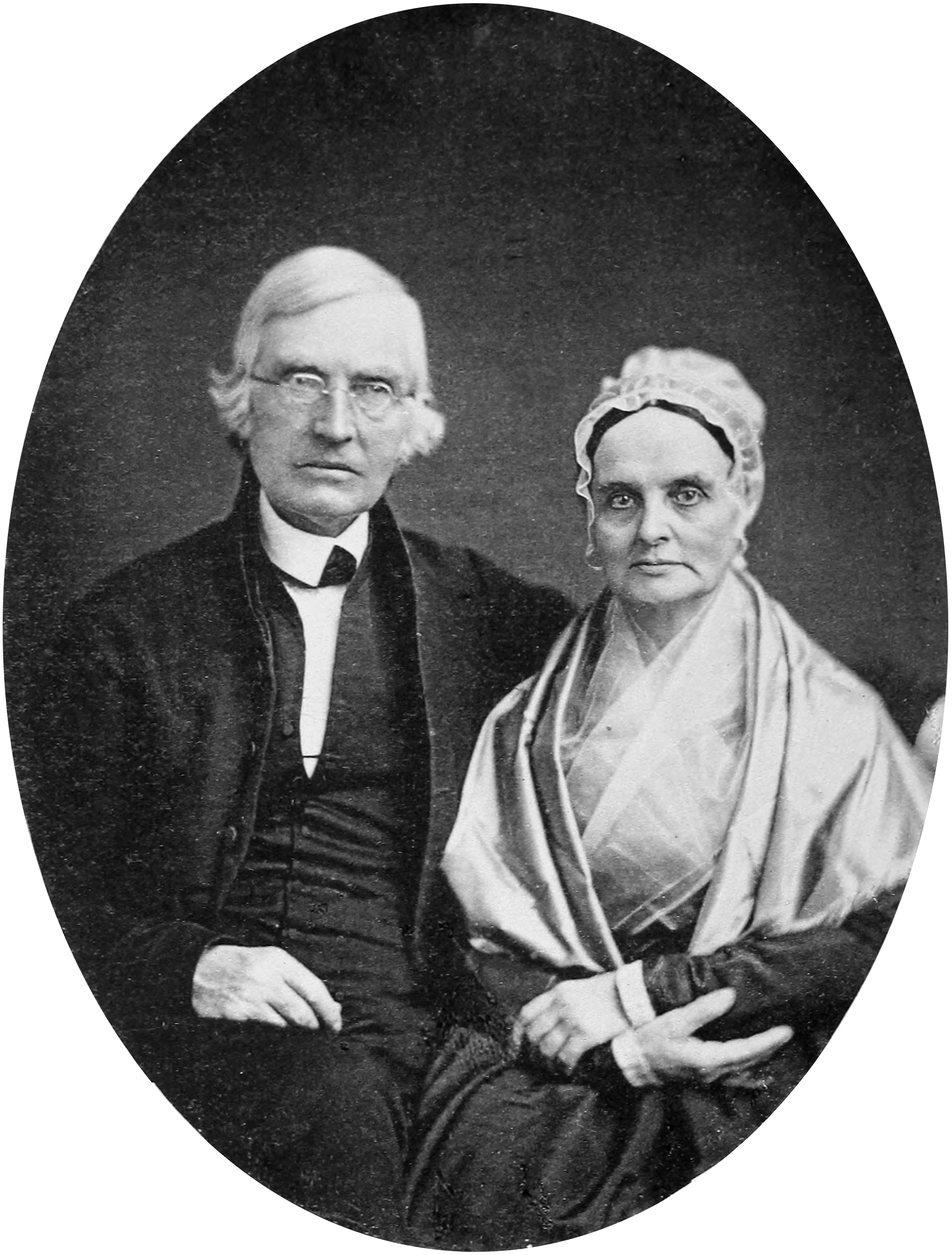
James and Lucretia Mott

In 1840, at the urging of Garrison and Wendell Phillips, Lucretia Coffin Mott and Elizabeth Cady Stanton traveled with their husbands and a dozen other American male and female abolitionists to London for the first World's Anti-Slavery Convention, with the expectation that the motion put forward by Phillips to include women's participation in the convention would be controversial. In London, the proposal was rebuffed after a full day of debate; the women were allowed to listen from the gallery but not allowed to speak or vote. Mott and Stanton became friends in London and on the return voyage and together planned to organize their own convention to further the cause of women's rights, separate from abolition concerns. In 1842 Thomas M'Clintock and his wife Mary Ann became founding members of the Western New York Anti-Slavery Society and helped write its constitution. When he moved to Rochester in 1847, Frederick Douglass joined Amy and Isaac Post and the M'Clintocks in this Rochester-based chapter of the American Anti-Slavery Society.

=== Women's rights ===
In 1839 in Boston, Margaret Fuller began hosting conversations, akin to French salons, among women interested in discussing the "great questions" facing their sex. Sophia Ripley was one of the participants. In 1843, Fuller published The Great Lawsuit, asking women to claim themselves as self-dependent.

In the 1840s, women in America were reaching out for greater control of their lives. Husbands and fathers directed the lives of women, and many doors were closed to female participation. State statutes and common law prohibited women from inheriting property, signing contracts, serving on juries and voting in elections. Women's prospects in employment were dim: they could expect only to gain a very few service-related jobs and were paid about half of what men were paid for the same work. In Massachusetts, Brook Farm was founded by Sophia Ripley and her husband George Ripley in 1841 as an attempt to find a way in which men and women could work together, with women receiving the same compensation as men. The experiment failed.

In the fall of 1841, Elizabeth Cady Stanton gave her first public speech, on the subject of the Temperance movement, in front of 100 women in Seneca Falls. She wrote to her friend Elizabeth J. Neal that she moved both the audience and herself to tears, saying "I infused into my speech a Homeopathic dose of woman's rights, as I take good care to do in many private conversations."

Lucretia Mott met with Elizabeth Cady Stanton in Boston in 1842, and discussed again the possibility of a woman's rights convention. They talked once more in 1847, prior to Stanton moving from Boston to Seneca Falls.

Women's groups led by Lucretia Mott and Paulina Wright Davis held public meetings in Philadelphia beginning in 1846. A wide circle of abolitionists friendly to women's rights began in 1847 to discuss the possibility of holding a convention wholly devoted to women's rights. In October 1847, Lucy Stone gave her first public speech on the subject of women's rights, entitled The Province of Women, at her brother Bowman Stone's church in Gardner, Massachusetts.

In March 1848, Garrison, the Motts, Abby Kelley Foster, Stephen Symonds Foster and others hosted an Anti-Sabbath meeting in Boston, to work toward the elimination of laws that apply only to Sunday, and to gain for the laborer more time away from toil than just one day of rest per week. Lucretia Mott and two other women were active within the executive committee, and Mott spoke to the assemblage. Lucretia Mott raised questions about the validity of blindly following religious and social tradition.

=== Political gains ===
On April 7, 1848, in response to a citizen's petition, the New York State Assembly passed the Married Woman's Property Act, giving women the right to retain the property they brought into a marriage, as well as property they acquired during the marriage. Creditors could not seize a wife's property to pay a husband's debts. Leading up to the passage of this law, in 1846, supporters issued a pamphlet, probably authored by Judge John Fine, which relied on its readers' familiarity with the United States Declaration of Independence to demand "That all are created free and equal ...", and that this idea should apply equally to the sexes. "Women, as well as men, are entitled to the full enjoyment of its practical blessings". A group of 44 married women of western New York wrote to the Assembly in March 1848, saying "your Declaration of Independence declares, that governments derive their just powers from the consent of the governed. And as women have never consented to, been represented in, or recognized by this government, it is evident that in justice no allegiance can be claimed from them ... Our numerous and yearly petitions for this most desirable object having been disregarded, we now ask your august body, to abolish all laws which hold married women more accountable for their acts than infants, idiots, and lunatics."

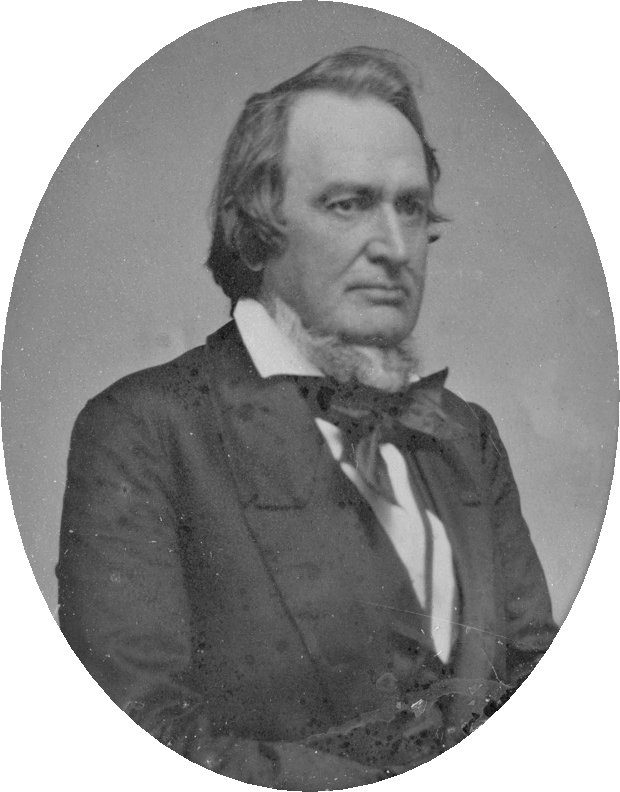
Gerrit Smith made woman suffrage a plank in the Liberty Party platform on June 14–15, 1848.

New York, however, was not the pioneer in this case. Already, in February 1839, Mississippi had enacted its own Married Women's Property Act, the first state law anywhere to allow married women to independently own and administer property, a statute which was expanded in 1846, 1857, 1868, 1880, and 1890. The General Assembly in Pennsylvania passed a similar married woman's property law a few weeks after New York, one which Lucretia Mott and others had championed. These progressive state laws were seen by American women as a sign of new hope for women's rights.

On June 2, 1848, in Rochester, New York, Gerrit Smith was nominated as the Liberty Party's presidential candidate. Smith was Elizabeth Cady Stanton's first cousin, and the two enjoyed debating and discussing political and social issues with each other whenever he came to visit. At the National Liberty Convention, held June 14–15 in Buffalo, New York, Smith gave a major address, including in his speech a demand for "universal suffrage in its broadest sense, females as well as males being entitled to vote." The delegates approved a passage in their party platform addressing votes for women: "Neither here, nor in any other part of the world, is the right of suffrage allowed to extend beyond one of the sexes. This universal exclusion of woman ... argues, conclusively, that, not as yet, is there one nation so far emerged from barbarism, and so far practically Christian, as to permit woman to rise up to the one level of the human family." At this convention, five votes were placed calling for Lucretia Mott to be Smith's vice-president—the first time in the United States that a woman was suggested for federal executive office.

=== Quaker influence ===
Many members of the Religious Society of Friends, known as Quakers, made their homes in western New York state, near Seneca Falls. A particularly progressive branch lived in and around Waterloo in Seneca County, New York. These Quakers strove for marital relationships in which men and women worked and lived in equality.

The M'Clintocks came to Waterloo from a Quaker community in Philadelphia. They rented property from Richard P. Hunt, a wealthy Quaker and businessman. The M'Clintock and Hunt families opposed slavery; both participated in the free produce movement, and their houses served as stations on the Underground Railroad.

Though women Friends had since the 1660s publicly preached, written and led, and traditional Quaker tenets held that men and women were equals, Quaker women met separately from the men to consider and decide a congregation's business. By the 1840s, some Hicksite Quakers determined to bring women and men together in their business meetings as an expression of their spiritual equality. In June 1848, approximately 200 Hicksites, including the Hunts and the M'Clintocks, formed an even more radical Quaker group, known as the Yearly Meeting of Congregational Friends, or Progressive Friends. The Progressive Friends intended to further elevate the influence of women in affairs of the faith. They introduced joint business meetings of men and women, giving women an equal voice.

== Planning ==
Lucretia and James Mott visited central and western New York in the summer of 1848 for a number of reasons. They visited the Cattaraugus Reservation of the Seneca Nation, which was then part of the Iroquois Confederacy; women of that nation were known to enjoy a strong position. The Motts also visited former slaves living in the province of Ontario, Canada. Mott was present at the meeting in which the Progressive Friends left the Hicksite Quakers. They also visited Lucretia's sister Martha Coffin Wright in Auburn, NY, where Mott preached to prisoners at the Auburn State Penitentiary. Her skill and fame as an orator drew crowds wherever she went.

=== Announcement ===
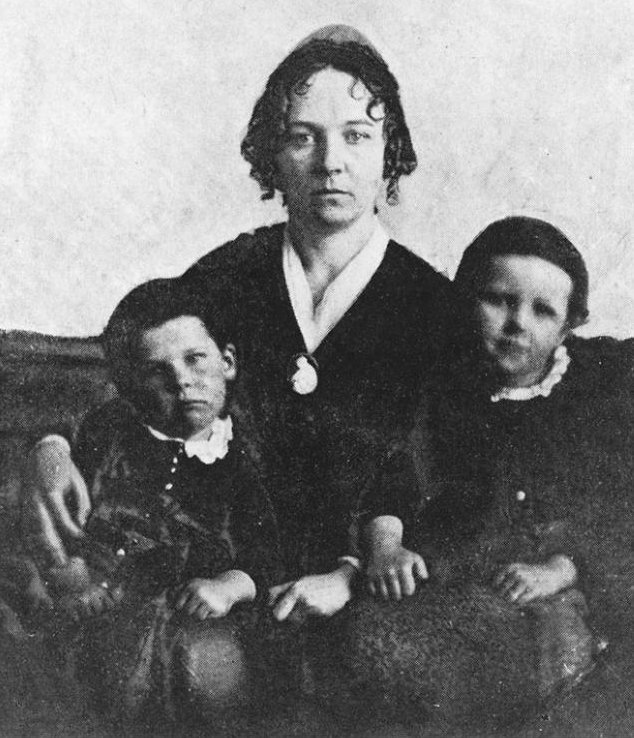
Elizabeth Cady Stanton in 1848 with two of her three sons

After Quaker worship on Sunday July 9, 1848, Lucretia Coffin Mott joined Mary Ann M'Clintock, Martha Coffin Wright (Mott's witty sister, several months pregnant), Elizabeth Cady Stanton and Jane Hunt for tea at the Hunt home in Waterloo. The two eldest M'Clintock daughters, Elizabeth and Mary Ann Jr. may have accompanied their mother. Jane Hunt had given birth two weeks earlier, and was tending the baby at home. Over tea, Stanton, the only non-Quaker present, vented a lifetime's worth of pent-up frustration, her "long-accumulating discontent" about women's subservient place in society. The five women decided to hold a women's rights convention in the immediate future, while the Motts were still in the area, and drew up an announcement to run in the Seneca County Courier. The announcement began with these words: "WOMAN'S RIGHTS CONVENTION.—A Convention to discuss the social, civil, and religious condition and rights of woman". The notice specified that only women were invited to the first day's meetings on July 19, but both women and men could attend on the second day to hear Lucretia Mott speak, among others. On July 11, the announcement first appeared, giving readers just eight days' notice until the first day of convention. Other papers such as Douglass's North Star picked up the notice, printing it on July 14. The meeting place was to be the Wesleyan Methodist Chapel in Seneca Falls. Built by a congregation of abolitionists and financed in part by Richard Hunt, the chapel had been the scene of many reform lectures, and was considered the only large building in the area that would open its doors to a women's rights convention.

=== Declaration, grievances, resolutions ===
At their home in Waterloo on Sunday, July 16, the M'Clintocks hosted a smaller planning session for the convention. Mary Ann M'Clintock and her eldest daughters, Elizabeth and Mary Ann Jr., discussed with Stanton the makeup of the resolutions that would be presented to the convention for approval. Each woman made certain her concerns were appropriately represented among the ten resolutions that they composed. Taken together, the resolutions demanded that women should have equality in the family, education, jobs, religion, and morals. One of the M'Clintock women selected the Declaration of Independence from 1776 as a model for the declaration they wanted to make at their convention. The Declaration of Sentiments was then drafted in the parlor on a round, three-legged, mahogany tea table. Stanton changed a few words of the Declaration of Independence to make it appropriate for a statement by women, replacing "The history of the present King of Great Britain" with "The history of mankind" as the basis for "usurpations on the part of man toward woman." The women added the phrase "and women" to make "... all men and women are created equal ..." A list of grievances was composed to form the second part of the Declaration.

Between July 16 and July 19, at home on her own writing desk, Stanton edited the grievances and resolutions. Henry Brewster Stanton, a lawyer, politician and Stanton's husband, helped substantiate the document by locating "extracts from laws bearing unjustly against woman's property interests." On her own, Stanton added a more radical point to the list of grievances and to the resolutions: the issue of women's voting rights. To the grievances, she added "He has never permitted her to exercise her inalienable right to the elective franchise", and to the Sentiments, she added a line about man depriving woman of "the elective franchise, thereby leaving her without representation in the halls of legislation ..." Stanton then copied the Declaration and resolutions into final draft form for presentation at the meeting. When he saw the addition of woman suffrage, Henry Stanton warned his wife "you will turn the proceedings into a farce." He, like most men of his day, was not in favor of women gaining voting rights. Because he intended to run for elective office, he left Seneca Falls to avoid being connected with a convention promoting such an unpopular cause. Elizabeth Cady Stanton asked her sister Harriet Cady Eaton to accompany her; Eaton brought her young son Daniel.

On July 16, Lucretia Mott sent a note to Stanton apologizing in advance for James Mott not being able to attend the first day, as he was feeling "quite unwell". Lucretia Mott wrote to say she would bring her sister, Martha Wright, and that the two women would participate in both days of the convention.

== First day ==
On July 19, 1848, the morning of the first day of convention, the organizing committee arrived at the Wesleyan Methodist Chapel shortly before ten o'clock on a hot, sunny day to find a crowd gathered outside and the church doors locked—an overlooked detail. Stanton's young nephew Daniel was lifted through an open window so that he could unbar the doors from the inside. Even though the first session had been announced as being exclusively for women, some young children of both sexes had been brought by their mothers, and about 40 men were there expecting to attend. The men were not turned away, but were asked to remain silent. Mary Ann M'Clintock Jr., 26 years old, was appointed secretary, to take notes.

=== Morning session ===
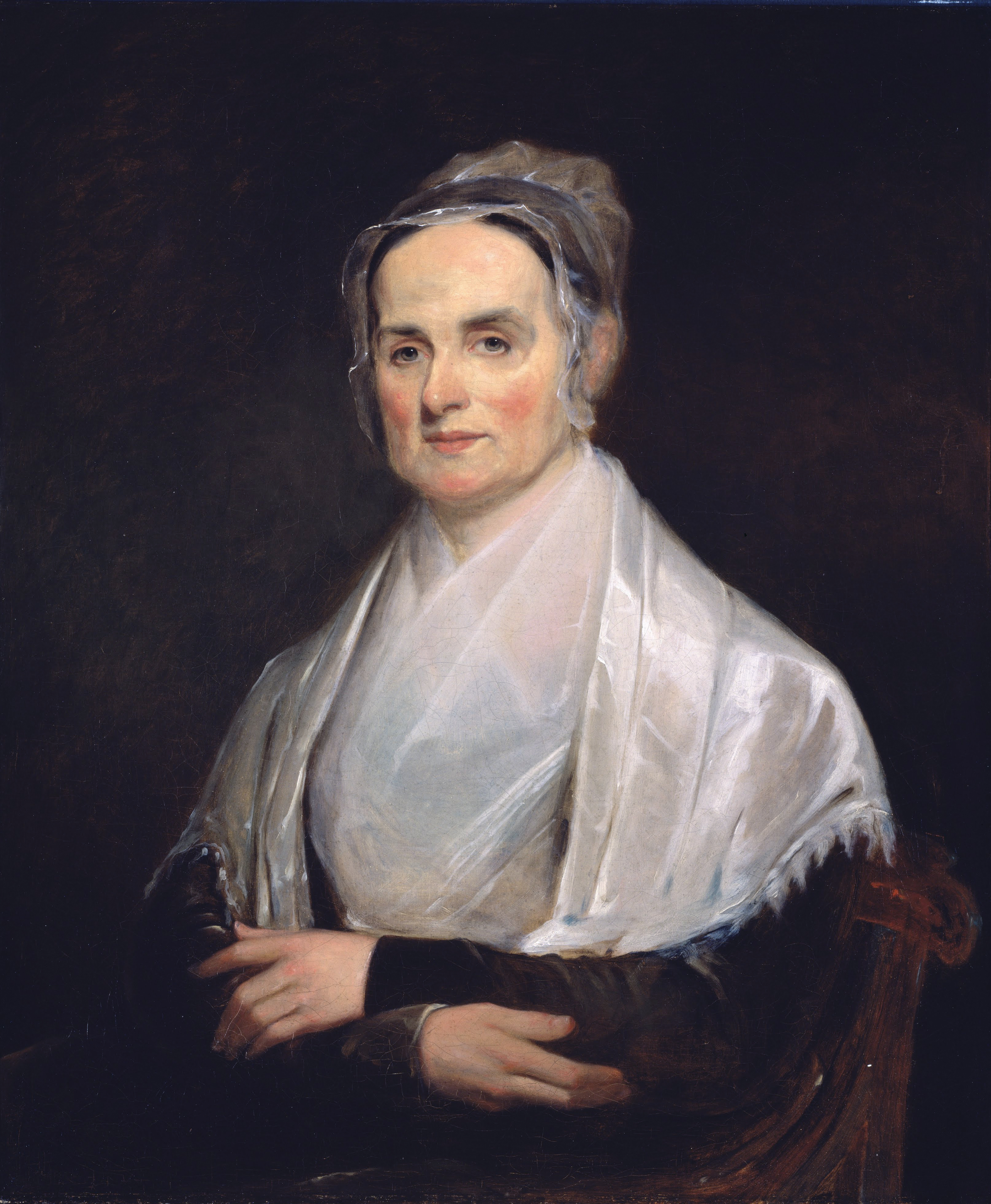
Lucretia Mott was described as "the moving spirit of the occasion".

Starting at 11 o'clock, Elizabeth Cady Stanton spoke first, exhorting each woman in the audience to accept responsibility for her own life, and to "understand the height, the depth, the length, and the breadth of her own degradation." Lucretia Mott then spoke, encouraging all to take up the cause. Stanton read the Declaration of Sentiments in its entirety, then re-read each paragraph so that it could be discussed at length, and changes incorporated. The question of whether men's signatures would be sought for the Declaration was discussed, with the vote looking favorable for including men, but the motion was tabled until the following day when men themselves could participate. The first session adjourned at 2:30 p.m.

=== Afternoon session ===
After a pause for refreshment in the 90° heat, an afternoon session began with Stanton and then Mott addressing the audience. The Declaration of Sentiments was read again and more changes were made to it. The resolutions, now numbering eleven with Stanton's addition of women's suffrage, were read aloud and discussed. Lucretia Mott read a humorous newspaper piece written by her sister Martha Wright in which Wright questioned why, after an overworked mother completed the myriad daily tasks that were required of her but not of her husband, she was the one upon whom written advice was "so lavishly bestowed." Twenty-seven-year-old Elizabeth W. M'Clintock then delivered a speech, and the first day's business was called to a close.

=== Evening speech ===
In the evening, the meeting was opened to all persons, and Lucretia Mott addressed a large audience. She spoke of the progress of other reform movements and so framed for her listeners the social and moral context for the struggle for women's rights. She asked the men present to help women gain the equality they deserved. The editor of the National Reformer, a paper in Auburn, New York, reported that Mott's extemporaneous evening speech was "one of the most eloquent, logical, and philosophical discourses which we ever listened to."

== Second day ==
A larger crowd attended on the second day, including more men. Amelia Bloomer arrived late and took a seat in the upstairs gallery, there being none left in the main seating area. Quaker James Mott was well enough to attend, and he chaired the morning meeting; it was still too radical a concept that a woman serve as chair in front of both men and women.

=== Morning session, day two ===
After Mott opened the meeting, the minutes of the previous day were read, and Stanton presented the Declaration of Sentiments. In regard to the grievance "He has taken from her all right in property, even to the wages she earns," Assemblyman Ansel Bascom stood to say that he had recently been at the New York State Assembly which passed the Married Woman's Property Act. Bascom spoke at length about the property rights it secured for married women, including property acquired after marriage. Further discussion of the Declaration ensued, including comments by Frederick Douglass, Thomas and Mary Ann M'Clintock, and Amy Post; the document was adopted unanimously. The question of men's signatures was solved by having two sections of signatures, one for women followed by one for men. One hundred of the 300 present signed the Declaration of Sentiments, including 68 women and 32 men. Amelia Bloomer was one of the participants who did not endorse the Declaration; she was focused at that time on the temperance movement. Ansel Bascom was the most conspicuous attendee who chose not to sign the Declaration. The National Reformer reported that those in the audience who evidently regarded the Declaration as "too bold and ultra", including the lawyers known to be opposed to the equal rights of women, "failed to call out any opposition, except in a neighboring BAR-ROOM."

=== Afternoon session, day two ===
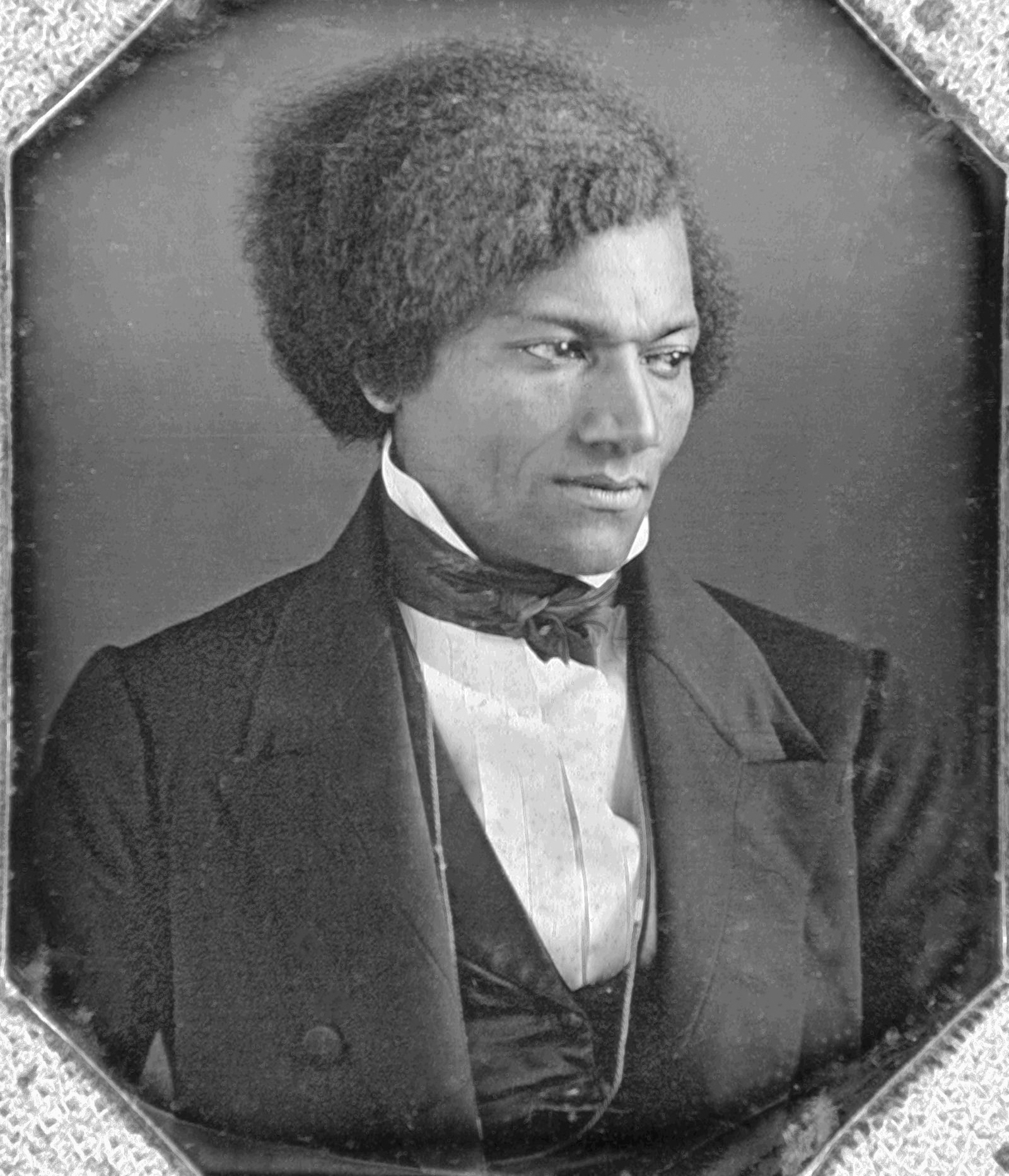
Frederick Douglass stood up to speak in favor of women's right to vote.

At the afternoon session, the eleven resolutions were read again, and each one was voted on individually. The only one that was materially questioned was the ninth, the one Stanton had added regarding women's right to vote. It read:

Resolved, that it is the duty of the women of this country to secure to themselves their sacred right to the elective franchise.

Those who opposed this resolution argued that its presence would cause the other, more rational resolutions to lose support. Others argued that only the social, civil and religious rights of women should be addressed, not the political rights. James and Lucretia Mott were against the resolution; Lucretia said to Stanton, "Why Lizzie, thee will make us ridiculous." Stanton defended the concept of woman suffrage, saying women would then be able to affect future legislation and gain further rights. Frederick Douglass, the only African American at the meeting, stood and spoke eloquently in favor; he said that he could not accept the right to vote himself as a black man if women could not also claim that right. Douglass projected that the world would be a better place if women were involved in the political sphere. "In this denial of the right to participate in government, not merely the degradation of woman and the perpetuation of a great injustice happens, but the maiming and repudiation of one-half of the moral and intellectual power of the government of the world." Douglass's powerful words rang true with many in attendance, and the resolution passed by a large majority. Lucretia Mott spoke to end the session.

=== Evening session, day two ===
Quaker Thomas M'Clintock served as chair for the evening session, opening it at half-past seven. The minutes were read, then Stanton spoke in defense of the many severe accusations brought against the much-abused "Lords of Creation." Following Stanton, Thomas M'Clintock read several passages from Sir William Blackstone's laws, to expose for the audience the basis of woman's current legal condition of servitude to man. Lucretia Mott stood to offer another resolution: "Resolved, That the speedy success of our cause depends upon the zealous and untiring efforts of both men and women, for the overthrow of the monopoly of the pulpit, and for the securing to woman an equal participation with men in the various trades, professions and commerce." This, the twelfth resolution, passed.

Mary Ann M'Clintock Jr. spoke briefly, calling upon woman to arouse from her lethargy and be true to herself and her God. Douglass again rose to speak in support of the cause of woman. Lucretia Mott spoke for an hour with one of her "most beautiful and spiritual appeals". Although Lucretia Mott's reputation as a speaker drew the audience, Mott recognized Elizabeth Cady Stanton and Mary Ann M'Clintock as the "chief planners and architects" of the convention. To close the meeting, a committee was appointed to edit and publish the convention proceedings, with Amy Post, Eunice Newton Foote, Mary Ann M'Clintock Jr., Elizabeth W. M'Clintock and Stanton serving.

== Afterward ==
=== News reports ===
Local newspapers printed reports of the convention, some positive, others not. The National Reformer reported that the convention "forms an era in the progress of the age; it being the first convention of the kind ever held, and one whose influence shall not cease until woman is guaranteed all the rights now enjoyed by the other half of creation—Social, Civil and POLITICAL." The Oneida Whig did not approve of the convention, writing of the Declaration: "This bolt is the most shocking and unnatural incident ever recorded in the history of womanity. If our ladies will insist on voting and legislating, where, gentleman, will be our dinners and our elbows? Where our domestic firesides and the holes in our stockings?"

Soon, newspapers across the country picked up the story. Reactions varied widely. In Massachusetts, the Lowell Courier published its opinion that, with women's equality, "the lords must wash the dishes, scour up, be put to the tub, handle the broom, darn stockings." In St. Louis, Missouri, the Daily Reveille trumpeted that "the flag of independence has been hoisted for the second time on this side of the Atlantic." Horace Greeley in the New York Tribune wrote "When a sincere republican is asked to say in sober earnest what adequate reason he can give, for refusing the demand of women to an equal participation with men in political rights, he must answer, None at all. However unwise and mistaken the demand, it is but the assertion of a natural right, and such must be conceded."

=== Religious reaction ===
Some of the ministers heading congregations in the area attended the Seneca Falls Convention, but none spoke out during the sessions, not even when comments from the floor were invited. On Sunday, July 23, many who had attended, and more who had not, attacked the Convention, the Declaration of Sentiments, and the resolutions. Women in the congregations reported to Stanton, who saw the actions of the ministers as cowardly; in their congregations, no one would be allowed to reply.

=== Further conventions ===
Signers of the Declaration of Sentiments hoped for "a series of Conventions, embracing every part of the country" to follow their own meeting. Because of the fame and drawing power of Lucretia Mott, who would not be staying in the Upstate New York area for much longer, some of the participants at Seneca Falls organized the Rochester Women's Rights Convention two weeks later in Rochester, New York, with Lucretia Mott as its featured speaker. Unlike the Seneca Falls convention, the Rochester convention took the controversial step of electing a woman, Abigail Bush, as its presiding officer. In the next two years, "the infancy ... of the movement", other local and state women's rights conventions were called in Ohio, Indiana, and Pennsylvania.

Charlotte Woodward, alone among all 100 signers, was the only one still alive in 1920 when the Nineteenth Amendment passed. Woodward was not well enough to vote herself.

=== Remembrances ===
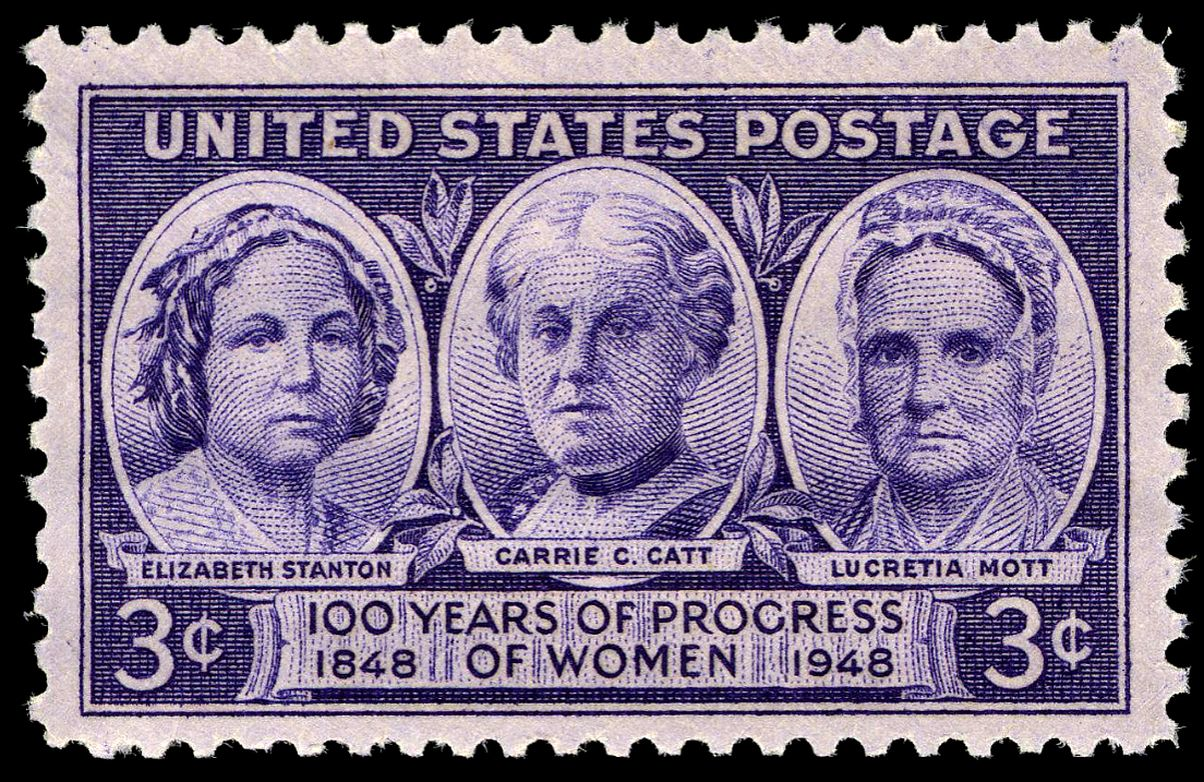
U.S. commemorative stamp of 1948, Seneca Falls Convention titled 100 Years of Progress of Women: 1848–1948. From left to right, Stanton, Carrie Chapman Catt, Lucretia Mott.

A stamp was issued in 1948 in remembrance of the Seneca Falls Convention, featuring Elizabeth Cady Stanton, Carrie Chapman Catt, and Lucretia Mott as part of a Centennial Celebration in Seneca Falls.

The Women's Rights National Historical Park was established in 1980, and covers a total of 6.83 acres (27,600 m^{2}) of land in Seneca Falls and nearby Waterloo, New York, USA. The park consists of four major historical properties, including the Wesleyan Methodist Church, which was the site of the Seneca Falls Convention, Elizabeth Cady Stanton's home, and the M'Clintock House, which was where the Declaration of Sentiments, resolutions, and speeches were drawn up for the Seneca Falls Convention. The Wesleyan Methodist Church and the M'Clintock House were listed on the National Register of Historic Places in 1980.

In 1998 First Lady Hillary Clinton gave a speech on the occasion of the 150th anniversary of the Seneca Falls Convention.

In 2015, #FindtheSentiments was launched by the White House under Barack Obama in an effort to find an original of the Declaration of Sentiments. The call to action was picked up by social media and several historical sites. To date, the Sentiments have not been found.

== Historiography ==
In 1870, Paulina Wright Davis authored a history of the antebellum women's rights movement, The History of the National Woman's Rights Movement, and received approval of her account from many of the involved suffragists including Lucretia Mott and Elizabeth Cady Stanton. Davis' version gave the Seneca Falls meeting in 1848 a minor role, equivalent to other local meetings that had been held by women's groups in the late 1840s. Davis set the beginning of the national and international women's rights movement at Worcester, Massachusetts, in 1850, at the National Women's Rights Convention when women from many states were invited, the influence of which was felt across the continent and in Great Britain. Stanton seemed to agree; in an address to the National Woman Suffrage Association (NWSA) convention in 1870, on the subject of the women's rights movement, she said "The movement in England, as in America, may be dated from the first National Convention, held at Worcester, Mass., October, 1850."

In 1876, in the spirit of the nation's centennial celebrations, Stanton and Susan B. Anthony decided to write a more expansive history of the women's rights movement. They invited Lucy Stone to help, but Stone declined to be part of the project; she was of the opinion that Stanton and Anthony would not fairly portray the divisive split between NWSA and American Woman Suffrage Association (AWSA). Stanton and Anthony wrote without her and, in 1881, they published the first volume of the History of Woman Suffrage, and placed themselves at each of its most important events, marginalizing Stone's contribution.

According to Lisa Tetrault, a professor of women's history, the Seneca Falls Convention was central to their rendition of the movement's history. Neither Stanton nor Anthony had been at the 1850 convention, which was associated with their rivals. Stanton, however, had played a key role at the Seneca Falls Convention in 1848, at which Stone had not been present. In the early 1870s, Stanton and Anthony began to present Seneca Falls as the beginning of the women's rights movement, an origin story that downplayed Stone's role. Pointing out that the women's rights movement could be said to have begun even earlier than Seneca Falls, Tetrault said the History of Woman Suffrage dealt with these earlier events relatively briefly in its first three chapters, the first of which is titled "Preceding Causes." In the volume, Stanton did not mention the Liberty Party's plank on woman suffrage pre-dating the Seneca Falls Convention by a month, and she did not describe the Worcester National Women's Rights Convention, organized by Stone and Davis in 1850, as the beginning of the women's rights movement. Rather, Stanton named the 1840 Anti-Slavery Convention in London as the birth of the "movement for woman's suffrage, in both England and America". She positioned the Seneca Falls meeting as her own political debut, and characterized it as the beginning of the women's rights movement, which she called "the greatest movement for human liberty recorded on the pages of history—a demand for freedom to one-half the entire race."

Stanton worked to enshrine the Declaration of Sentiments as a foundational treatise in a number of ways, not the least of which was by imbuing the small, three-legged tea table upon which the first draft of it was composed with an importance similar to that of Thomas Jefferson's desk upon which he wrote the Declaration of Independence. The M'Clintocks gave Stanton the table, then Stanton gave it to Susan B. Anthony on the occasion of her 80th birthday, though Anthony had no part in the Seneca Falls meeting. In keeping with Stanton's promotion of the table as an iconic relic, women's rights activists put it in a place of honor at the head of the casket at the funeral of Susan B. Anthony on March 14, 1906. Subsequently, it was displayed prominently on the stage at each of the most important suffrage meetings until 1920, even though the grievance and resolution about woman suffrage was not written on it. The table is kept at the Smithsonian Institution's National Museum of American History in Washington, D.C.

Lucretia Mott reflected in August 1848 upon the two women's rights conventions in which she had participated that summer, and assessed them no greater than other projects and missions she was involved with. She wrote that the two gatherings were "greatly encouraging; and give hope that this long neglected subject will soon begin to receive the attention that its importance demands."

Historian Gerda Lerner has pointed out that religious ideas provided a fundamental source for the Declaration of Sentiments. Most of the women attending the convention were active in Quaker or evangelical Methodist movements. The document itself drew from writings by the evangelical Quaker Sarah Grimké to make biblical claims that God had created woman equal to man and that man had usurped God's authority by establishing "absolute tyranny" over woman. According to author Jami Carlacio, Grimké's writings opened the public's eyes to ideas like women's rights, and for the first time they were willing to question conventional notions about the subordination of women.

== See also ==
- Conference of Badasht, Persian women's rights, June–July 1848
- First-wave feminism
- Convention on the Elimination of All Forms of Discrimination Against Women (CEDAW), (1979)
- List of suffragists and suffragettes
- List of women's rights activists
- National Women's Conference
- Timeline of women's suffrage
- Women's suffrage organizations
- Women's Rights National Historical Park, which contains the site of the Seneca Falls Convention
- Timeline of feminism in the United States
- Timeline of feminism
