= Harry Watrous =

American artist

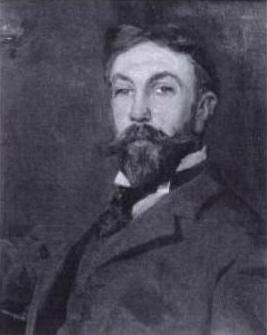
- Harry Watrous c. 1895 by Eduardo Gordigiani; Collection of the National Academy of Design
- Born: Harry Willson Watrous; 17 September 1857; San Francisco
- Died: 10 May 1940 (aged 82); New York City
- Education: Académie Julian, atelier of Léon Bonnat
- Works: William Gilman Nichols, before 1910; The Passing of Summer, 1912; The Drop Sinister, c. 1913; The Celebration of the Mass, c. 1930-35

Harry Willson Watrous (17 September 1857 – 10 May 1940) was an American visual artist who received an academic education in France. His paintings included genre scenes, stylized figural works, landscapes, nocturnes, portraits, religious subjects, and still lifes. His 1913 painting The Drop Sinister, What Shall We Do with It? has been called the first known portrait of an American interracial family. He is perhaps best known for his enigmatic paintings of sophisticated women, often darkly dressed and seen in profile.

== Education and career ==
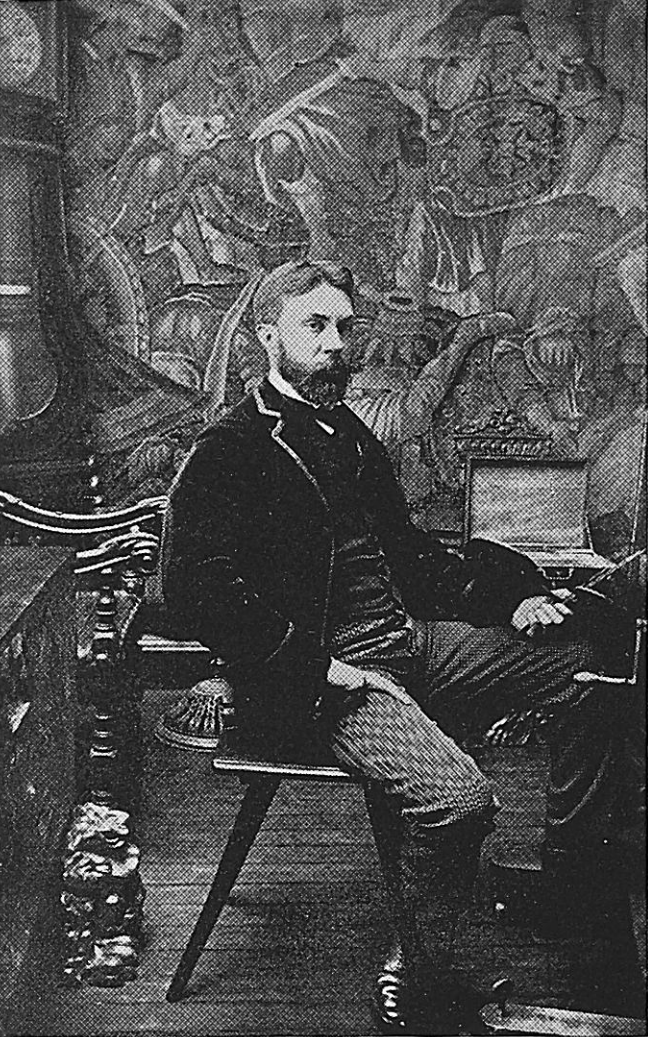
Watrous in his studio in New York, c. 1895.

Harry Watrous was born in San Francisco in 1857, the son of Charles and Ruth Willson Watrous. He had two brothers, Charles (1854–56) and Walter (1860–1903). Harry's father had been a whaler in his youth and made his fortune during the California Gold Rush. The family moved to New York City in 1864, where his father's wealth allowed the young Watrous to be educated in private schools and to pursue an artistic career at his own pace, without having to worry about making a living.

He traveled to Spain with the deaf American artist Henry Humphrey Moore in 1881, and then to Paris, where he studied under Gustave Boulanger and Jules Lefebvre at the Académie Julian, and in Léon Bonnat's atelier. He had paintings accepted at the Paris Salons of 1884 and 1885. He was strongly influenced first by Marià Fortuny and then by Jean Louis Meissonier, who predicted that "someday this young man will be the American Meissonier." Watrous would later contribute a chapter about Meissonier to the book Modern French Masters. He returned to the United States in 1886.

Beginning in 1883, Watrous painted small genre pictures, "amazing in their almost microscopic detail." These works "of cabinet size…descended directly from such seventeenth-century masters as Metsu, Terborch, and Vermeer," and later, Vibert and Meissonier.

It is not a simple matter to reproduce with oil paint the sheen of satins and silks, the softness of furs and the richness of velvets, especially when it comes to doing it on a small canvas with the minute precision required in a picture that is intended to be seen at close range.…The strain upon an artist's eyes in doing such miniature-like work is very great and in the case of Mr. Watrous effectually prevented his continuing it, having seriously affected his sight.

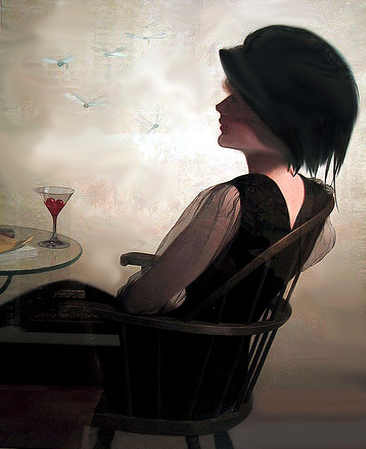
The Passing of Summer, 1912, Metropolitan Museum.

This impairment of his vision began in 1905 and was temporary, but did prompt Watrous to stop painting tiny, minutely detailed genre scenes, and to work on a larger scale and in a broader manner, producing from 1905 to 1918 the idealized female figures for which he is best known. "Perhaps the most original of all his works, these paintings are very enigmatic, suggesting a symbolic intent or at least a psychological strangeness." The paintings often convey a sense of whimsy or quiet melancholy.

When the Metropolitan Museum acquired this painting [The Passing of Summer] just after it was completed, the artist explained that in the autumn of 1911 he had observed a woman seated alone at a table in a French restaurant. Watrous asked her, "Well, has Prince Charming appeared?" Her melancholy answer was "No, and this is the passing of summer." This work thus alludes to the fleeting nature of youth and beauty and the loss of opportunity.

A profile of Watrous from 1923 noted that in these paintings

he displayed a note of humor or of tragedy wholly unknown to his earlier canvases and panels. His humor finds expression in demure revelations of feminine moods and modes, while his recognition of tragic consequences resulting from conscious or unconscious causes is revealed in the two best known of his "problem pictures," called The Dregs and The Drop Sinister…There is a commonly held viewpoint that these particular paintings are of trifling consequence, but those who hold it completely overlook their importance as social records and their rare technique."

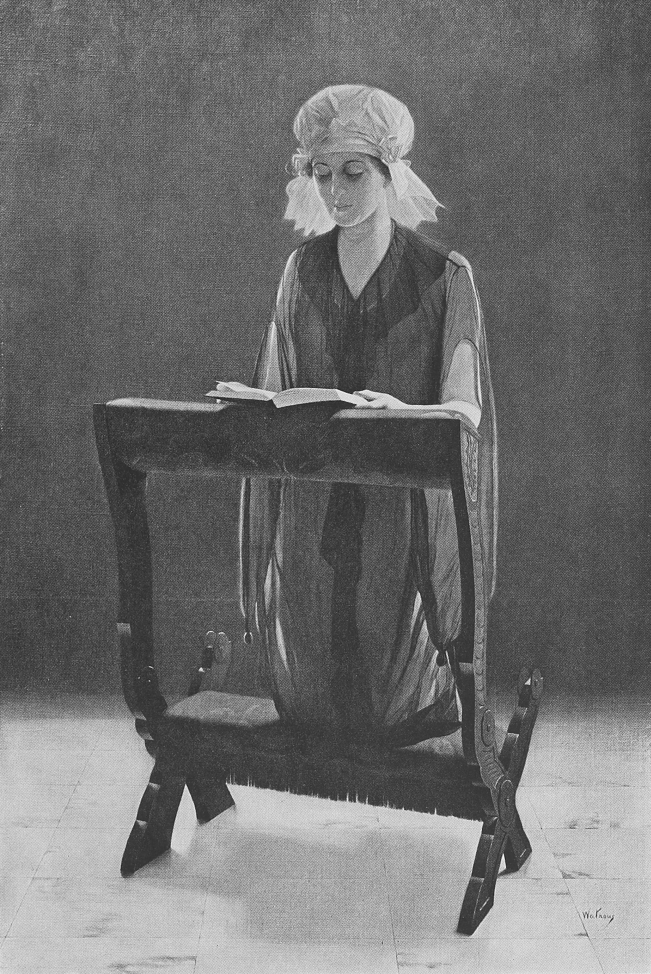
Lead Us Not Into Temptation, 1916, location unknown.

Throughout this period, Watrous also painted images of a woman kneeling at prayer. On the first of these, in 1908, American Art News commented, "Harry Watrous' Fair Penitent [aka Devotion] is…well thought out and well painted. There is a decided contrast in this canvas to the risqué Cup of Tea, Cigarette, and She, which Mr. Watrous showed last spring." The Sun denounced a later example: "The succès de scandale of the Academy [exhibit of 1916]…is called Lead Us Not Into Temptation, a prayer that Mr. Watrous himself should utter each time he feels inclined to paint. It shows a profane young woman in shockingly frivolous gauzes and flamboyant morning cap, kneeling upon a garish prie-dieu for prayers, but judging by the simper upon her foolish face her 'words fly up' while her 'thoughts remain below.' In every way the picture is an offense against good taste." The Art World found the same painting "a work of delicate wit and genial satire…intellectually stimulating art."

In 1918, The Moon Path, his "first landscape," marked a "new departure for Harry Watrous, a moonlit landscape in the manner of [Ralph] Blakelock," and until 1923 he painted mainly landscapes and nocturnes. "In their evocative mood, boldly designed compositions, and use of light and dark contrasts, these paintings resemble the work of his friend Blakelock, although Watrous retained the sharp outlines and smooth paint surfaces characteristic of his own early work." Long bedeviled by mental illness, Blakelock died in 1919. Watrous's nocturnes and landscapes in the style of Blakelock may be seen as elegiac and posthumous tributes.

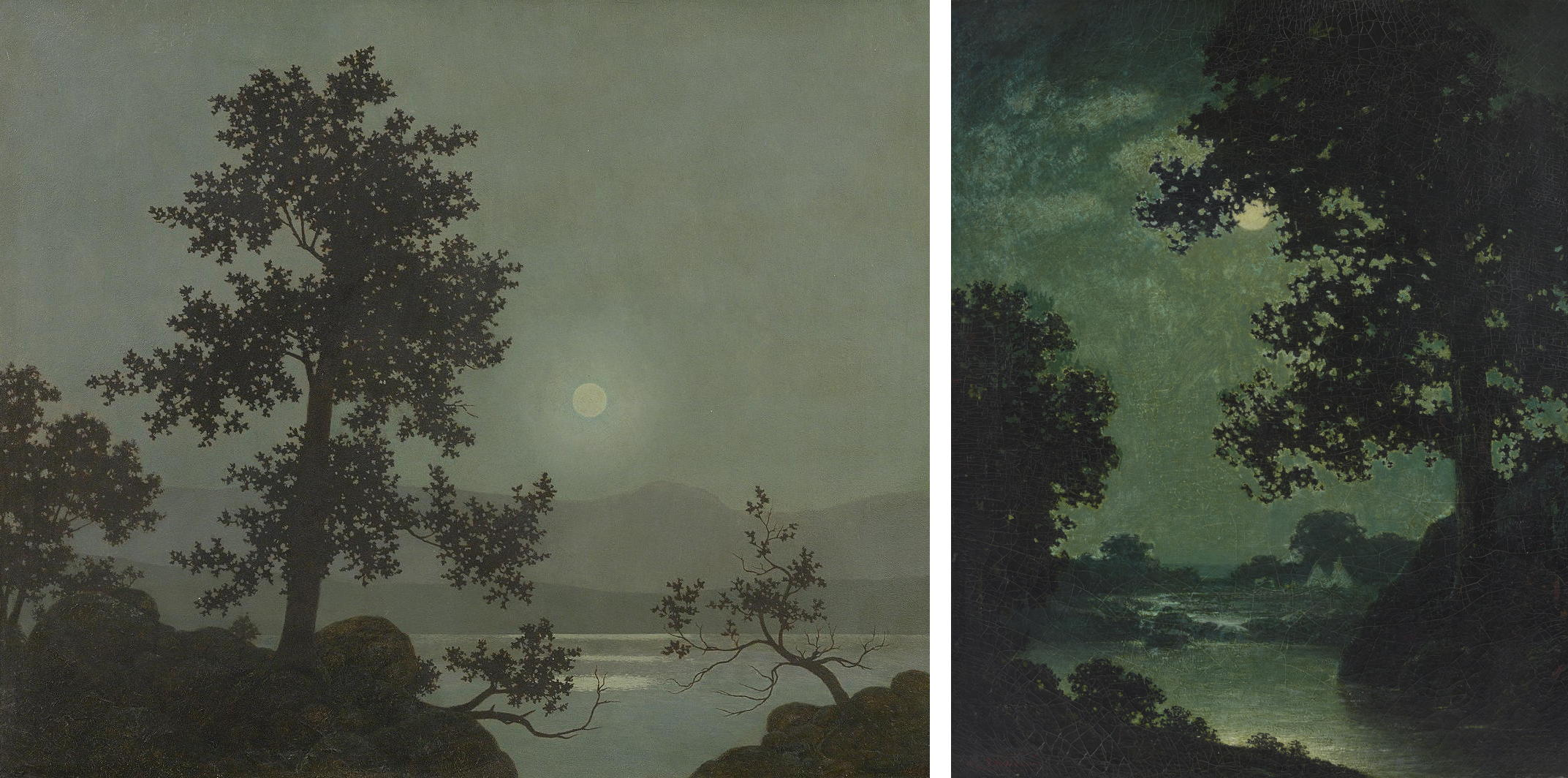
Twilight (c. 1918–1923, private collection) one of Watrous's nocturnes that pays homage to Ralph Blakelock. Right: Blakelock's Moonlight (c. 1888, Yale University Art Gallery).

"Around 1923 he began to paint still lifes, usually arrangements of the antique decorative objects he eagerly collected," including a number of Buddhist images. Several objects, tapestries, and pieces of furniture appear in more than one painting, as Watrous recombined them for different effects over the years.

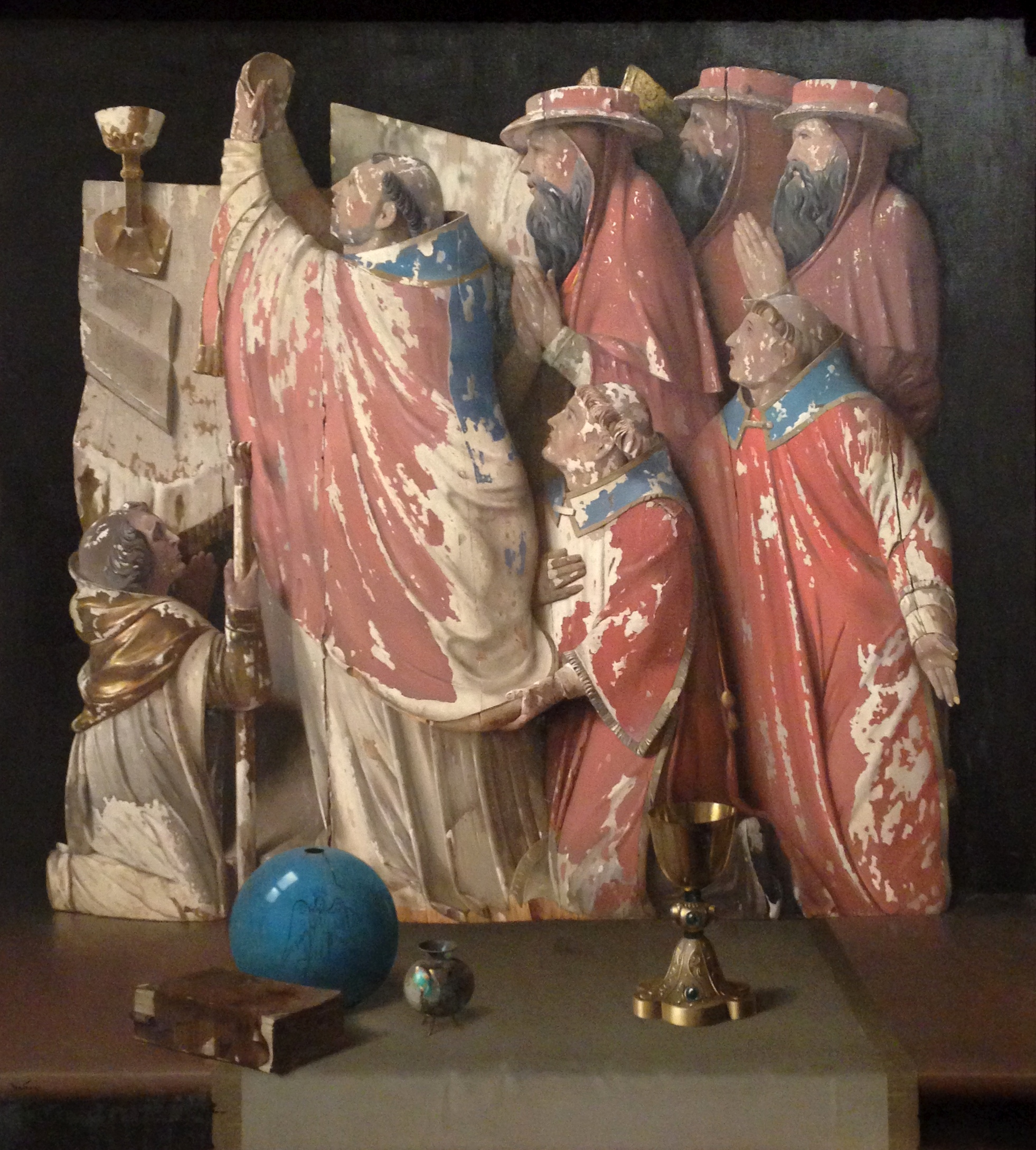
The Celebration of the Mass, begun in 1930 and finished in 1935, Metropolitan Museum of Art.

In the 1930s, employing devices that recall "works by earlier American trompe-l'œil ("deceive the eye") painters," he created images of weathered religious icons. The Celebration of the Mass (1930-1935), now in the collection of the Metropolitan Museum of Art, was included in the 1943 exhibit "American Realists and Magic Realists" at MOMA. He also painted a number of Madonna and Child polychromatic statues. "Exploring a new vein, he exercised a new power and in spite of advancing years made these religious pictures the best of his career."

It was not until he was 80, in 1937, that Watrous had a one-man show, at the Grand Central Art Galleries in New York. A reviewer in The New York Times wrote: "Irradiating all that he does is the strong and progressive spirit of the painter himself; a painter who has held fast to the principles in which he believes, yet who has never seemed to fall into inelastic, ossified rote; never, really, to have grown old." Another piece on the exhibit in The New York Times declared, "No American artist is more deeply respected or widely loved than he.…One need not hesitate for a moment to decide that Harry Watrous is doing the best work of his career right now."

Watrous was known to have painted only three portraits—one of his brother-in-law, William Gilman Nichols (now in a private collection); Portrait of Mrs. Harry W. Watrous, given by Watrous to the Sweat Museum (now the Portland Museum of Art) along with The Drop Sinister in 1919; Portrait of My Mother ("a beautiful piece of work technically and having so gracious and tender a spirit that it becomes the one portrait in a thousand that really records the individual"), given by Watrous to the Corcoran Gallery in 1926.

== The Drop Sinister ==
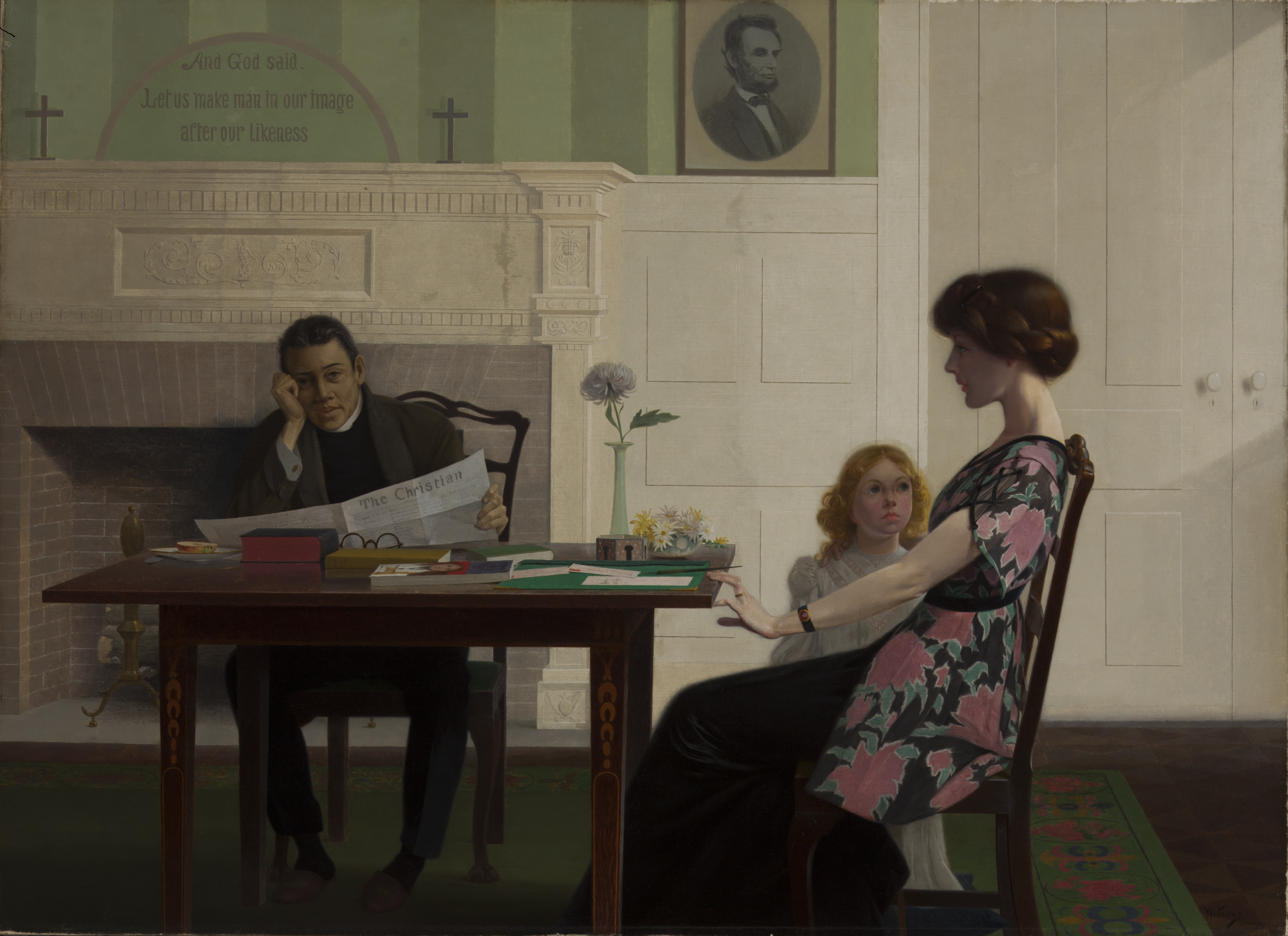
The Drop Sinister, What Shall We Do with It?, c. 1913, Portland Museum of Art (gift of the artist, 1919).

Around 1913, Watrous painted The Drop Sinister, What Shall We Do with It?, which was visually similar to his other works at the time, but, by addressing an issue of social and moral concern, was unique among his paintings. It is said to be the first known portrait of an American interracial family. The father wears a clerical collar and holds a Christian newspaper in his hand; on the wall is a portrait of Abraham Lincoln and a quotation, "And God said, Let us make man in our own image after our likeness."

The painting caused a stir when it was exhibited at the National Academy of Design and at the Century Club in New York. "Harry W. Watrous preaches and paints well an interesting sermon on the negro question in The Drop Sinister," commented American Art News, which also called it "one of his best canvases." This "study in the fruits of miscegenation…caused an extraordinary amount of discussion, residents of one typically Southern city threatening to wreck the art museum if it was shown there."

The painting appears to depict a mixed marriage, which was illegal in many states at the time. The Crisis, the N.A.A.C.P. journal edited by W.E.B. DuBois, had a different idea about what was going on in the picture:

The people in this picture are all "colored"; that is to say the ancestors of all of them two or three generations ago numbered among them full-blooded Negroes. These "colored" folk married and brought to the world a little golden-haired child; today they pause for a moment and sit aghast when they think of this child's future.

What is she? A Negro? No, she is "white." But is she white? The United States Census says she is a "Negro." What earthly difference does it make what she is, so long as she grows up a good, true, capable woman? But her chances for doing this are small! Why?

Because 90,000,000 of her neighbors, good Christian, noble, civilized people are going to insult her, seek to ruin her and slam the door of opportunity in her face the moment they discover "The Drop Sinister."

== Academic offices and awards; controversies ==
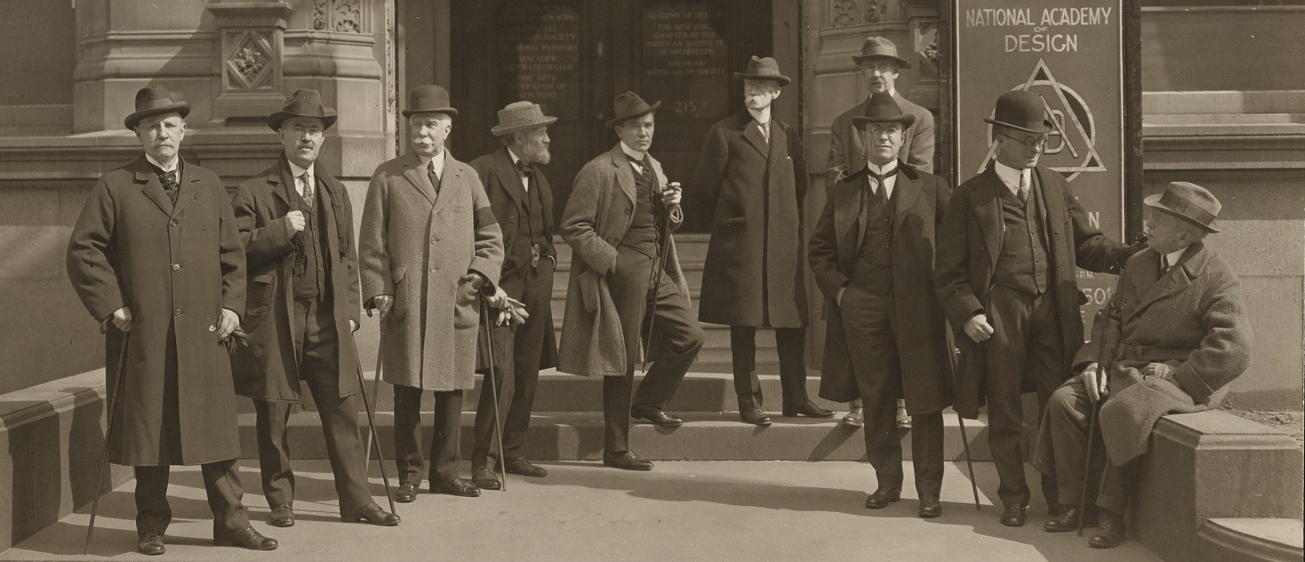
Council of the National Academy of Design, New York, April, 1922; Watrous is third from left, wearing an armband to mark that he is in mourning for his wife, Elizabeth, who died Oct. 4, 1921. Robert Ingersoll Aitken, designer or the Elizabeth Watrous Medal for Sculpture, is at center, hand in pocket. To identify others in the photo, see this image.

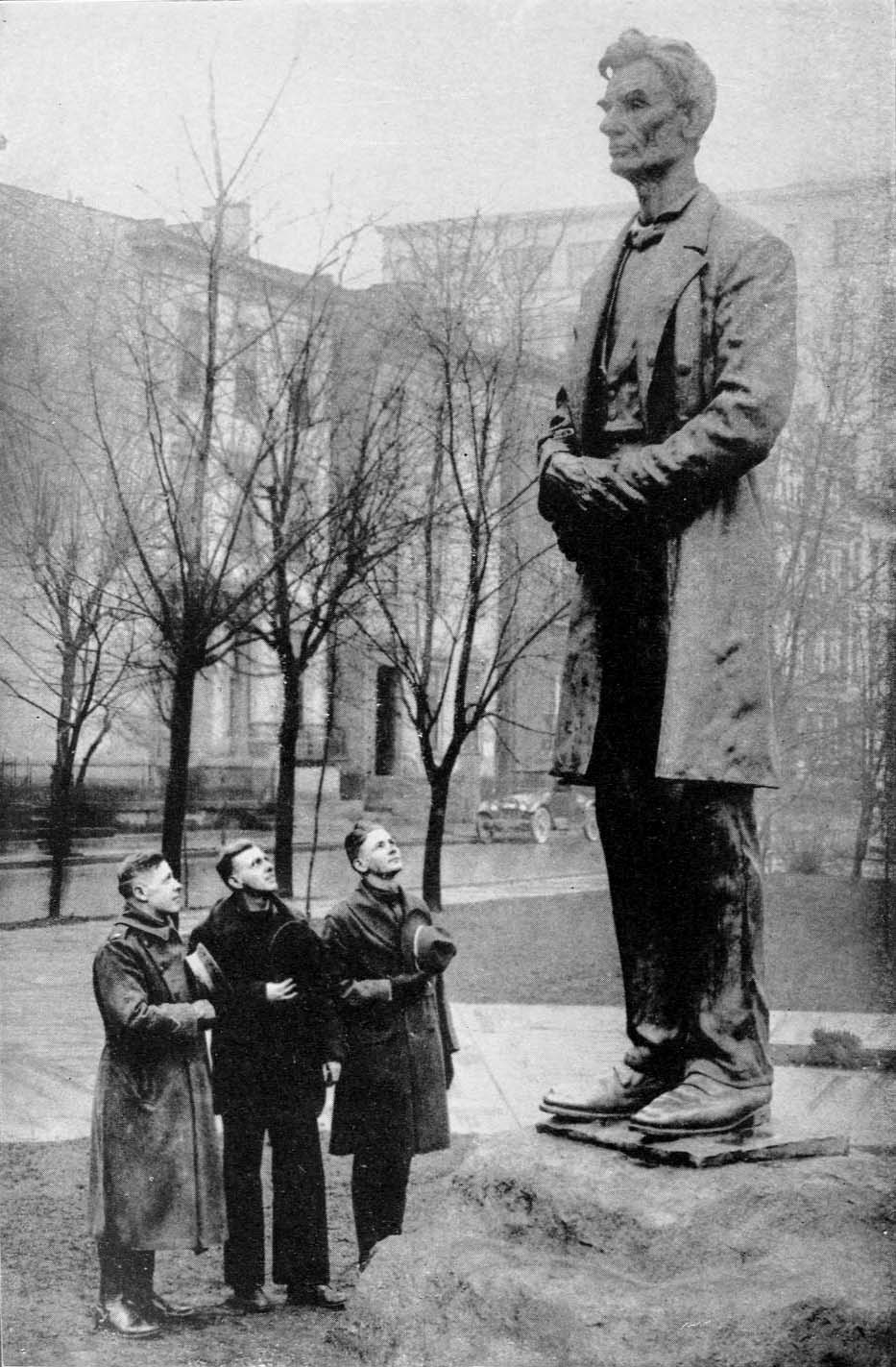
George Gray Barnard's statue of Abraham Lincoln in Cincinnati.

In 1894 Watrous won the Thomas B. Clarke prize for figure painting for his work Bills and was elected an associate of the National Academy of Design, becoming a full academician in 1895. He was active in the organization for the rest of his life. He served as secretary from 1898 to 1920, as vice president in 1922 and 1932–33, and as president 1933–34. Watrous received the academy's Carnegie Prize for Madonna and Child (aka Still Life) in 1931, and the academy's Saltus Gold Medal in 1934 for Rose Madonna. Celebration of the Mass was shown at the Pennsylvania Academy of the Fine Arts in 1935, where it was awarded the Walter Lippincott Prize.

In his role as a member and officer of the National Academy of Design, Watrous often championed old-fashioned artistic values. A striking example is his letter from 1917 conveying a resolution by the academy showing disapproval of the new Lincoln sculpture by George Gray Barnard:

Whereas, the impression prevails that the replicas offered to France and England of a statue of Lincoln by George Gray Barnard in Cincinnati are being offered as gifts from the people of America, presumably with the approval of the artists and art organizations of this country, therefore, Resolved, That the Council of the National Academy of Design hereby asserts that there has been no approval of this statue on the part of the National Academy as a body, and, further, that the members of this Council as here assembled do not consider that the statue adequately portrays Lincoln. In a work of this kind, all must agree that character and likeness are essentials. But to us this presentation does not convey the recognized characteristics of Lincoln. In it we are unable to discern evidence of his genius or humor, or any of those lofty qualities which are invariably associated with this great name.

Speaking to the Allied Artists of America in 1933, Watrous declared that Modernism had "threatened complete chaos, but is now rapidly receding, and it rests with you who have stood fast against it to carry on and prove to the world that we have great art in America." Later that year, as president of the academy, Watrous told The New York Times, "There is much good in modern art. I see in it simplicity, nice lines and a certain compactness. But there is also much trash.…The academy has held like an anchor in the storm and we are not going to be driven into accepting any movement merely because it is fashionable." Later in 1933, the disbursement of Civil Works Administration funds to artists made front-page news when Watrous and others protested that the decision-making committee was unfairly tilted toward Modernists. "Placing the administration of an important appropriation into the hands of one specific art group," said Watrous, "lends an atmosphere of exploitation of so-called 'modern' art to the project."

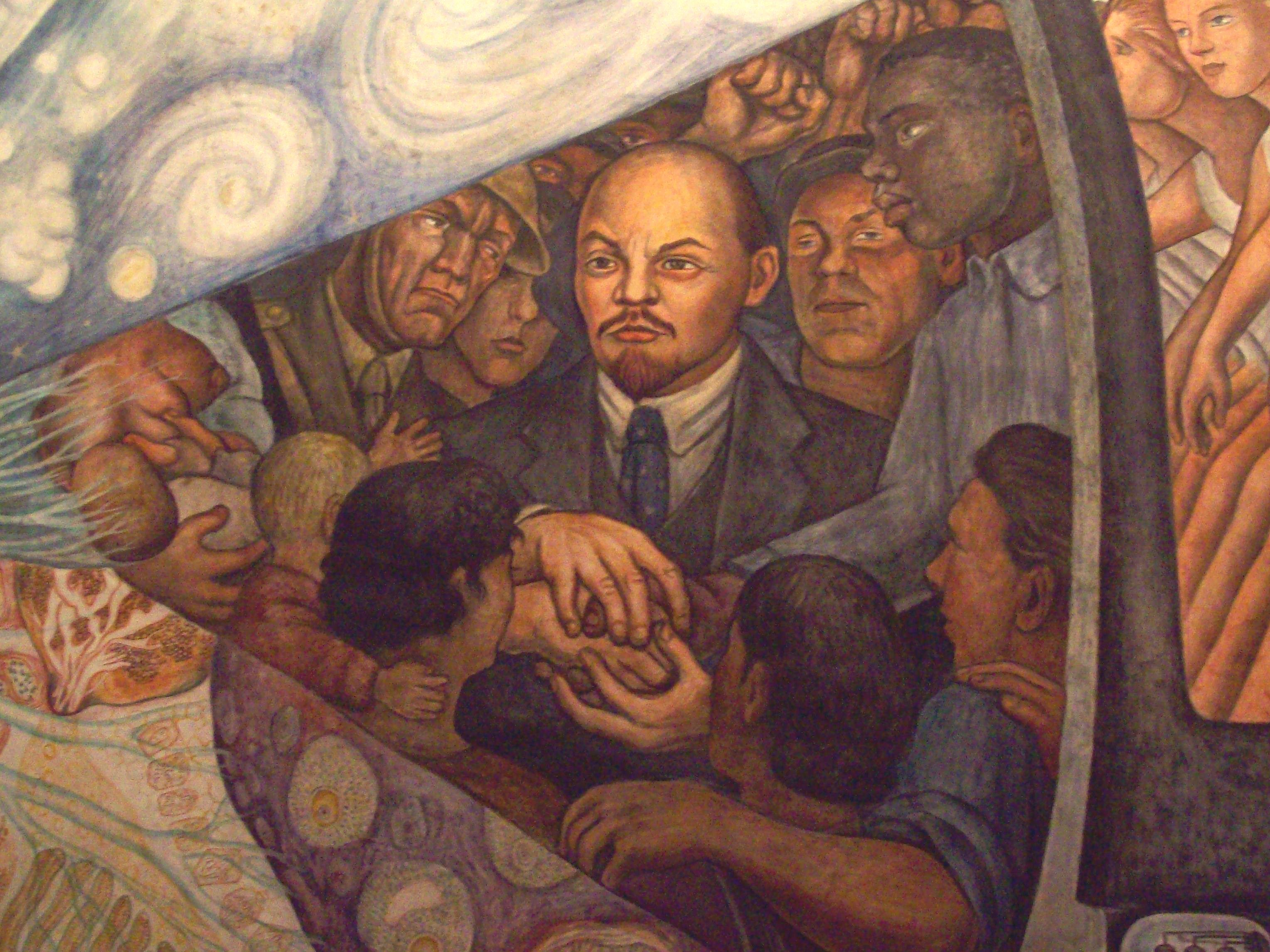
The controversial portrait of Lenin, as seen in Rivera's recreation of the destroyed Man at the Crossroads.

In 1934, Diego Rivera was commissioned to paint a mural, Man at the Crossroads, for the RCA Building at Rockefeller Center. Rivera's depiction of "Lenin as the great modern leader of humanity…proved too much for the art-loving Rockefellers. Rivera was paid in full and dismissed, and the uncompleted mural was covered with burlap," and ultimately destroyed.

This news filled artists and art lovers with anger and resentment. The old question was raised; "Has the owner of a work of art a right to destroy it?" The almost instinctive response seems to be "No." Yet there was, strange to relate, a decided clash of opinion even among the artists, to say nothing of the press. "It was premeditated Art Murder," said John Sloan, one of our most important and respected painters. "Poppycock," exclaimed Harry Watrous, the venerable president of the National Academy of Design. "Mr. [Nelson] Rockefeller, feeling insulted by the political propaganda in the Rivera mural, destroyed it, as he had a perfect right to do."

== The H.W. Watrous Collection of Palettes ==
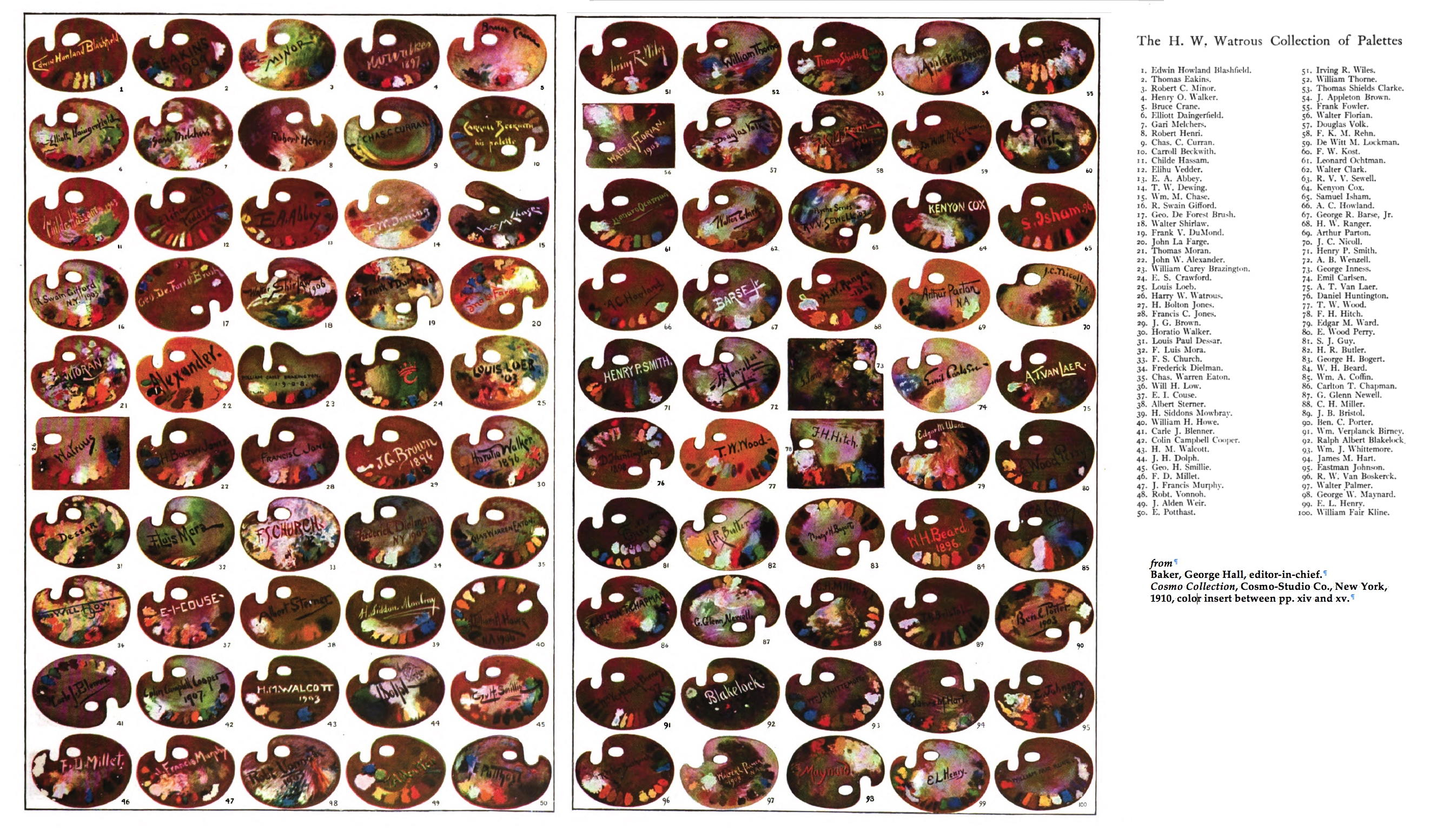
The H.W. Watrous Collection of Palettes, each signed by the artist.

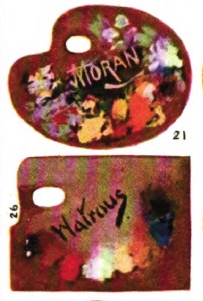
Signed palettes of Thomas Moran and Harry Watrous.

Beginning in the 1890s, Watrous collected the palettes of other painters, each signed by the artist. His collection came to include palettes from Ralph Blakelock, William Merritt Chase, Frederic Edwin Church, Thomas Eakins, Childe Hassam, Robert Henri, George Inness, Francis Davis Millet (who died on the Titanic), Thomas Moran, Elihu Vedder, and Watrous himself.

The H.W. Watrous Collection of 100 palettes was reproduced in color over two pages in the book Cosmo Collection, published in 1908 and reprinted in 1910. Both editions included a facsimile letter in which (surprisingly for such a conservative realist painter) Watrous's appreciation of the palettes as works of art and expressions of the artist's psyche foreshadows theories of abstract expressionism:

It was never my intention to take the public into my confidence and allow it a glimpse of this collection during my life, after which it would probably go to the National Academy of Design. I gathered these palettes as a pleasant remembrance of the many years I lived among and worked with the signers, each having some association connected with it. But…I have seriously considered your request and concluded to accede to it and to permit the reproduction for exhibition as works of art, as one might a collection of beautiful pictures, and also to dispel the illusion that there is something mysterious and secret in an artist's choice of materials, and that our palettes should be as carefully guarded as the component parts of a patent medicine, or the plans of a war balloon.

In examining this collection, you will notice the individuality in the setting of the colors, some with the white in the center, some with it on the end, with the reds, yellows, greens, and blues grouped in entirely different manners (like the changes in a kaleidoscope), but always beautiful and harmonious. It also shows the simplicity of the artist's choice of colors, and how an hundred or more painters will take the same palette and work an entirely different color scheme, the dry and hard, the rich and mellow, the sparkling and somber, each proclaiming the master in brain and brush. Some of these palettes have been "Studio Gods" and have been used for years, some for the painting of a single picture, and some have never been used, but have been "set" for me, and on each is the signature used by the painter in signing a picture. For they are pictures, and in living with them I see the painters and what they love to paint, though many of the hands that held these palettes will never again clasp mine on earth.

In 1911 this "remarkable collection" was displayed at the Union League Club in New York, where "the wall which they covered was a riot of color." A posthumous exhibit of works by Ralph Blakelock at the Dudensing Gallery in New York in 1922 included Blakelock's palette, loaned by Watrous.

Approximately 60 of the palettes in the Watrous collection are now in the collection of the Salmagundi Club library in New York City.

== Personal life ==
=== Marriage and family ===
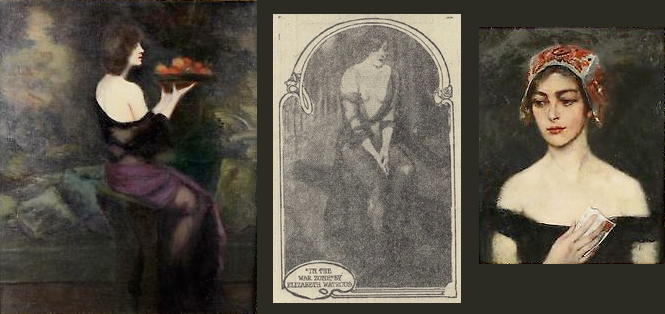
Three paintings by Elizabeth Watrous. In the center is In the War Zone from 1915, which was banned from an exhibition at the New Rochelle Public Library as not suitable to be seen by children. Elizabeth Watrous quipped, "You see, the woman didn't have time to dress for the street. The Uhlans were coming and she had time to dress only for the opera."

In 1887 Watrous married Elizabeth Snowden Nichols (1858–1921). Her father, William Snowden Nichols, was a member of the New York Stock Exchange, and she grew up in the posh neighborhood of Grymes Hill, Staten Island. She too was an artist, having studied in Paris under Jean-Jacques Henner and Carolus-Duran at "the studio of the ladies." (Women were not allowed entry to the École des Beaux-Arts.) Henner gave the couple one of his paintings as a wedding gift.

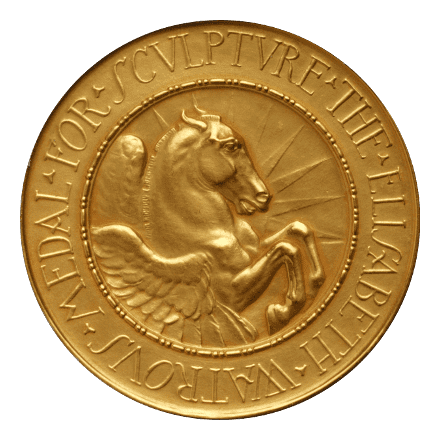
Elizabeth Watrous Medal for Sculpture

From 1908 Elizabeth had her own studio at the Gainsborough Studios in New York. She was also a novelist, author of It: Being Our Individual Magneto (1911), and another novel entitled Ti. In 1914 the Elizabeth Watrous Medal for Sculpture was established, awarded by the National Academy of Design. The medal itself was designed by Robert Ingersoll Aitken. Although Elizabeth's first name was misspelled on the medal, the error was never corrected.

Elizabeth opposed women's suffrage. In 1910, as a member of the National League for the Civic Education of Women, she headed a special committee charged with "instructing artists in the subject of anti-suffrage."

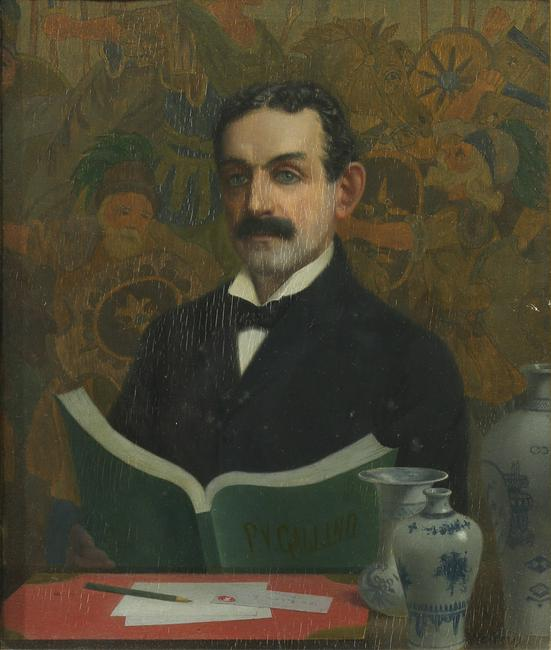
William Gilman Nichols (brother of Elizabeth Watrous), c. 1900 and before 1910, private collection.

In 1882, at age 22, her younger brother William Gilman Nichols became a partner in the high-end furniture and decorating company Herter Brothers; business analysts R.G. Dun & Co. described him as "a young man of decided artistic tastes, of good character and habits & well fitted for his present occupation." Nichols was president of Herter Brothers from 1891 until its dissolution in 1906. His marriage in 1893 to Herman O. Armour's daughter Mary was given the front-page headline "Marriage of Millionaires" in one newspaper. From 1900 the couple resided at a sprawling waterfront estate called Petronia in Rye, New York. Harry Watrous painted a portrait of Nichols, to whom he also made a gift of his painting The Line of Love. After Nichols's death at 49 in 1909, his widow and children continued to reside at Petronia.

Elizabeth's niece (daughter of her younger brother Erickson Norman Nichols) was the aviation pioneer Ruth Rowland Nichols.

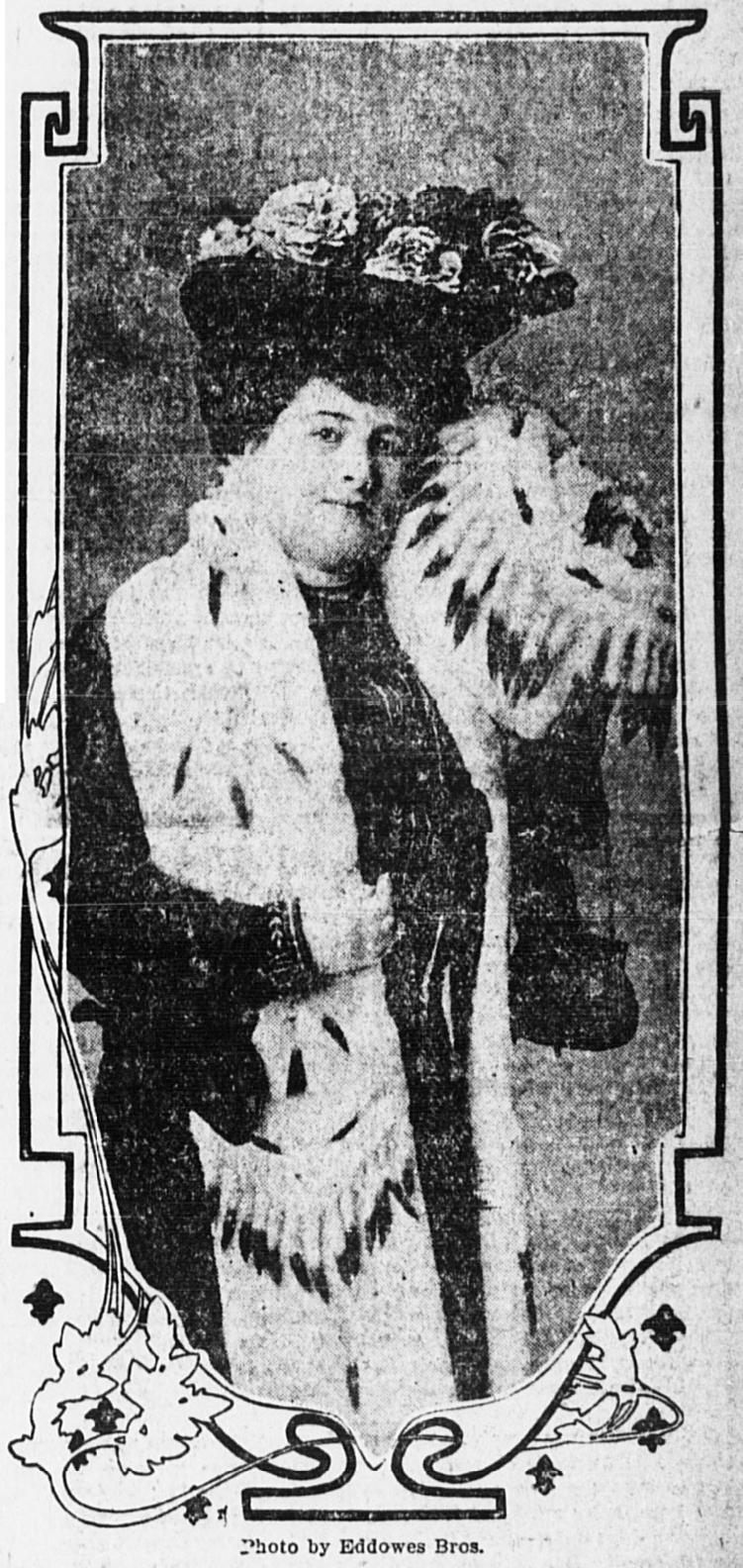
Katherine Ballou, the presumed widow of Walter Watrous, as seen on the front page of the Evening World.

Harry Watrous's younger brother Walter was a frequent figure in sporting and society pages. ("There is no more popular clubman in New York," said one newspaper.) After a scandalous divorce (his wife left him for their next-door neighbor, her best friend's husband), Walter withdrew from society. His sudden death in 1903 led to more unwanted attention from the press when it came out that he had a new wife and a residence in Atlantic City completely unknown to his friends and family. Both Harry and his mother felt obliged to comment on the situation to reporters from The New York Times and the New York Tribune. A large photo of the presumed widow dominated the front page of the Evening World. (A court would later rule that Katherine Ballou was a common-law wife and that the estate of Walter Watrous was not responsible for her $5825 debt to a dressmaker.)

In 1914 Watrous inherited a substantial estate. "By the will of his mother, Mrs. Ruth A. Watrous, who died Oct. 19, and disposed of about $260,000, which was filed for probate, Oct. 29, Harry W. Watrous gets all jewelry, paintings, books, horses, carriages, and household effects, and the residuary estate amounting to $175,000."

Harry and Elizabeth Watrous had no children.

=== Summers on Lake George; a hoax; a killing in self-defense ===
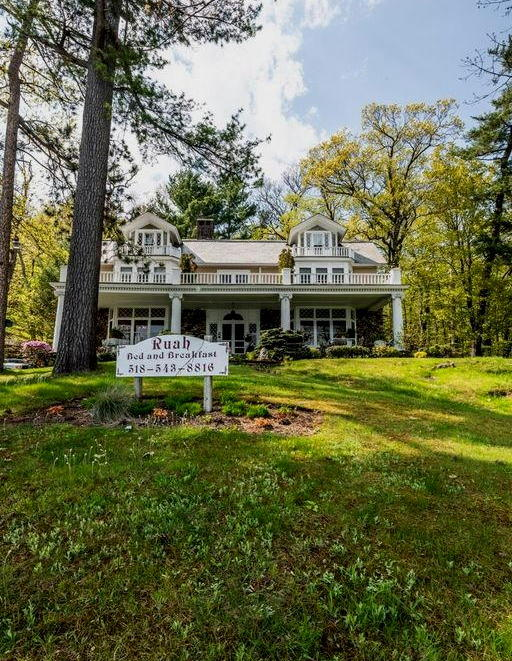
"The House that Harry and Elizabeth Watrous Built" on Lake George in 1907, until recently the Ruah Bed and Breakfast.

From 1891, Harry and Elizabeth spent their summers at Lake George in Hague, New York. An avid fisherman, Harry "won the distinction of catching the largest salmon trout" (at 24 pounds) ever taken from the lake. He was also an avid boater, owning two steam yachts christened Ruth and Camper, and winning trophies in the annual sailboat regatta.

In 1904, Harry, "known for his antics," perpetrated a hoax that became known as the Lake George Monster, a bizarre creature made of "an inflated rubber horse's head and some wires" that was repeatedly sighted at Hague Bay in Lake George. Watrous claimed the sight of the monster caused a bridegroom to desert his bride in a canoe while he frantically swam to shore and vanished in the woods.

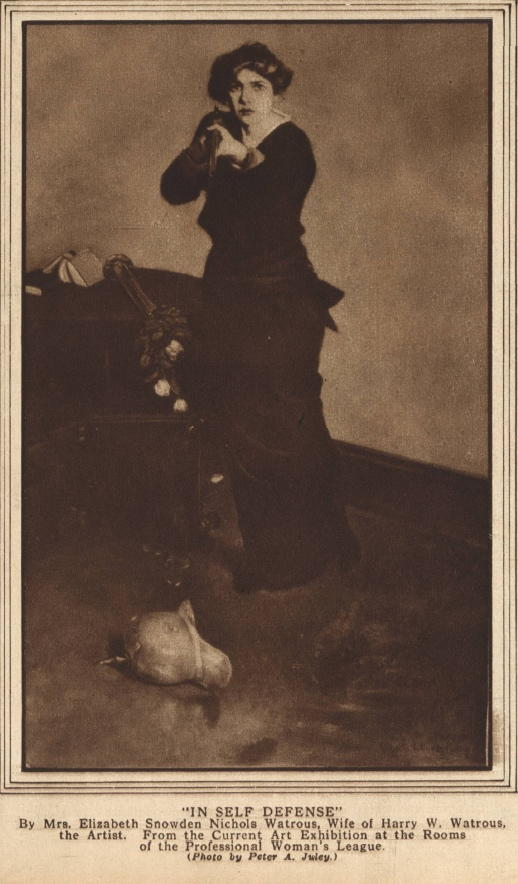
Elizabeth Watrous, In Self Defense, 1916—a wartime tableau painted three years after Harry actually did kill a man in self-defense.

The large waterfront house the Watrouses built on Lake George in 1907 is still standing. (This house "replaced a rustic building which the couple had erected on the property, one of several they built in Hague.") It was in the dining room of this house, at about 2 a.m. on Monday, 16 June 1913, that Harry Watrous, in night clothes and with a flashlight in one hand and a revolver in the other, "shot and killed, in self-defense…one of two burglars who had entered his summer villa." There were conflicting details of the incident in newspaper accounts. Frank Cardinal, age 35, was shot twice in the abodomen and died in hospital. His brother Joseph fled the scene but was later arrested. (Or as one newspaper put it, the man "got away before Watrous had a chance to shoot him.")

=== Sherwood studio; friendship with Blakelock ===
From 1886, Watrous kept a studio at the Sherwood Studio Building at 58 West 57th Street (at the corner of 6th Avenue) in New York. A visiting reporter from The New York Times declared him "the soul of geniality, despite the sign, 'Positively Will Not See Any One,' which may be found on his studio door."

Along with the serious work of painting, Watrous hosted poker games and late-night drinking parties. At an Easter "bachelor's breakfast" in his studio, cocktails were "served in a unique manner: the inside of a number of eggs will be blown out through tiny holes, and then the cocktail will be put in, sealed up, and the eggs will be broken by the guests."

It was at the Sherwood building that Watrous befriended the eccentric painter Ralph Blakelock, whose studio adjoined Watrous's until Blakelock's impoverishment forced him to give it up, after which Watrous often allowed Blakelock free access to his own studio.

Blakelock found a loyal advocate in the young Harry Watrous, with whom he appears to have had almost nothing in common. A decade older than Watrous, Blakelock was self-taught, whereas Watrous studied art in Paris; Blakelock was poor, Watrous affluent; Blakelock had few friends, Watrous joined New York's leading clubs; Blakelock mostly painted wilderness, Watrous painted beautiful young women in elegant interiors. [It might also be noted that Blakelock had nine children, and Watrous none.] Nevertheless…Watrous became Blakelock's great ally, buying many of Blakelock's works himself and helping to sell others. Throughout Blakelock's life, and after his death, Watrous would work steadily to promote Blakelock's art and safeguard his legacy.

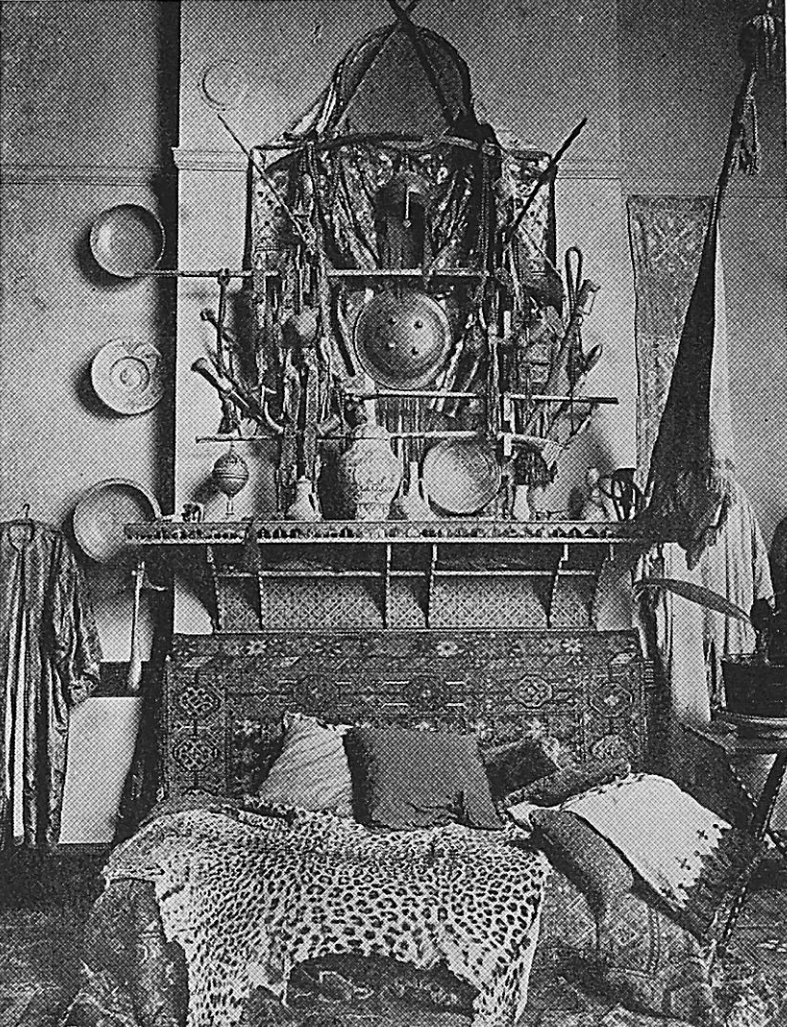
The studio of Harry Watrous, c. 1895

This friendship was sometimes sorely tested. One summer while Watrous was away, "Blakelock was given permission to use his studio, in which were stored some rare old priestly vestments, that in former time had been worn by bishops and cardinals. When he returned he was horrified to find that Blakelock had been turning the old red and flowered cloths to a practical use, his family of some eight or ten children being dressed in them, while the entire group enjoyed the comforts of the large studio."

Watrous was Blakelock's "most faithful supporter, both during the productive decades of the 1880s and 1890s and during the period of his confinement" for mental illness. "Over the years, when Blakelock was in financial need, Watrous handled his work for him, selling it to art dealers and collectors, something Blakelock often could not manage for himself." A profile of Watrous from 1923 noted that "he made it his practice to help Blakelock to the extent of his ability by buying his pictures, until at one time he had so many Blakelocks that he gave them away as wedding presents. Now he realizes, and he smiles as he contemplates the lost opportunity, that he might have had a small fortune had he kept those pictures and sold them after the boom in Blakelocks arrived."

Some anecdotes about Watrous and Blakelock are related in American Paintings in the Metropolitan Museum of Art, Vol. III.

=== Final years ===
Watrous was widowed in 1921. At the time of his death in 1940 he was living with his closest surviving relative, an unmarried cousin, Anne Watrous, at 17 East 89th Street in Manhattan. "A good painter with a lovable personality has been lost in Harry Watrous," said his obituary in the New York Herald Tribune. "He was universally likeable. He had a bubbling sense of humor, besides kindness and never-failing good will.…Harry Watrous had charm and it was the more potent because he gave no thought to its cultivation but was simply and spontaneously his engaging self. His long career has left its mark, the mark of a devoted artist and a high-minded gentleman."

== In museums and at auction ==
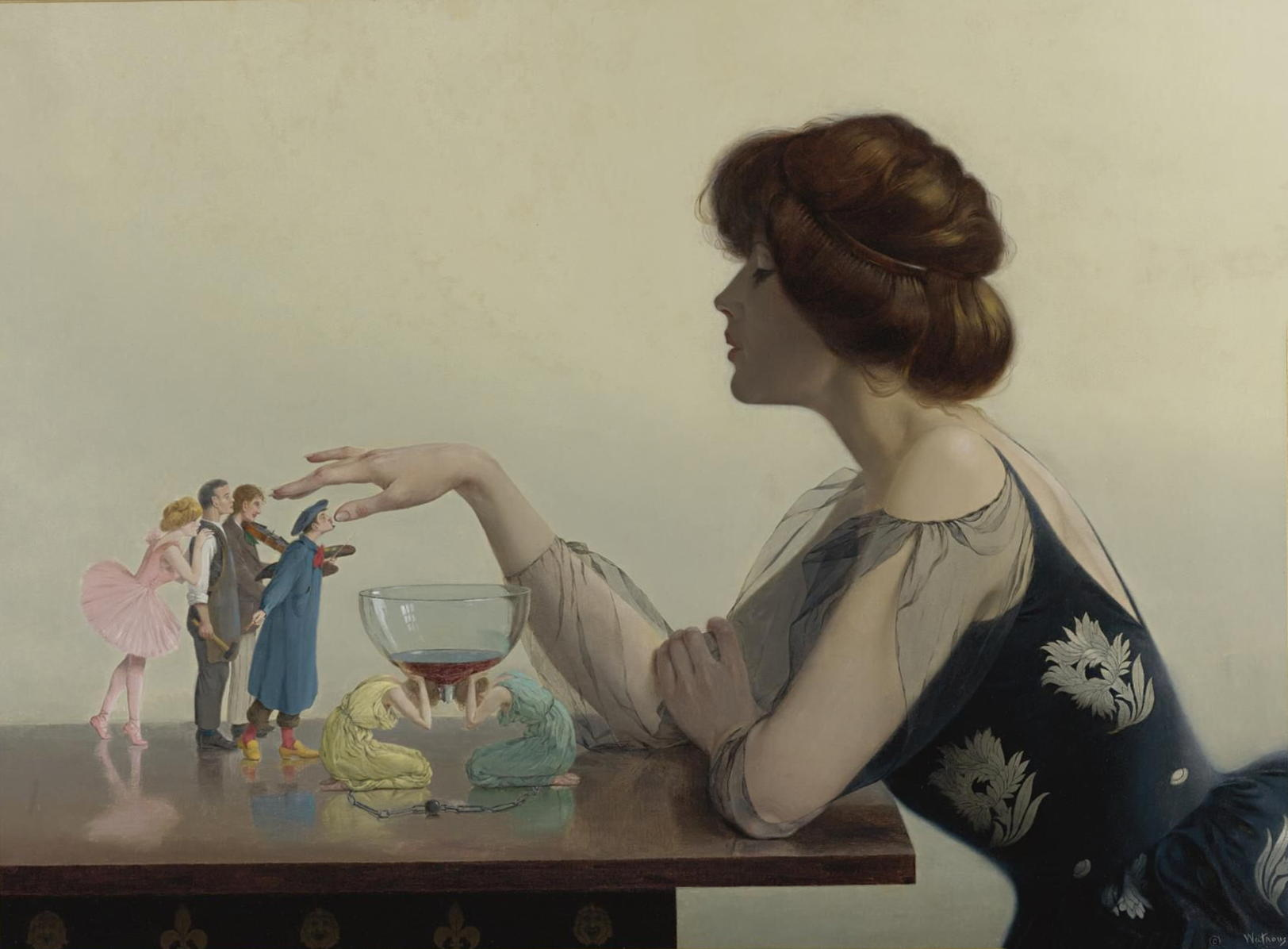
The Dregs, 1914, private collection, set an auction record for Watrous at $67,000.

Watrous paintings are in the collections of The Metropolitan Museum of Art, The National Arts Club, The Brooklyn Museum of Art, Albright-Knox Art Gallery, Sterling and Francine Clark Art Institute, Pennsylvania Academy of the Fine Arts, The Portland Museum of Art, Paine Art Center and Gardens, Museum of Art at Brigham Young University, and The Haggin Museum.

The Parakeet Ring (aka The Wreckers) was auctioned at Heritage Auctions, Dallas, in 2024 for $28,000. A Watrous painting described as "Still Life with Blue and White Porcelain" was auctioned at Doyle New York in 2022 for $11,000. His painting Rose Madonna (1934), sold in 1940 for $735, was auctioned in 2022 at Cottone Auctions in Geneseo, New York, for $12,000. An Old Saint (undated) was auctioned at Rago Arts and Auction Center in 2021 for $12,000. The Line of Love (1909 or before) was auctioned in 2018 by Christie's for $37,500. An undated still life was sold at auction at Sotheby's in 2013 for $15,000. My Lady Nicotine (1894) was sold at Flying Pig Auctions in 2010 for $22,000. The Suitors (c. 1910) was auctioned in 2007 by Christie's for $33,600. The Dregs (1914) was auctioned in 2007 by Sotheby's for $67,000. Waiting in the Library (undated) was auctioned at Skinner in 2006 for $18,800.

== Gallery (chronological) ==
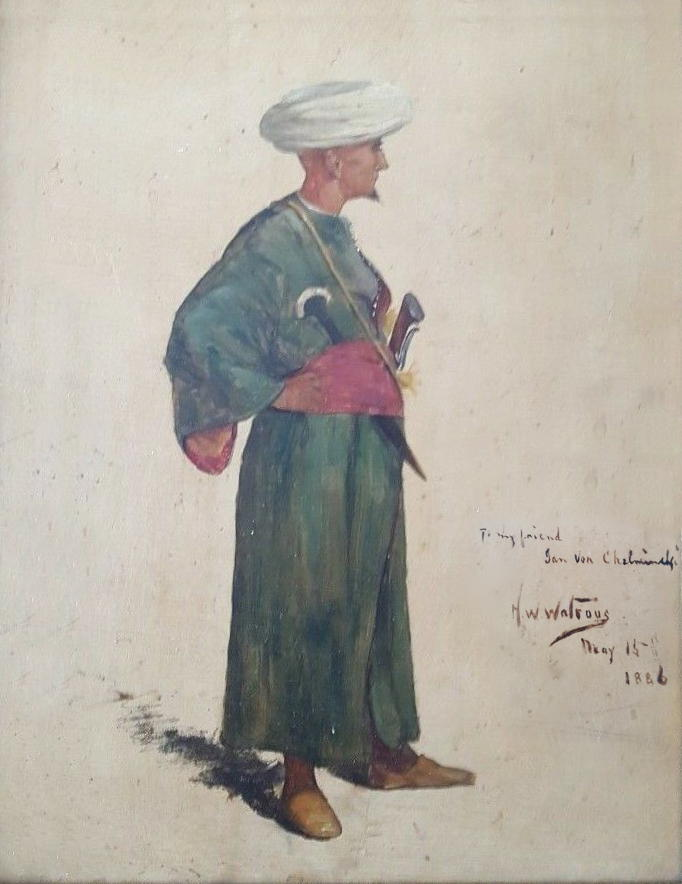
Untitled, 1886, private collection

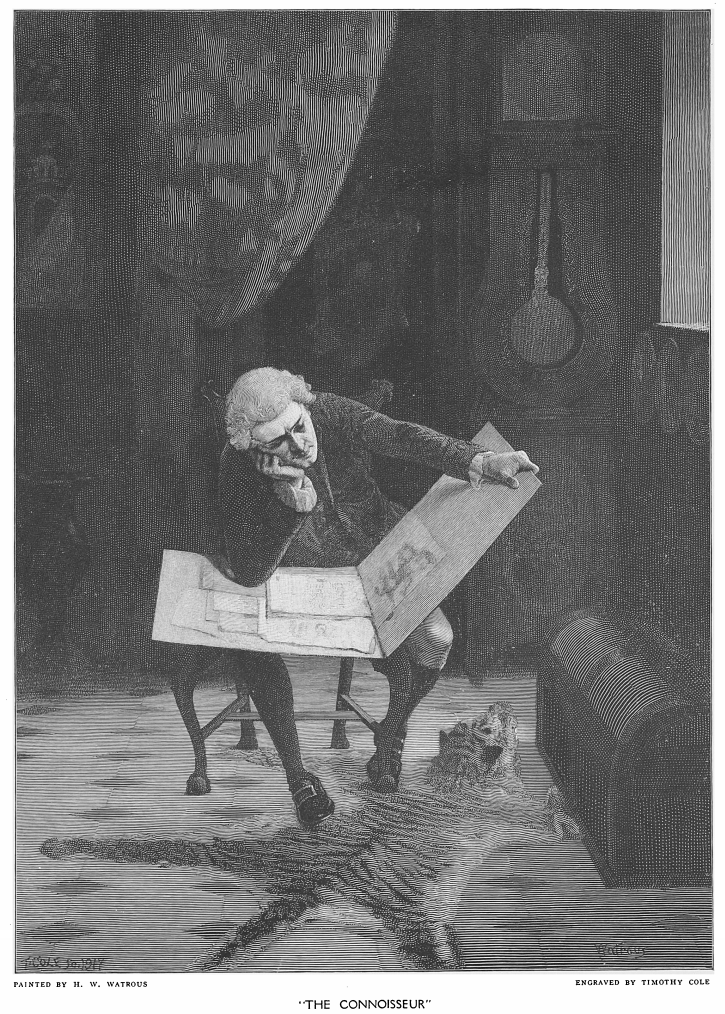
The Connoisseur, c. 1883–1888; engraving by Timothy Cole,1917

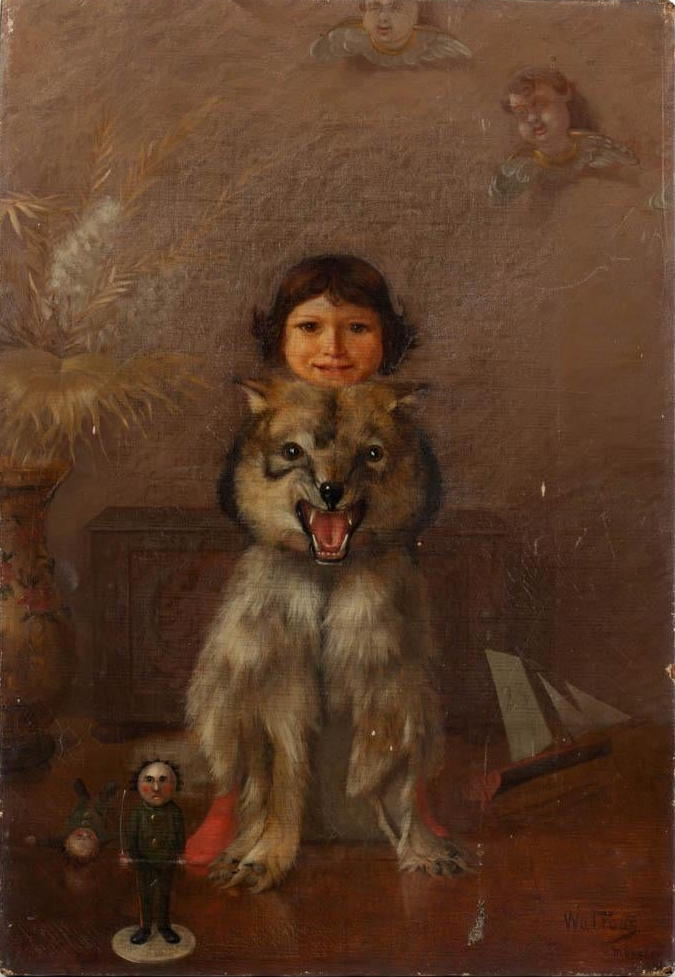
München, 1888, private collection

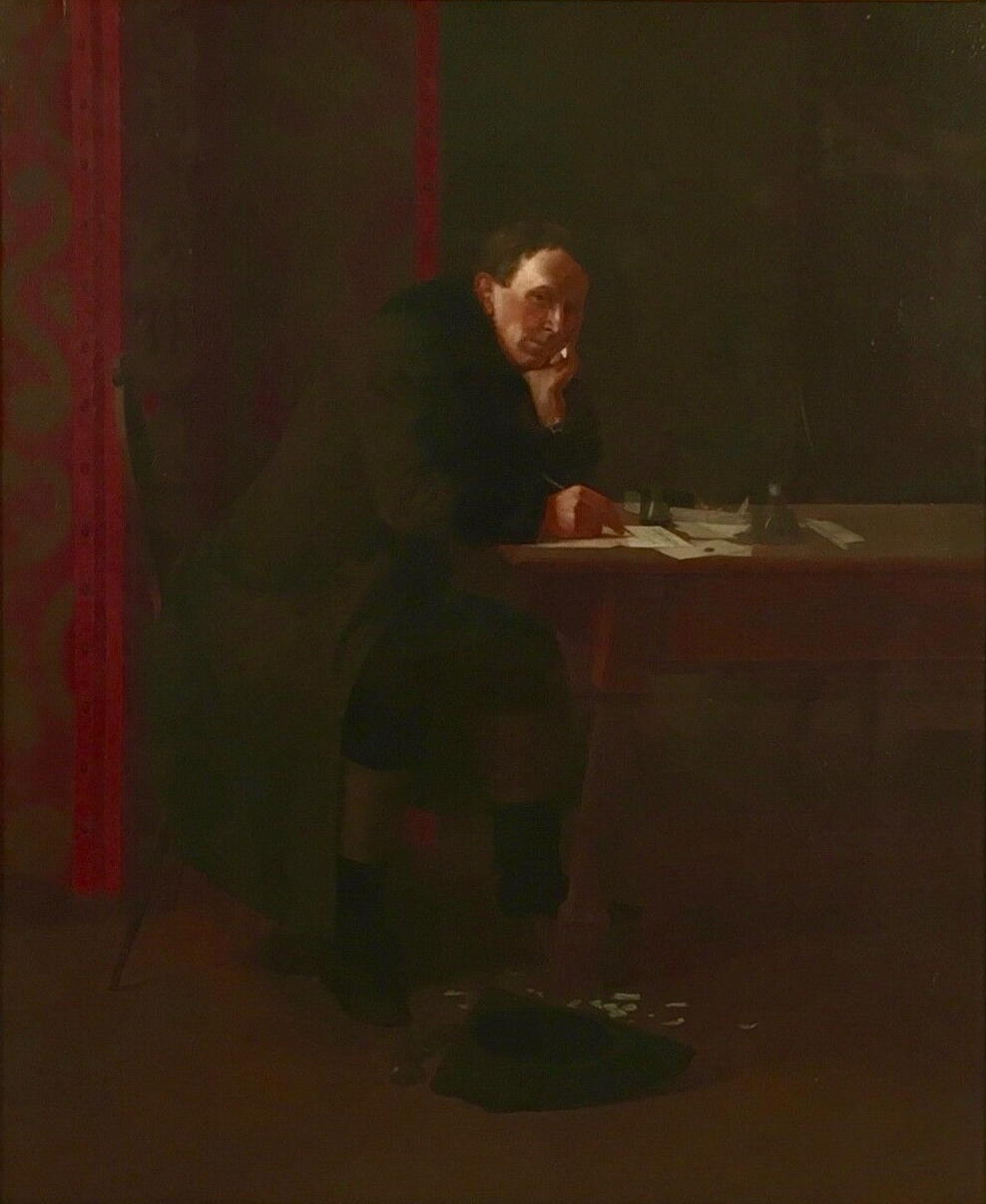
Untitled, 1889, private collection

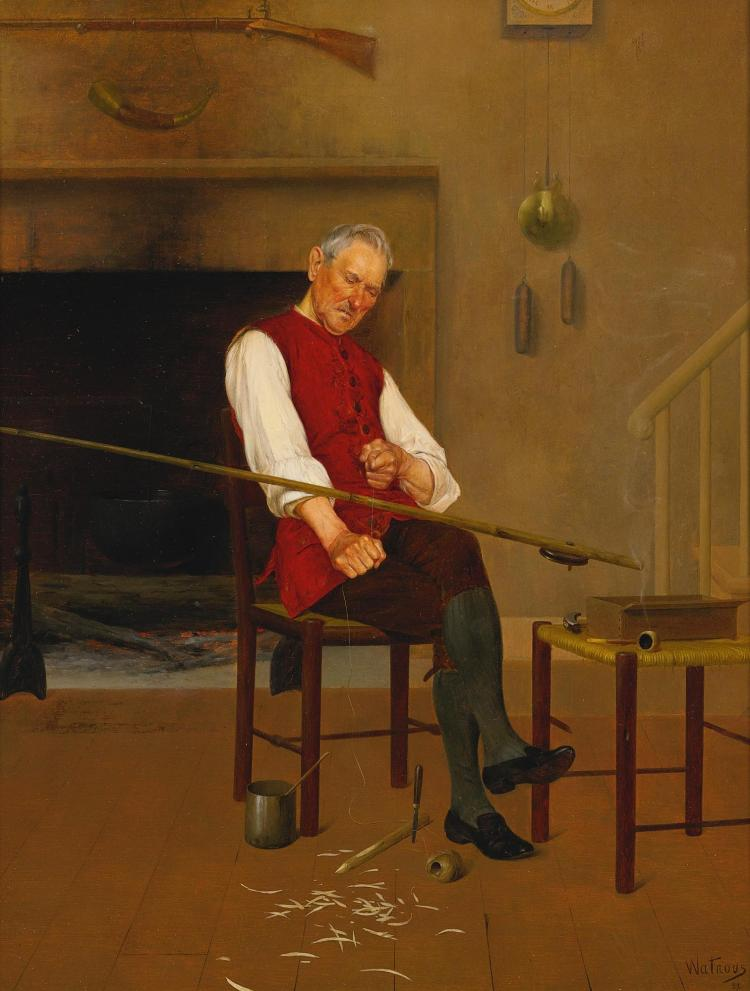
The Fishing Pole, 1889, private collection

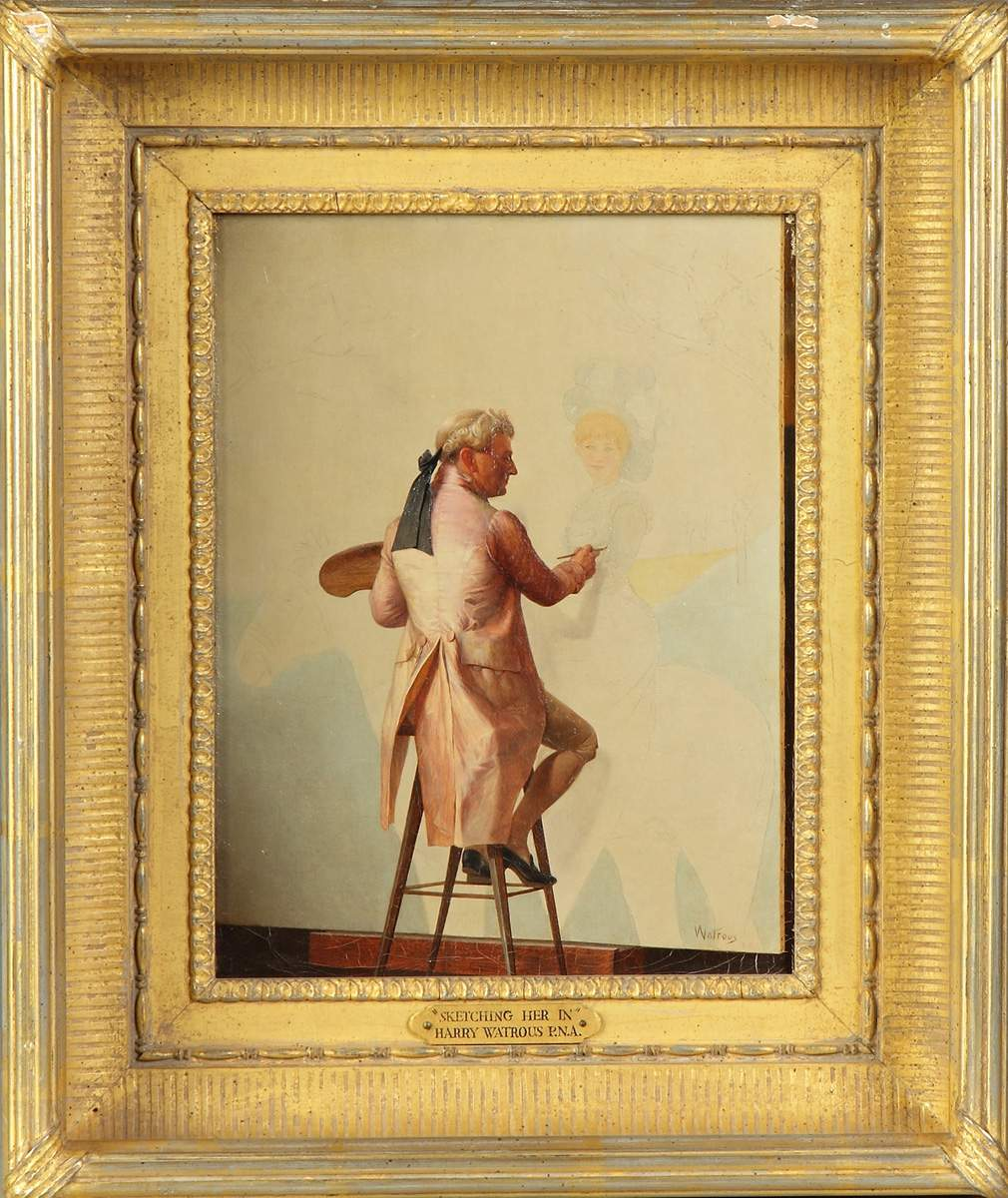
Sketching Her In, by 1890, private collection

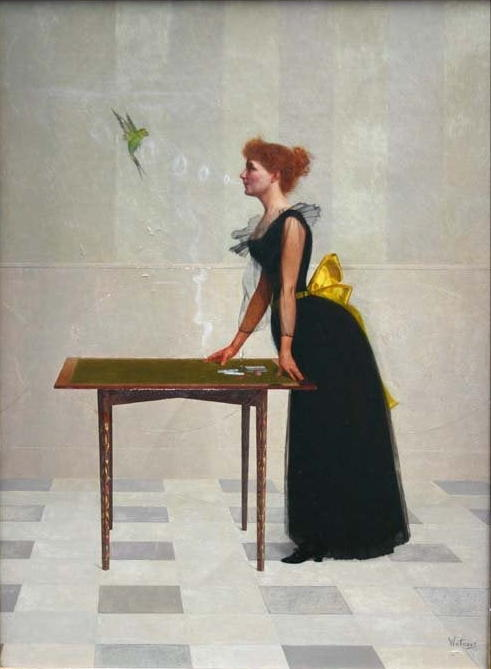
My Lady Nicotine, 1894, private collection

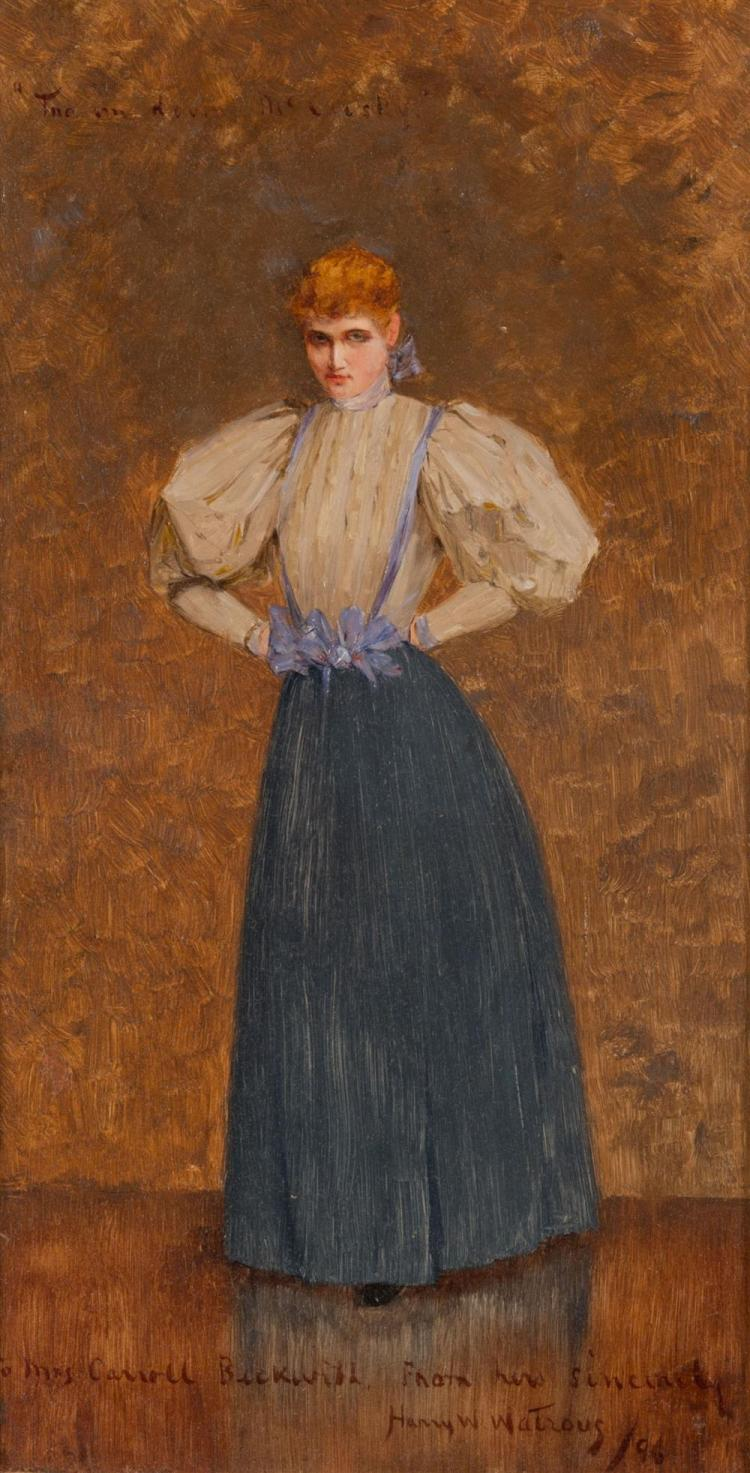
"Tro 'im down, McClosky", 1896, private collection

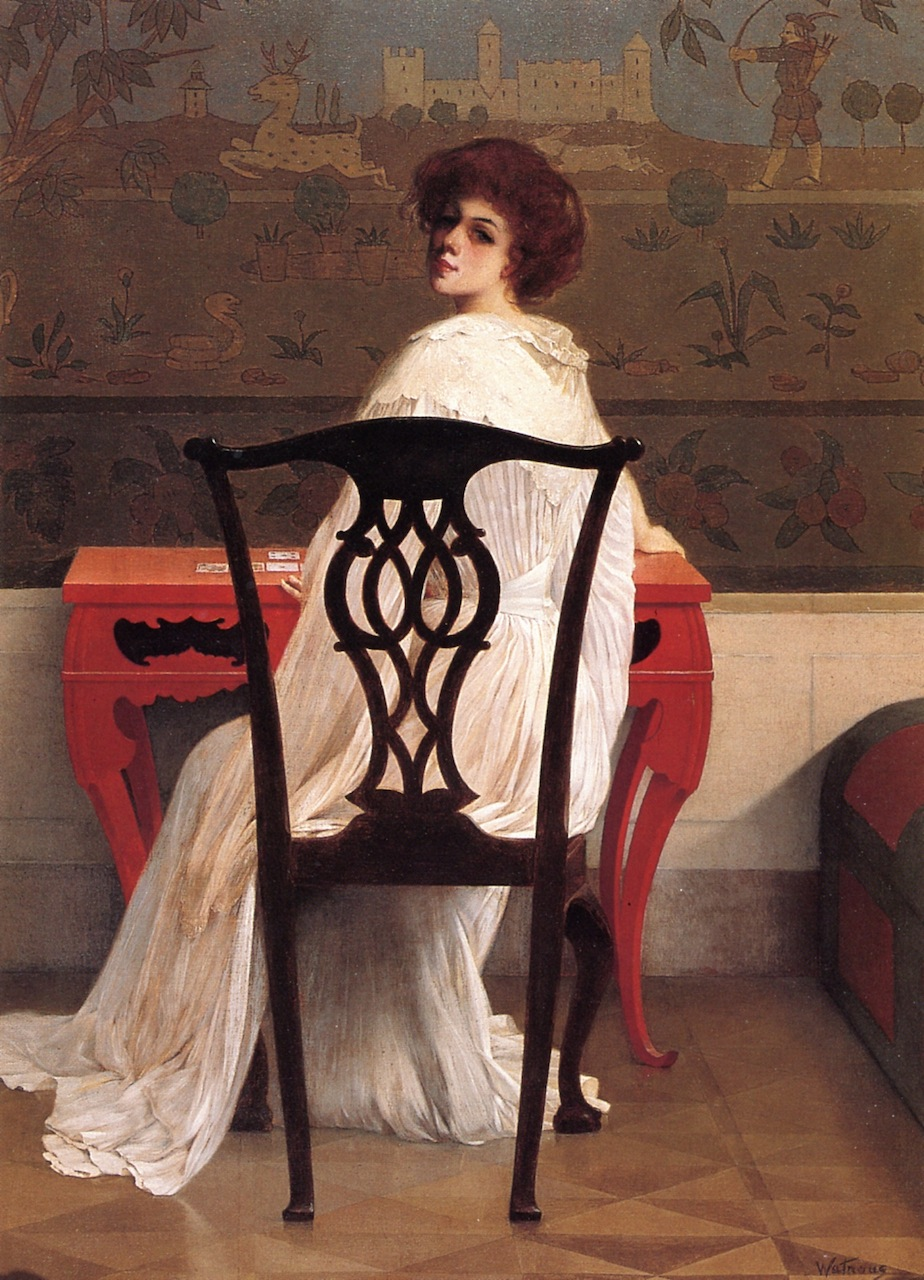
Solitaire, c. 1900; the table also appears in In the Artist's Studio

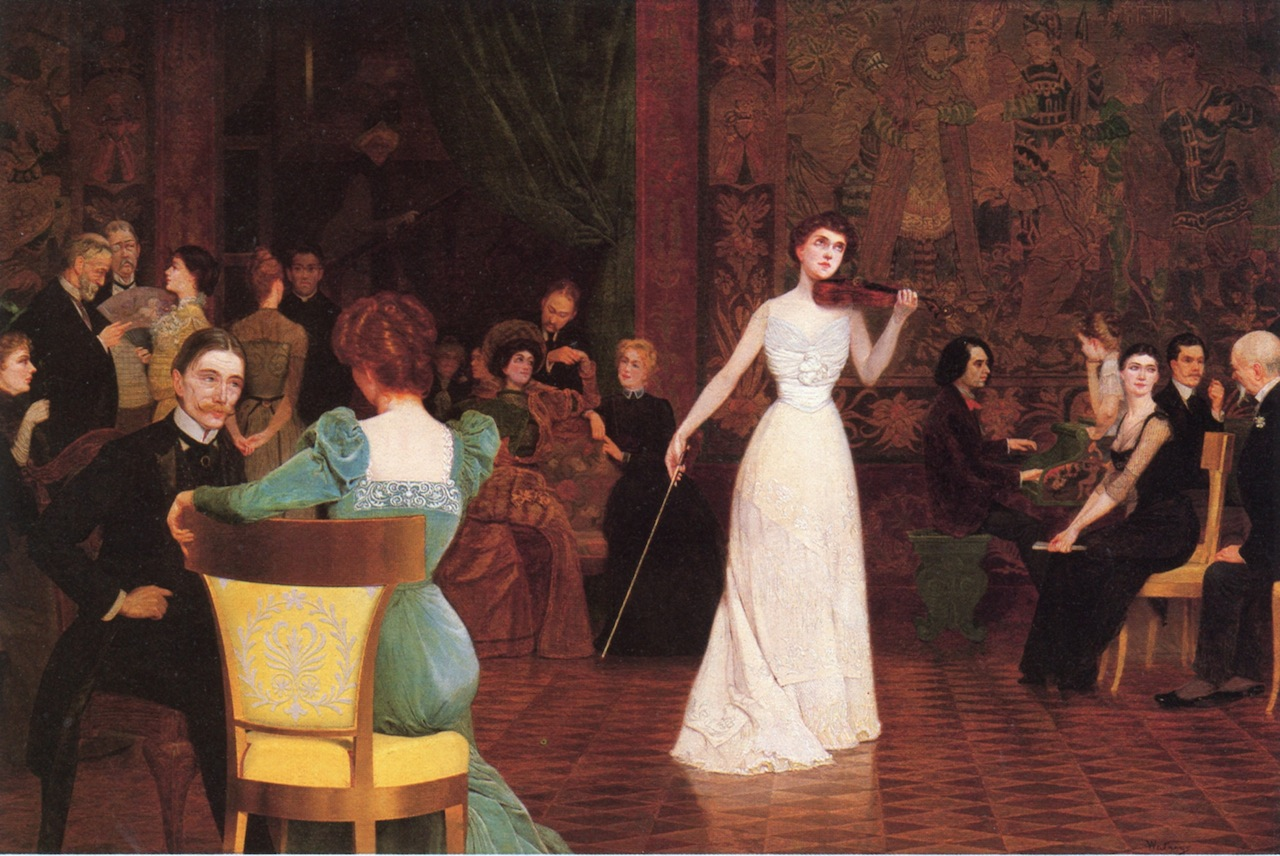
The Concert, 1903, private collection

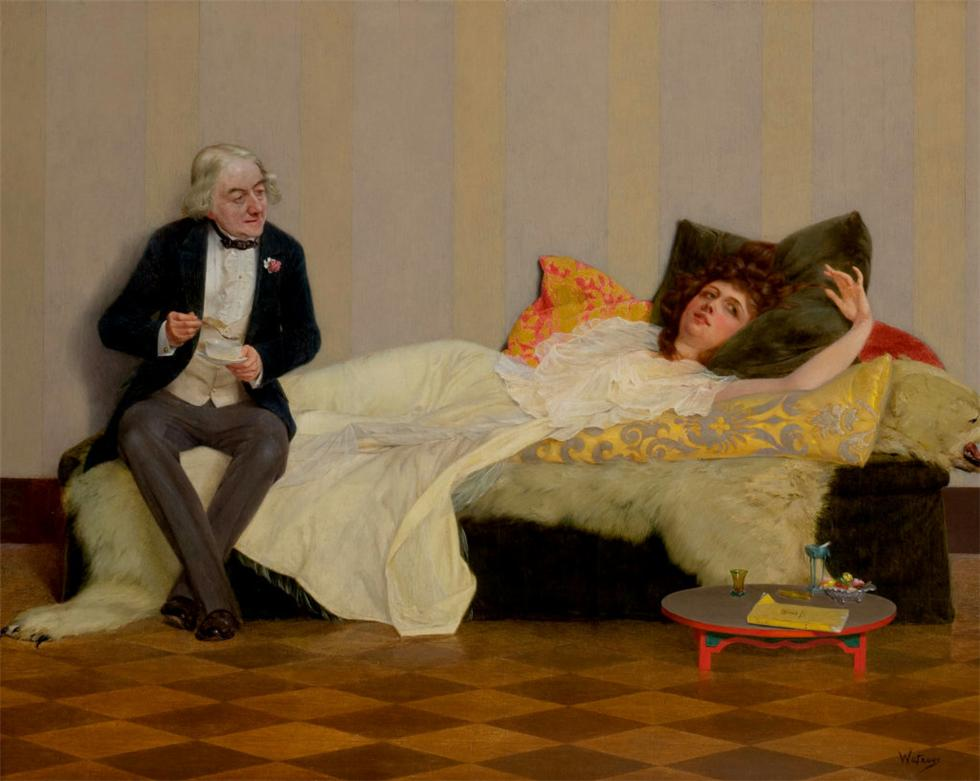
House Call, undated

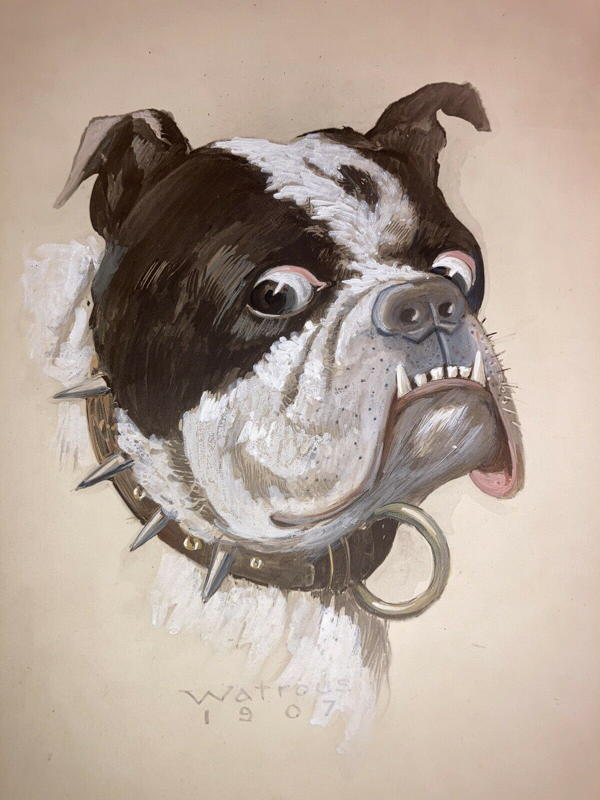
Untitled watercolor, 1907, private collection

Sophistication (aka Cup of Tea, Cigarette, and She), 1908, Haggin Museum

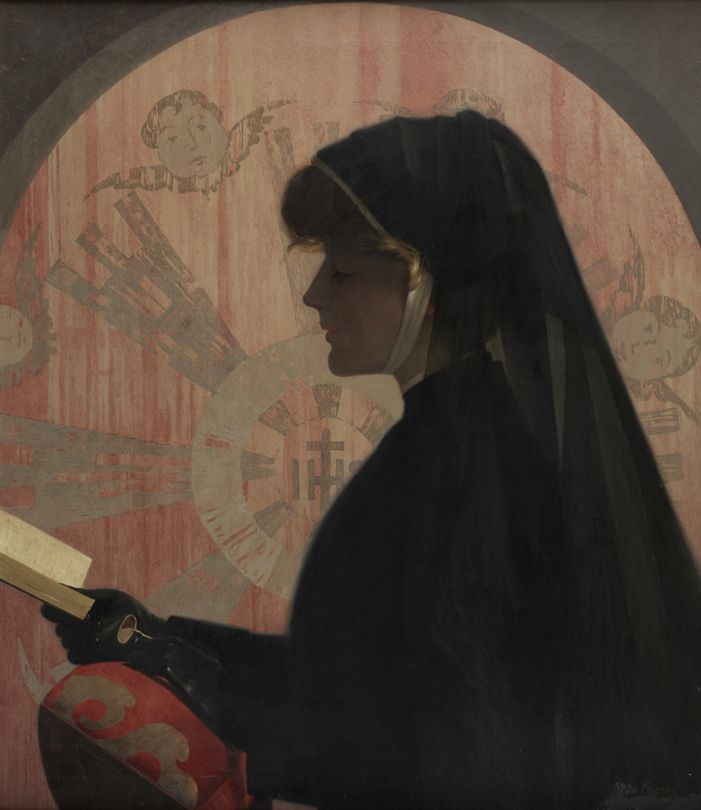
Devotion (aka Fair Penitent), 1908, Pennsylvania Academy of Fine Arts

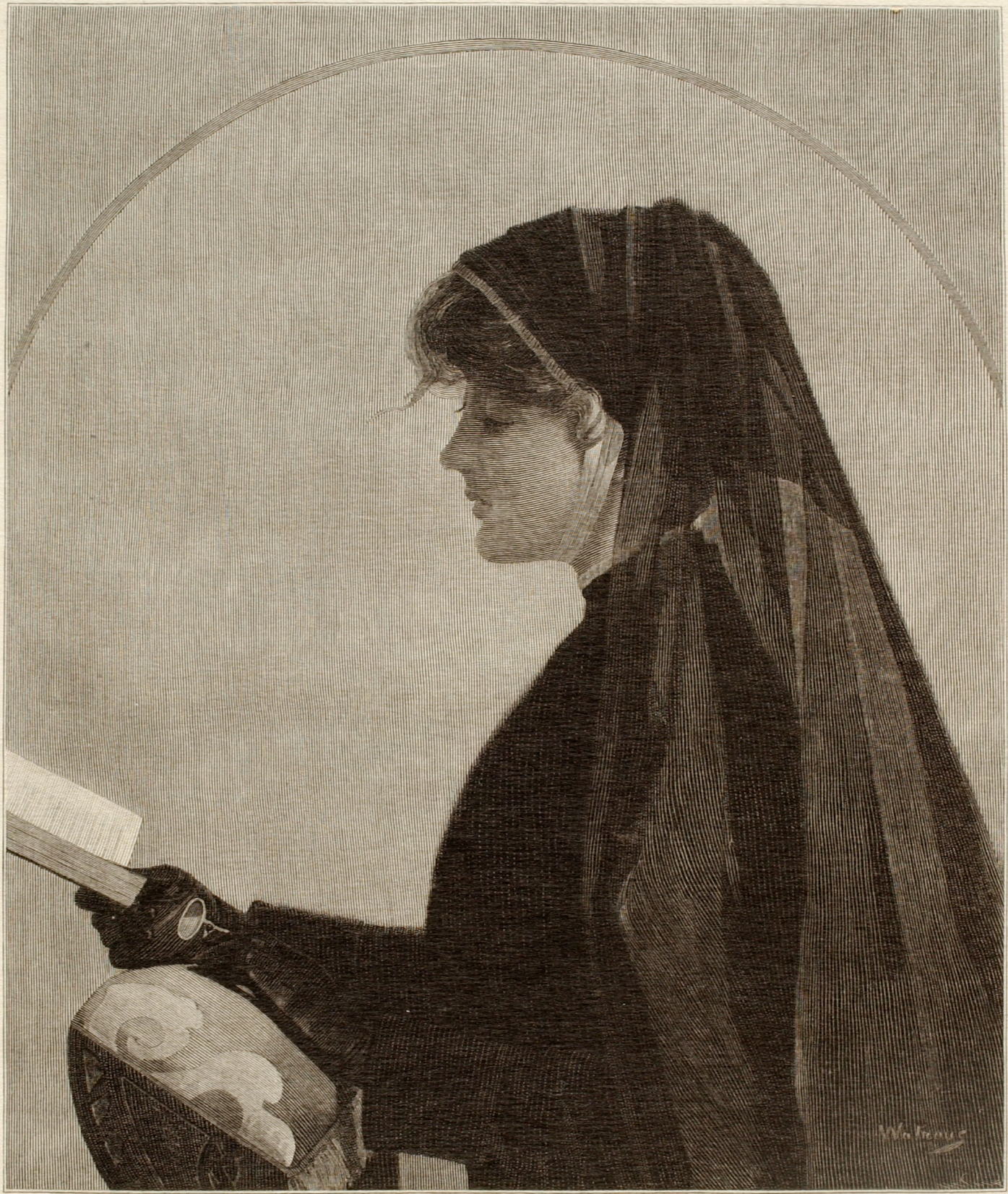
Henry Wolf after Harry Watrous, In Church (aka Fair Penitent or Devotion), wood engraving on paper, 1909, Smithsonian American Art Museum

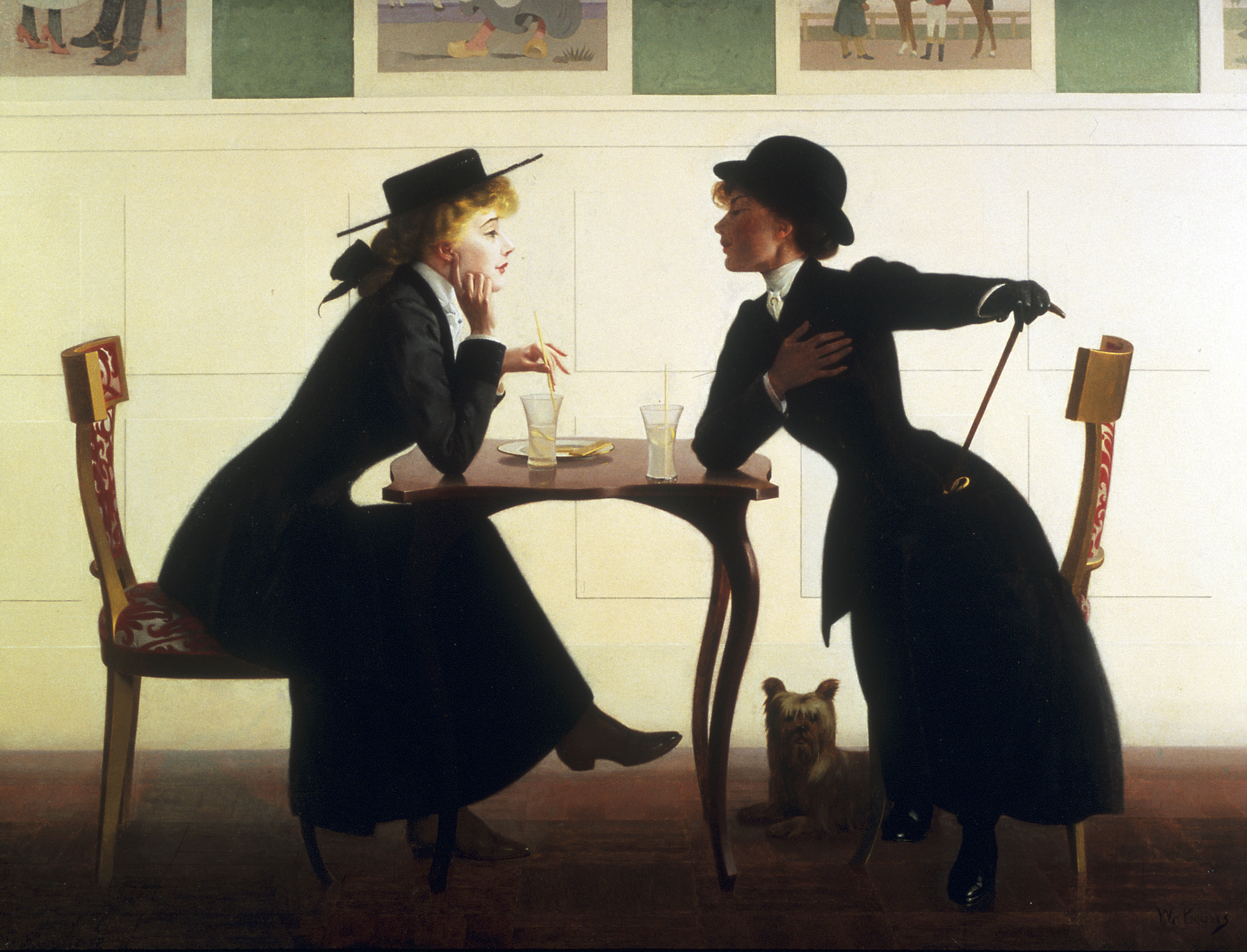
"Some Little Talk of Me and Thee There Was", 1905–9, National Arts Club

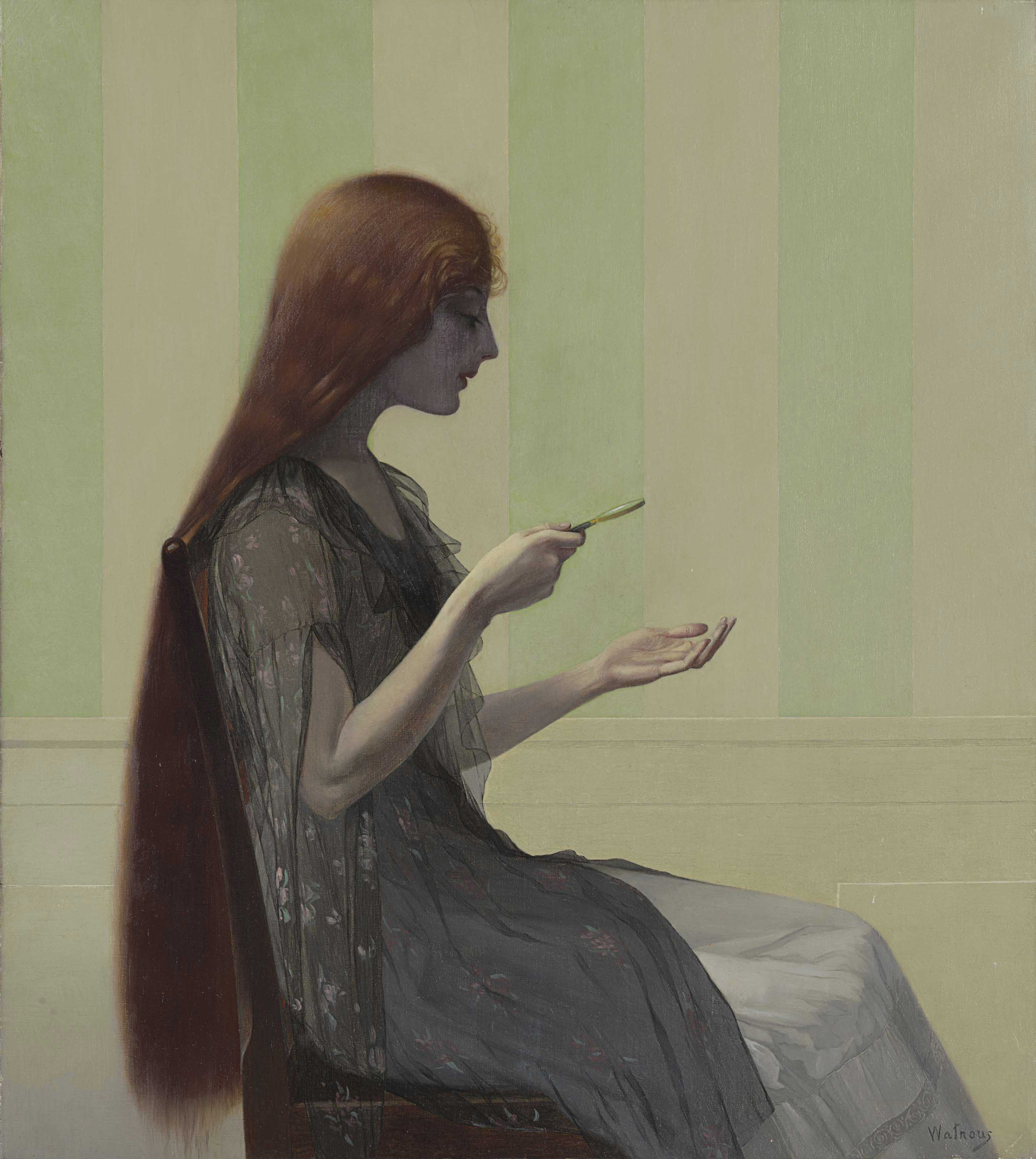
The Line of Love, 1909 or before, private collection

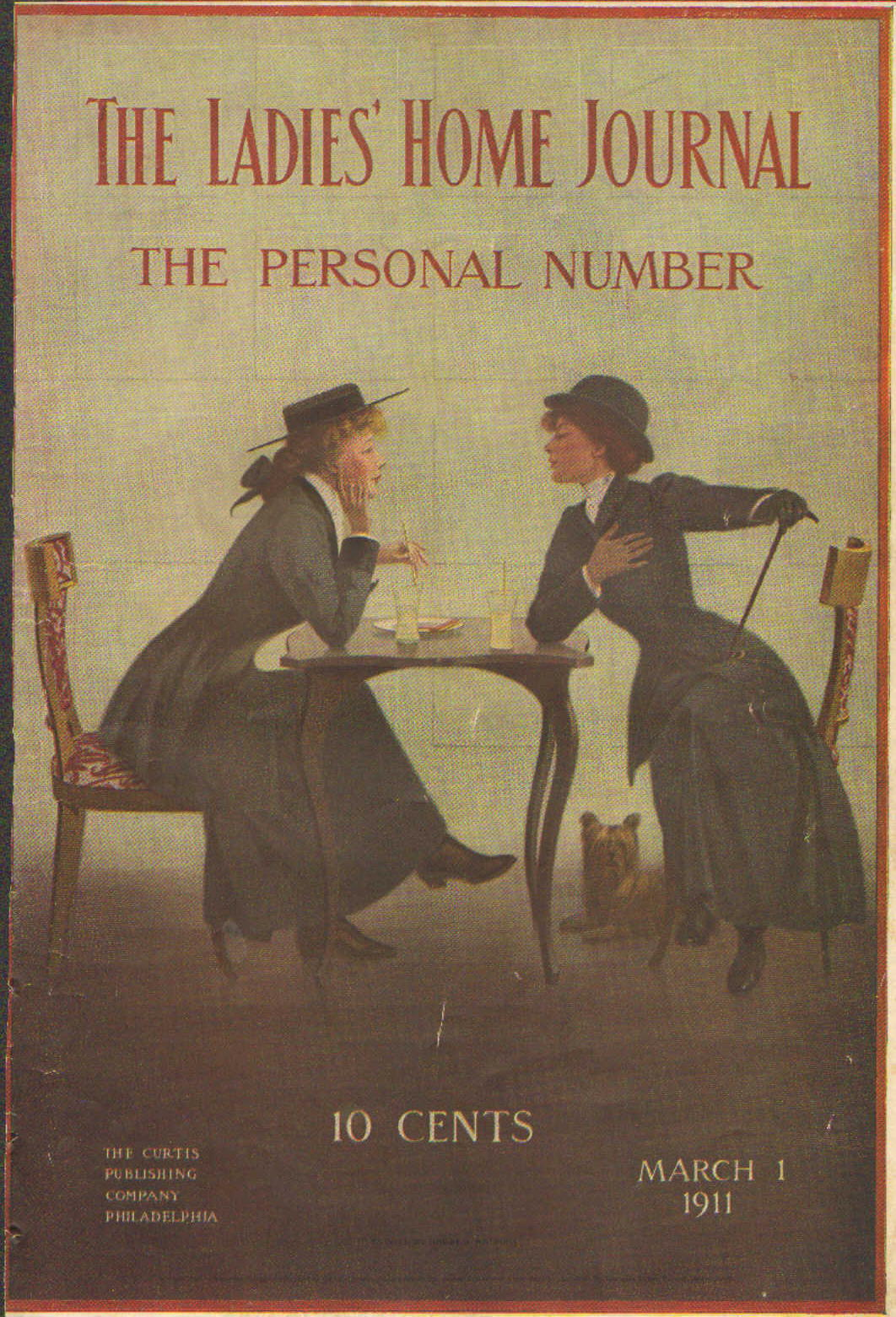
"Some Little Talk of Me and Thee There Was", cover, The Ladies' Home Journal, 1 March 1911

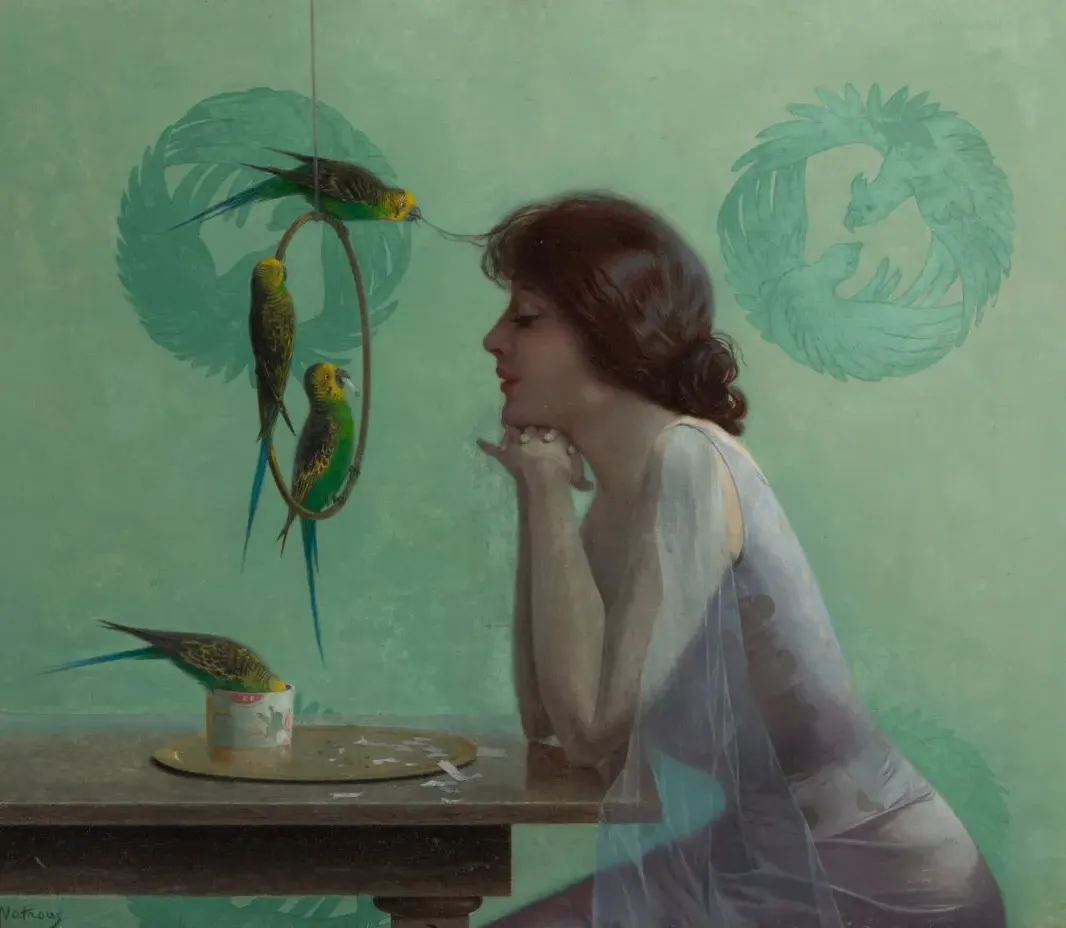
The Parakeet Ring, c. 1910, private collection

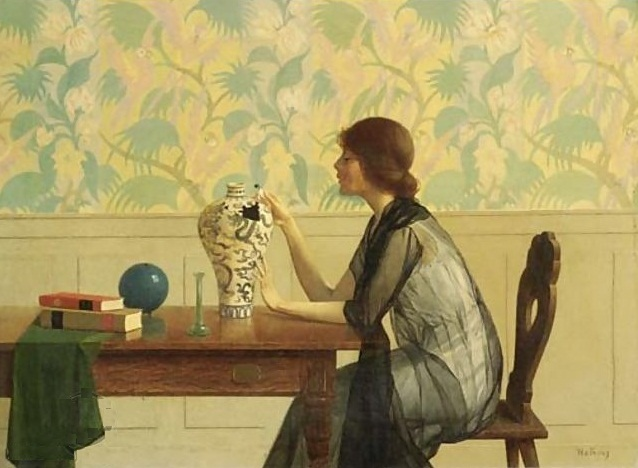
The Broken Vase, c. 1910

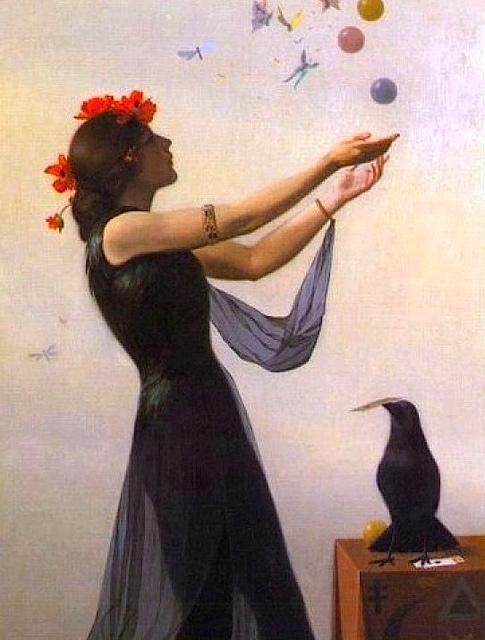
The Magician, c. 1910

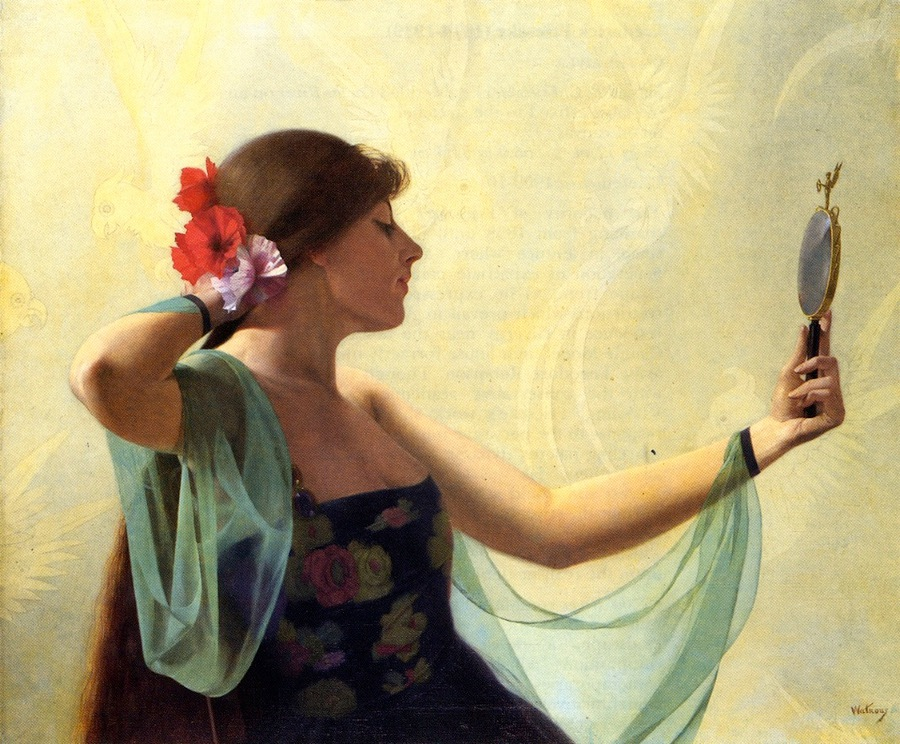
Girl with the Mirror aka Italia, c. 1910, private collection

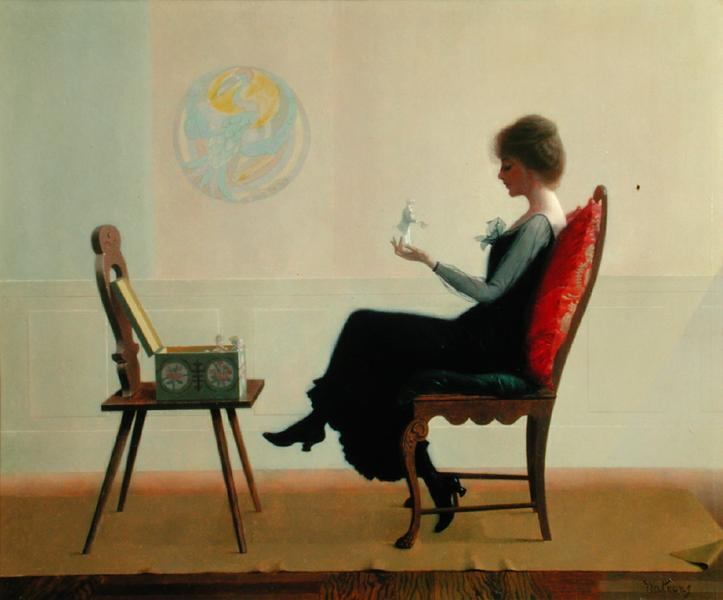
The Suitors, c. 1910, private collection

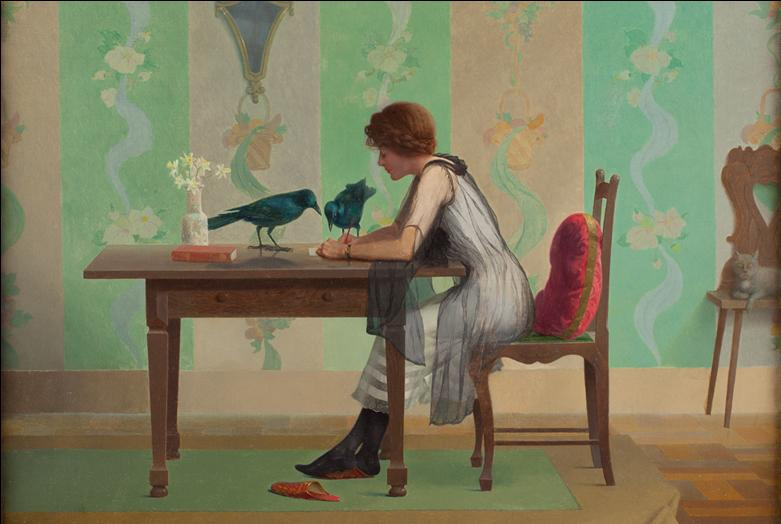
The Composers, c. 1910, Paine Art Center and Gardens, Oshkosh, Wisconsin

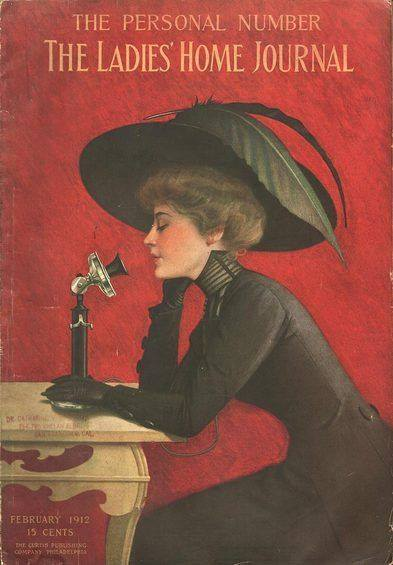
The Girl at the Telephone, cover, The Ladies' Home Journal, February, 1912

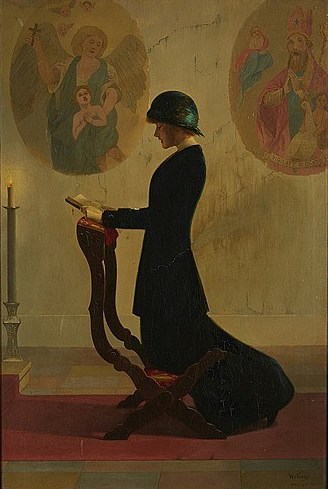
Woman at Prayer, 1912, private collection

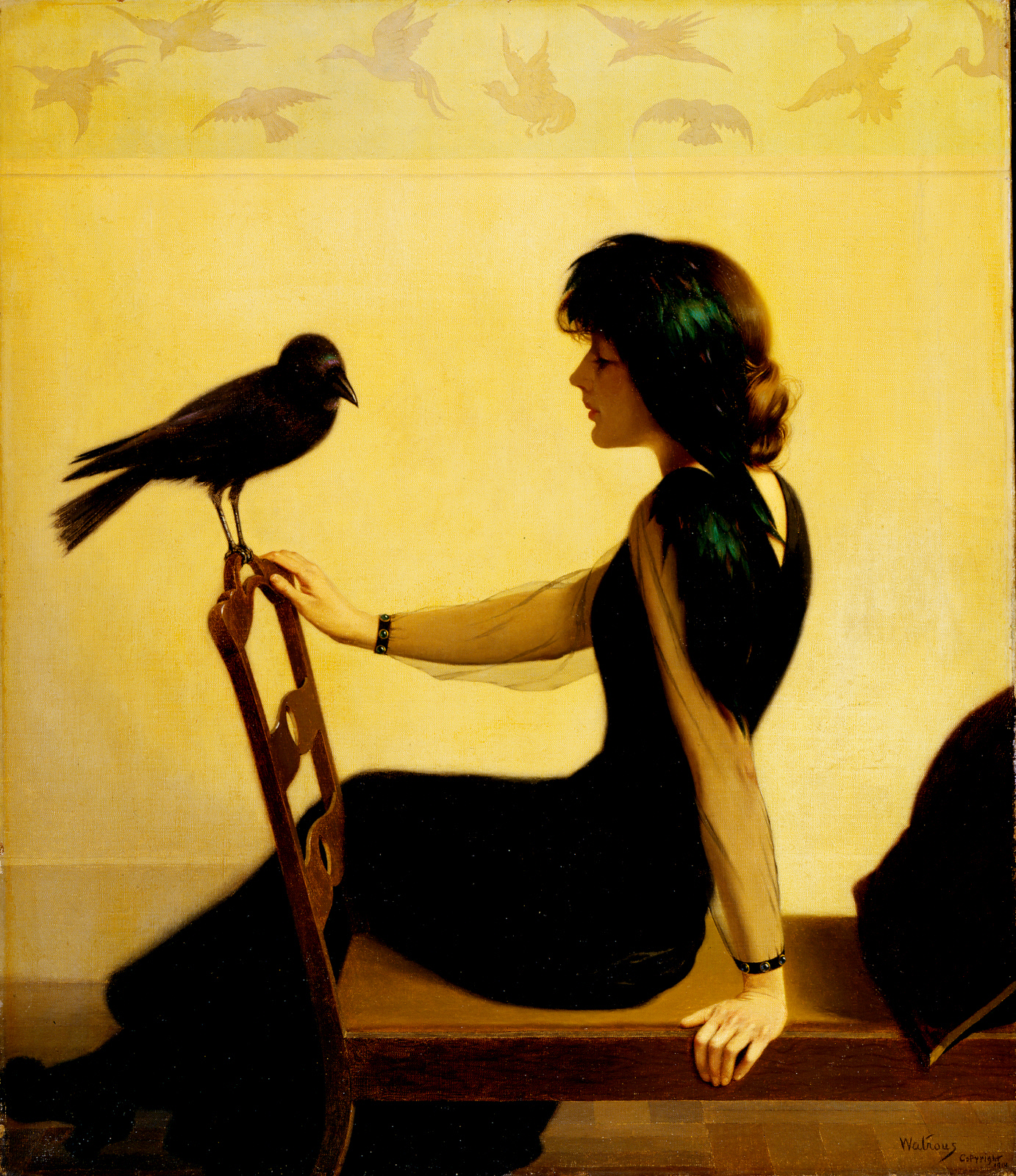
The Chatterers, 1913, Clark Art Institute

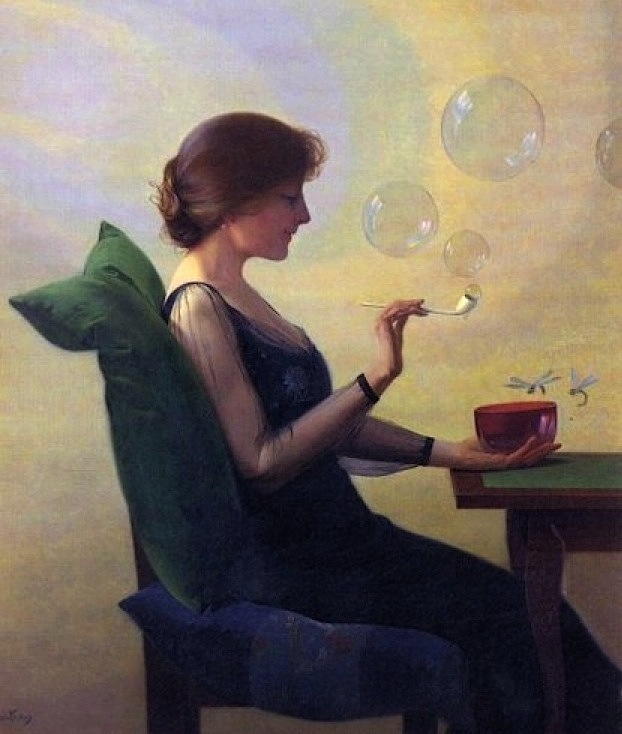
Soap Bubbles, 1914

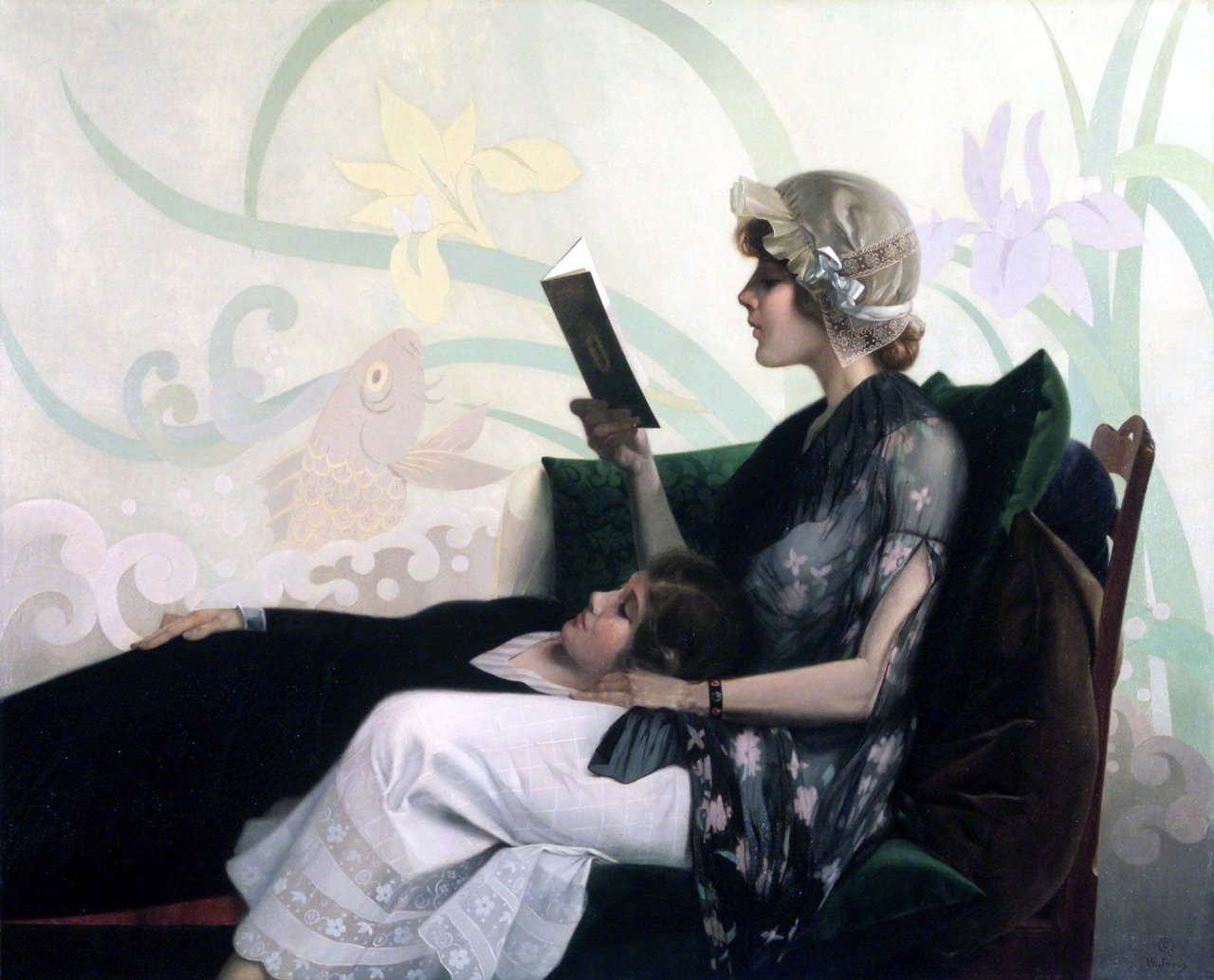
Just a Couple of Girls, 1915, Brooklyn Museum

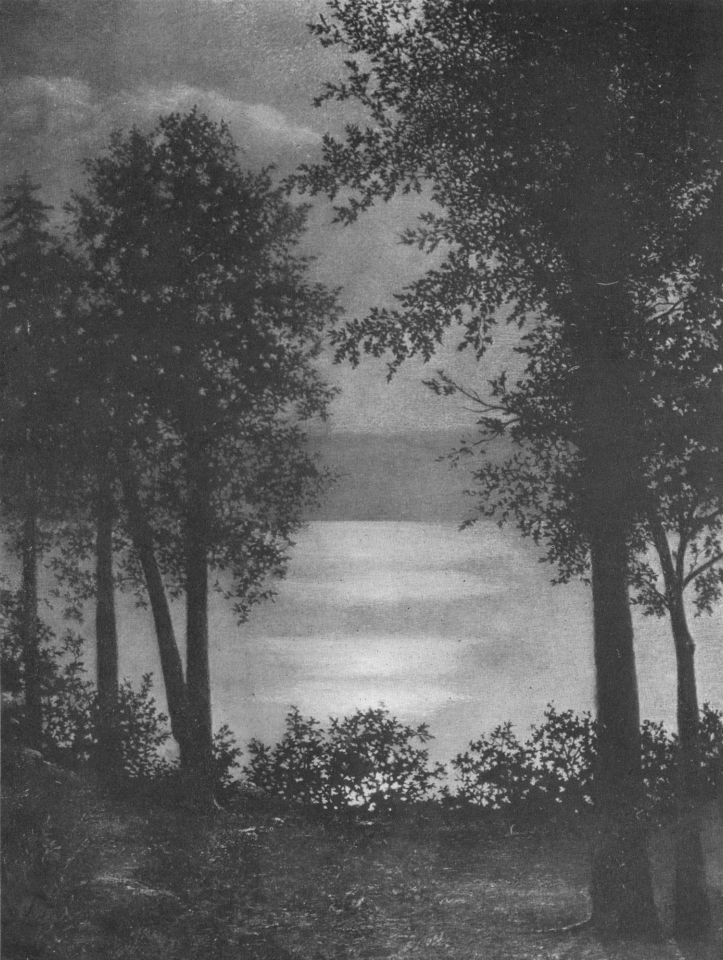
The Moon Path, 1918, location unknown

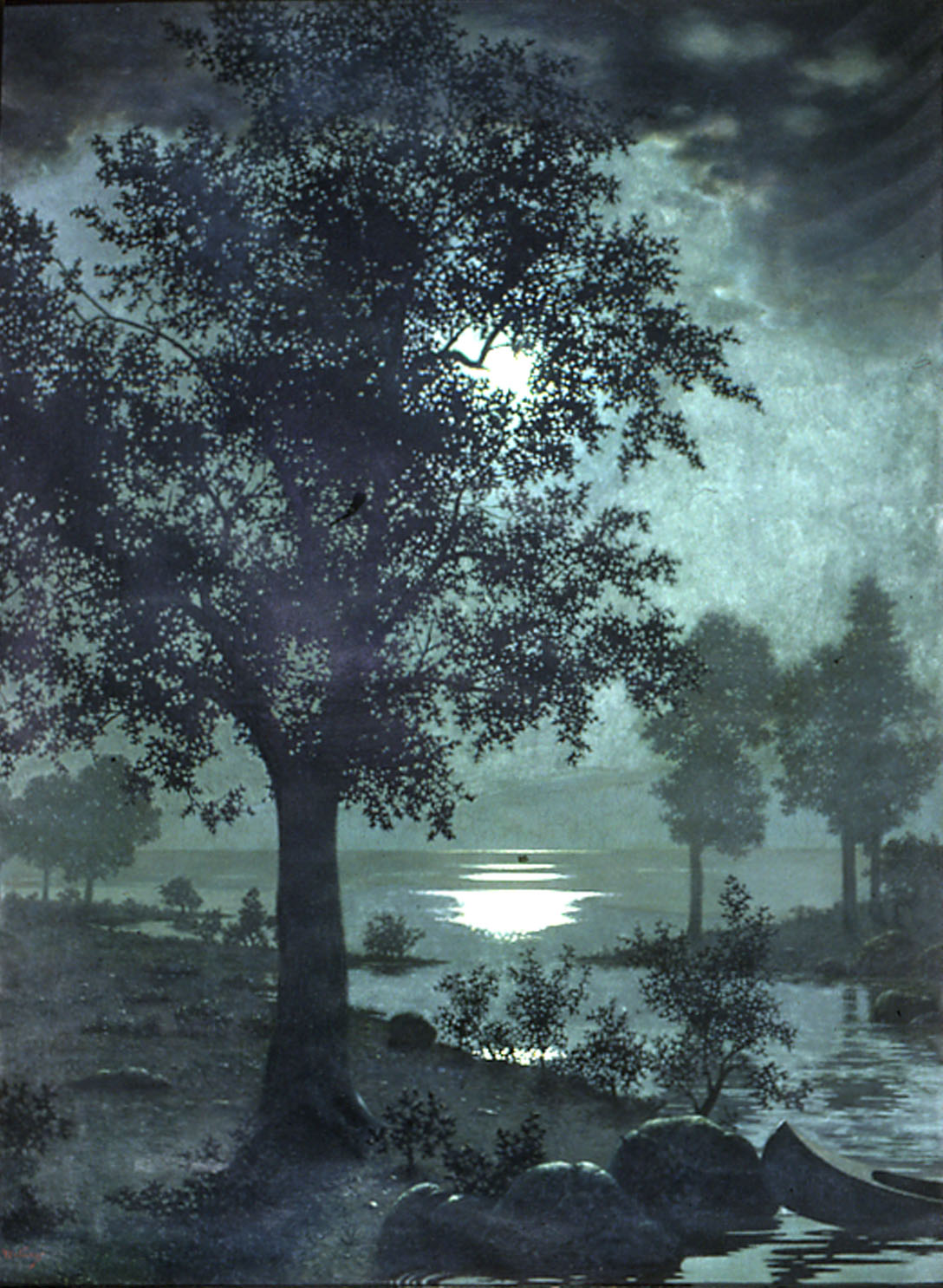
The Inlet, c. 1918–1923, Portland Museum of Art

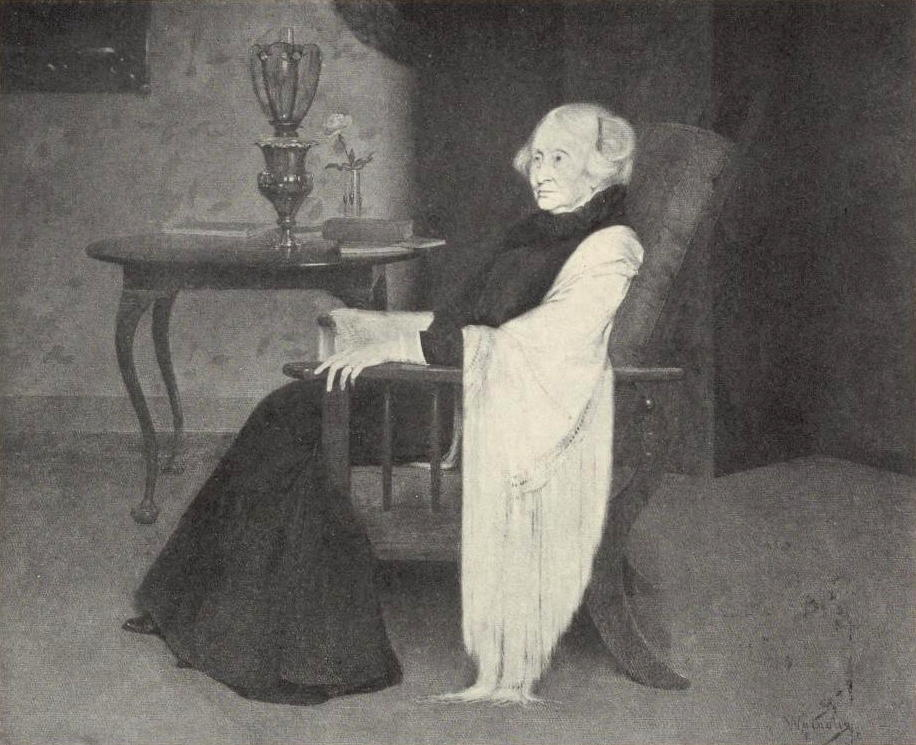
Portrait of My Mother, 1915; given by the artist to the Corcoran Gallery in 1926; present location unknown

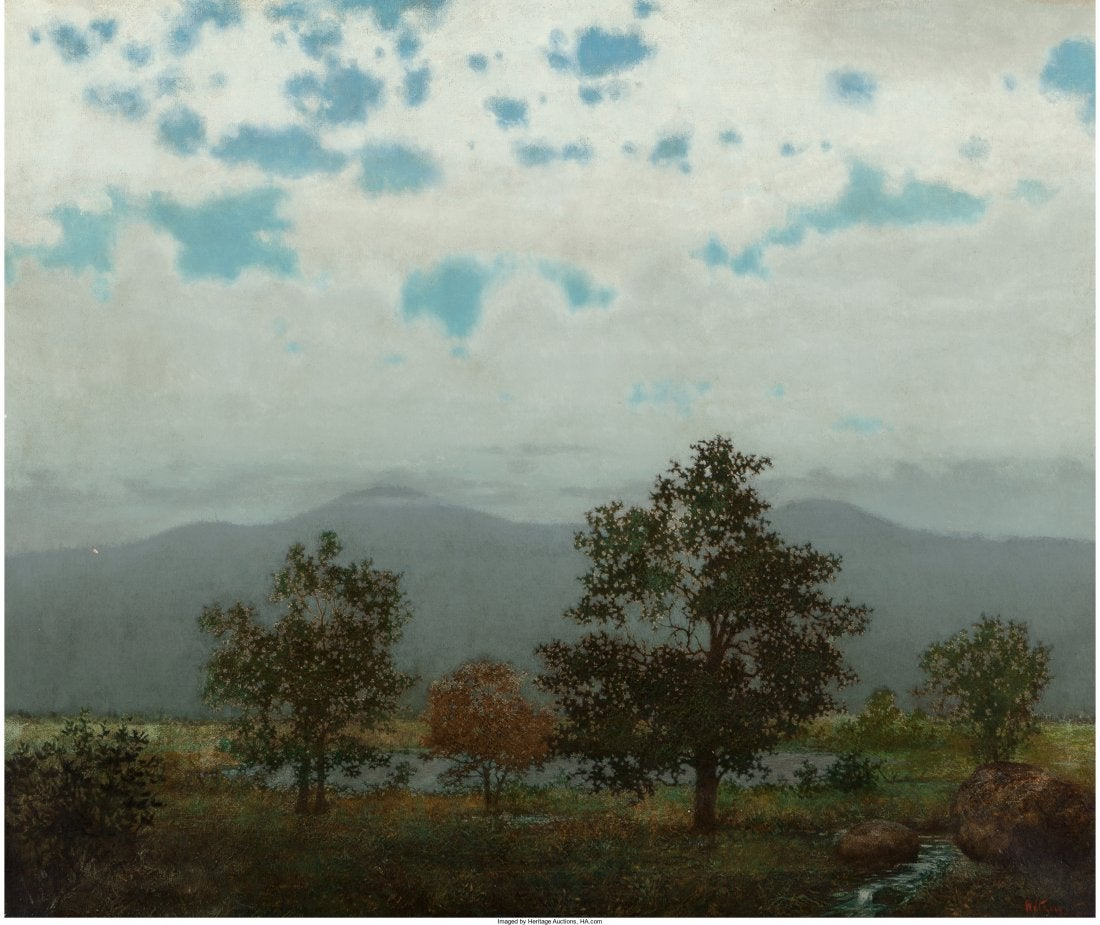
The Source, c. 1918–1923, private collection

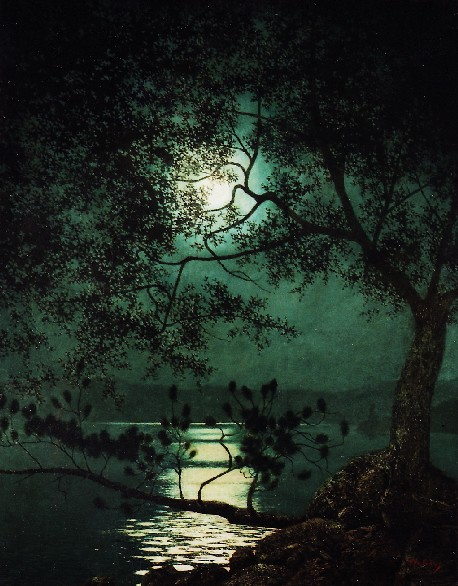
Fallen Pine at Hague, Lake George, c. 1918–1923

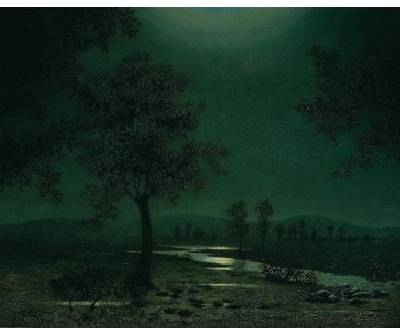
Mist and Moonlight, c. 1918–1923

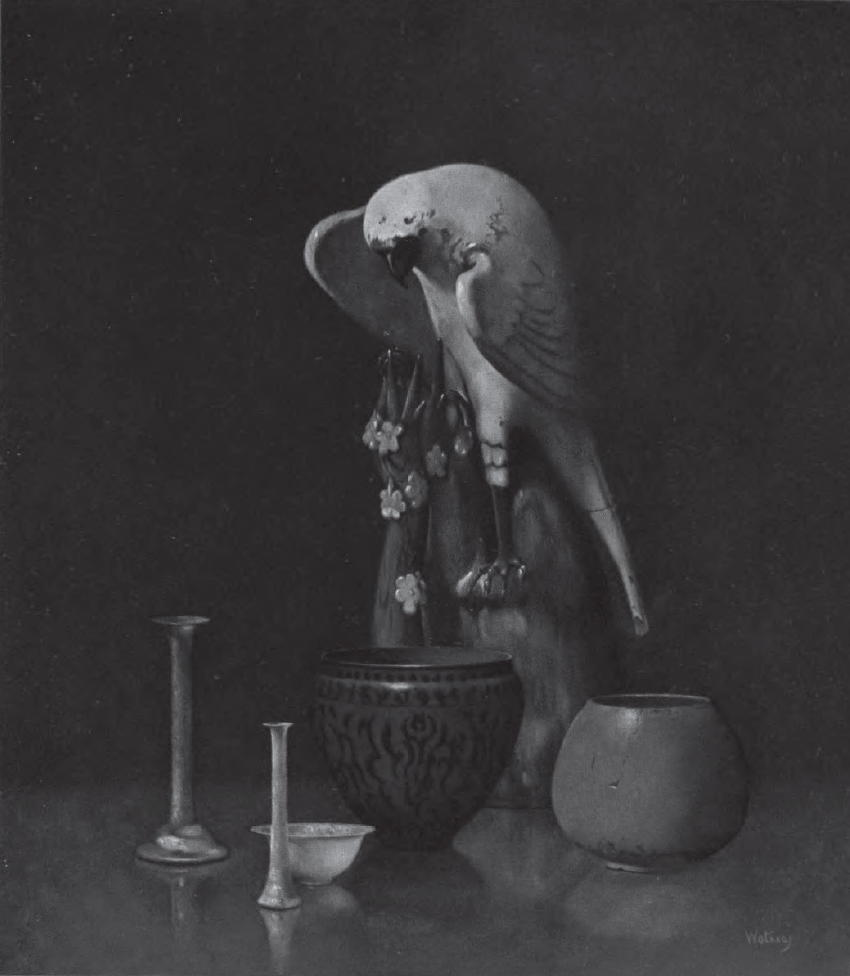
untitled still life, by 1923, location unknown

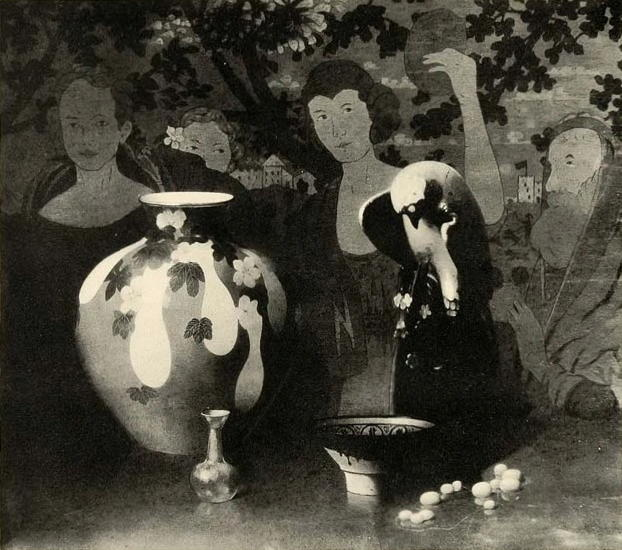
untitled still life, undated, location unknown

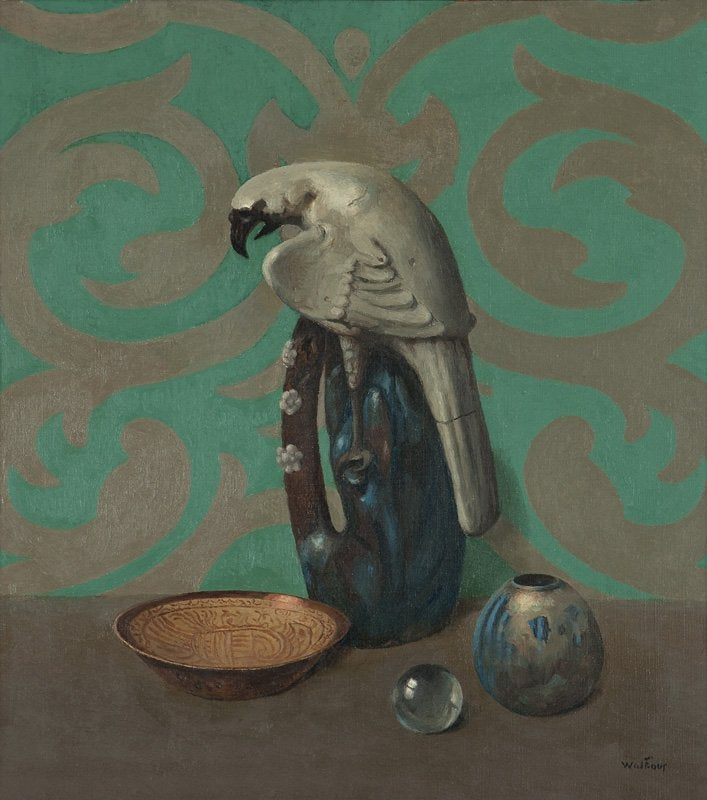
untitled still life, undated, private collection

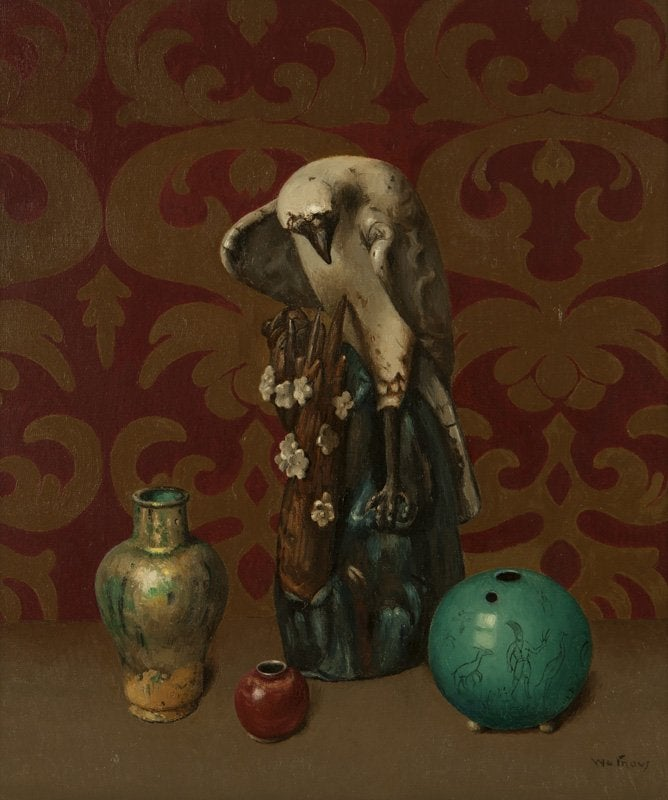
untitled still life, undated, private collection

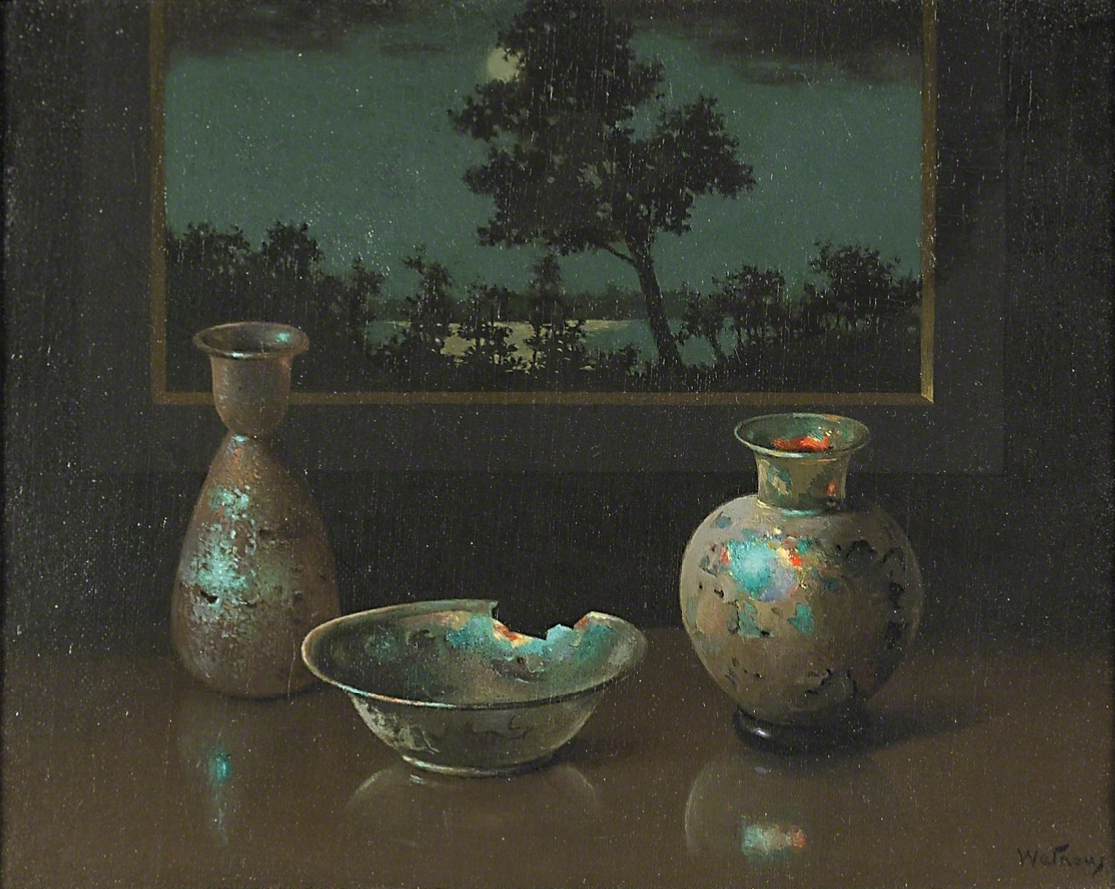
Syro-Roman Glass, c. 1925, private collection

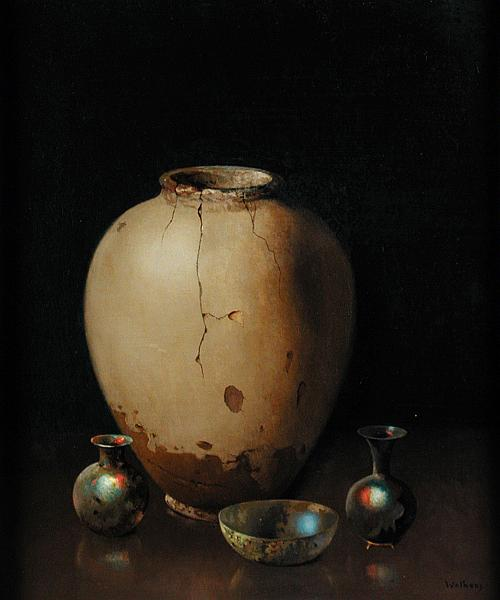
The Jar, undated, private collection

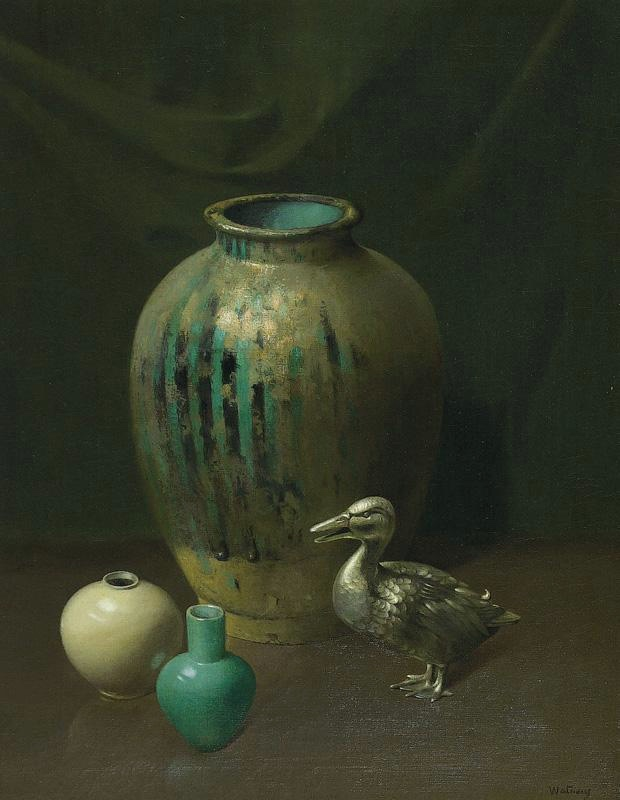
Still Life of Vases and Silver Duck, c. 1925, private collection

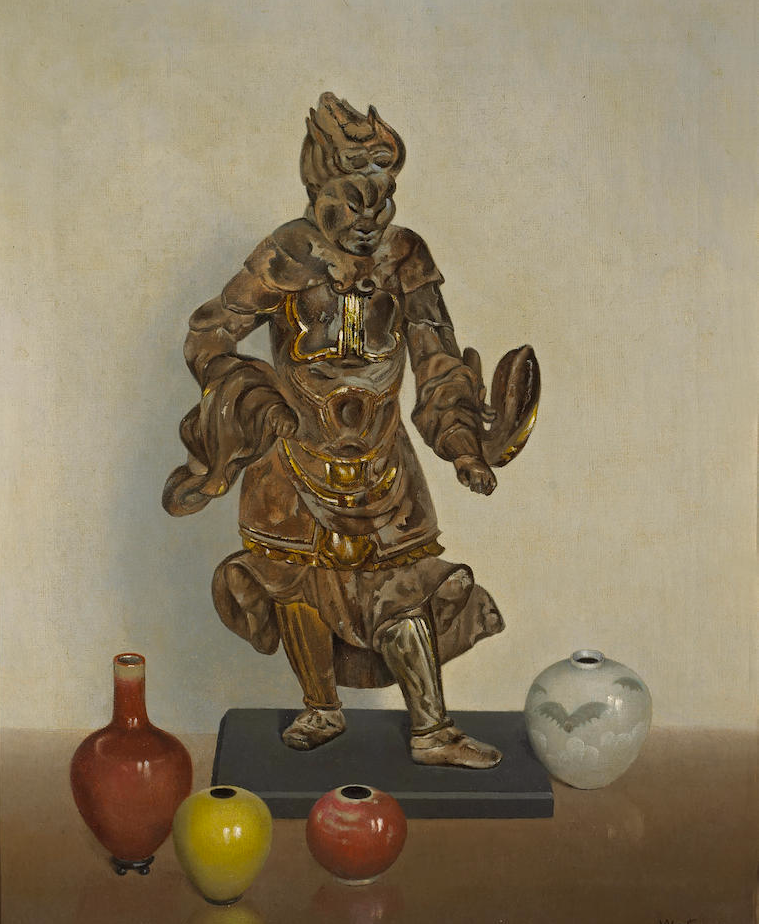
Still with Jars and Figurine, undated, private collection

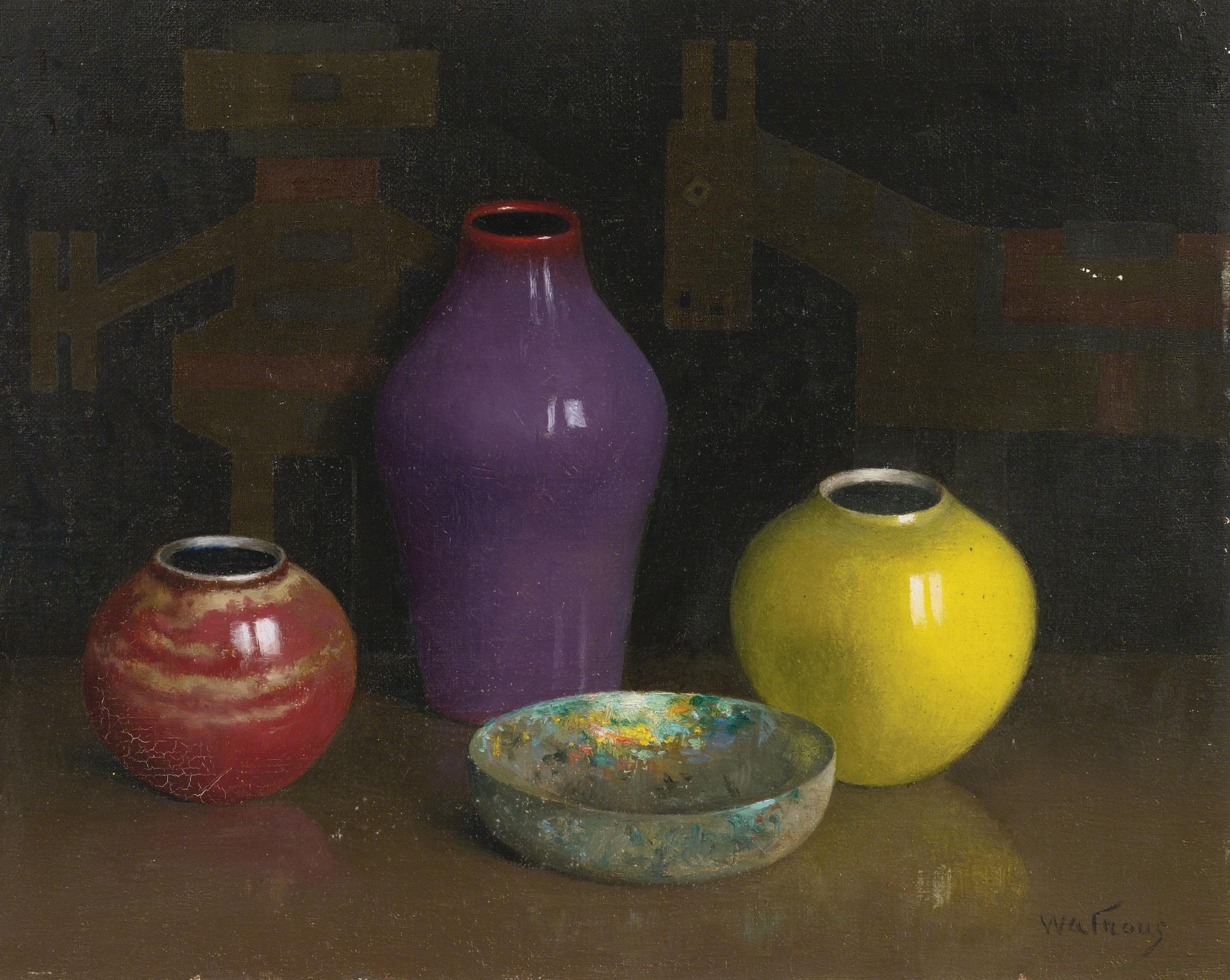
Still Life, undated, private collection

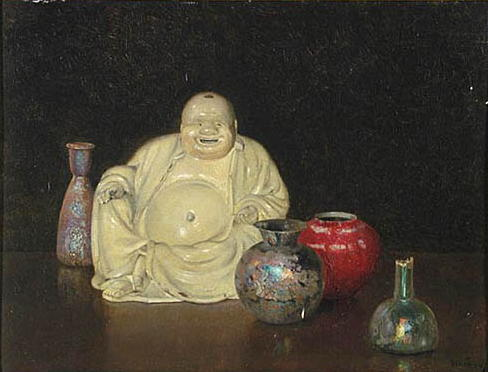
Buddha and Roman Glass, c. 1925, private collection

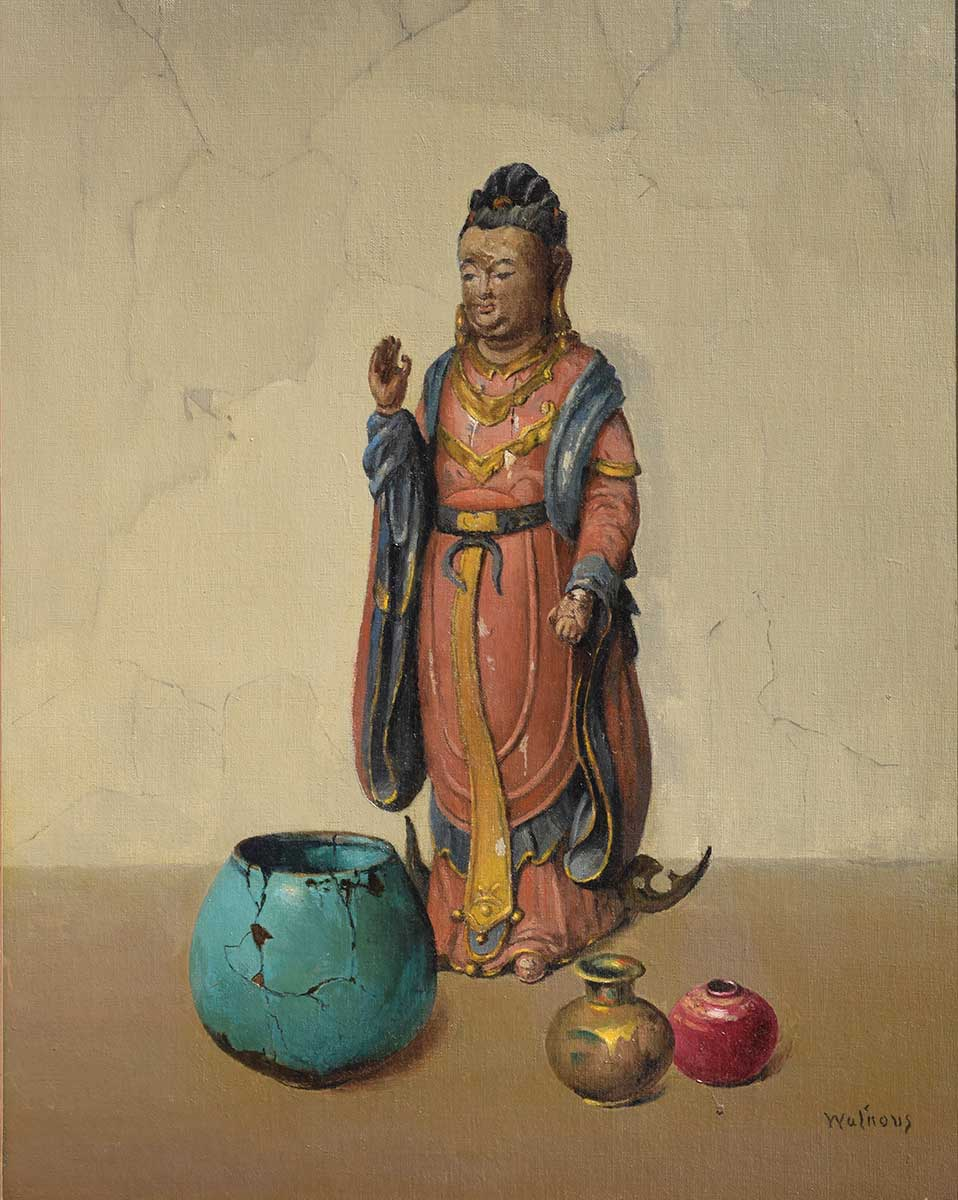
Buddha and Chinese Pottery, c. 1925, private collection

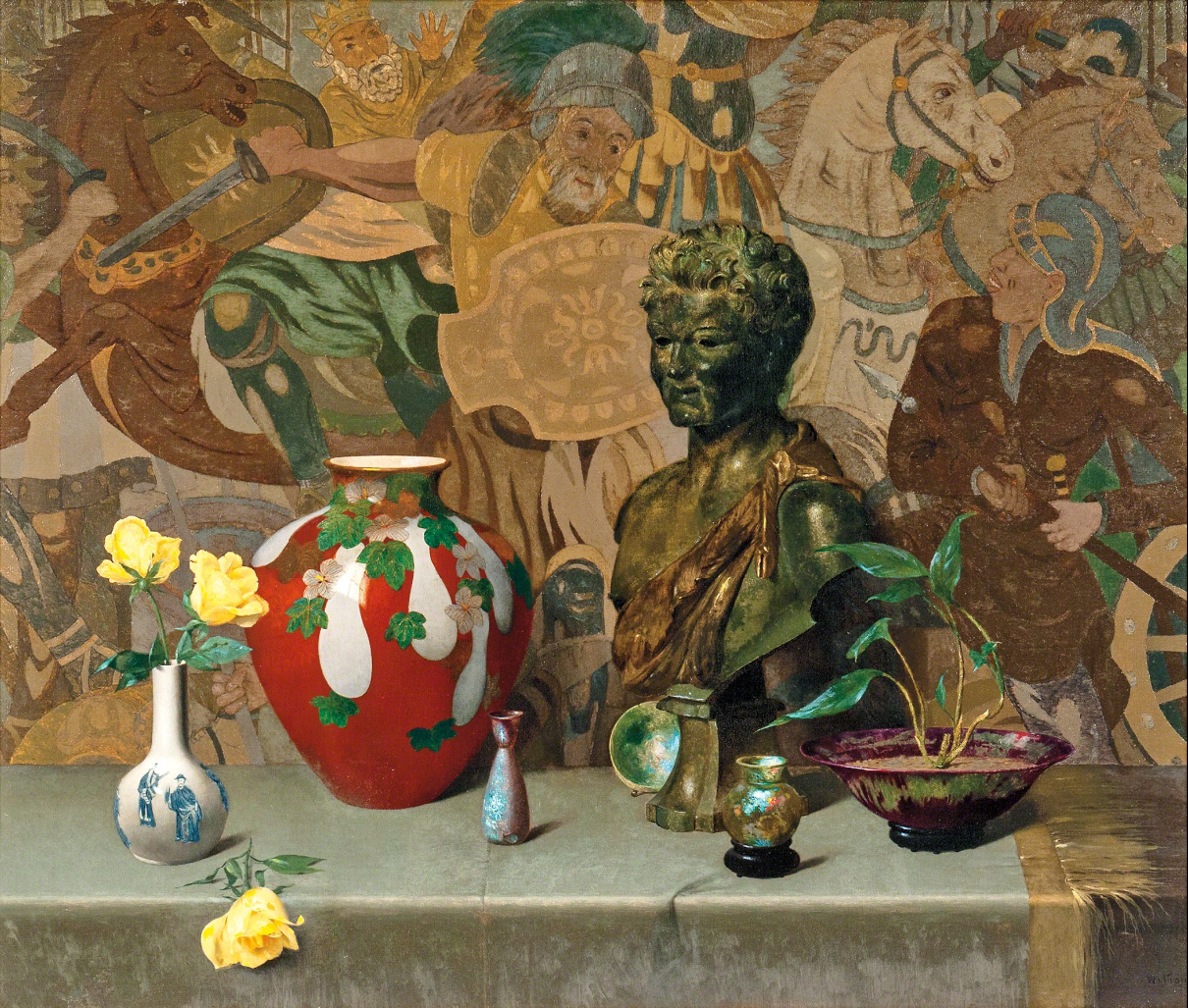
Still Life with Objets d'Art and Yellow Roses, c. 1925, private collection

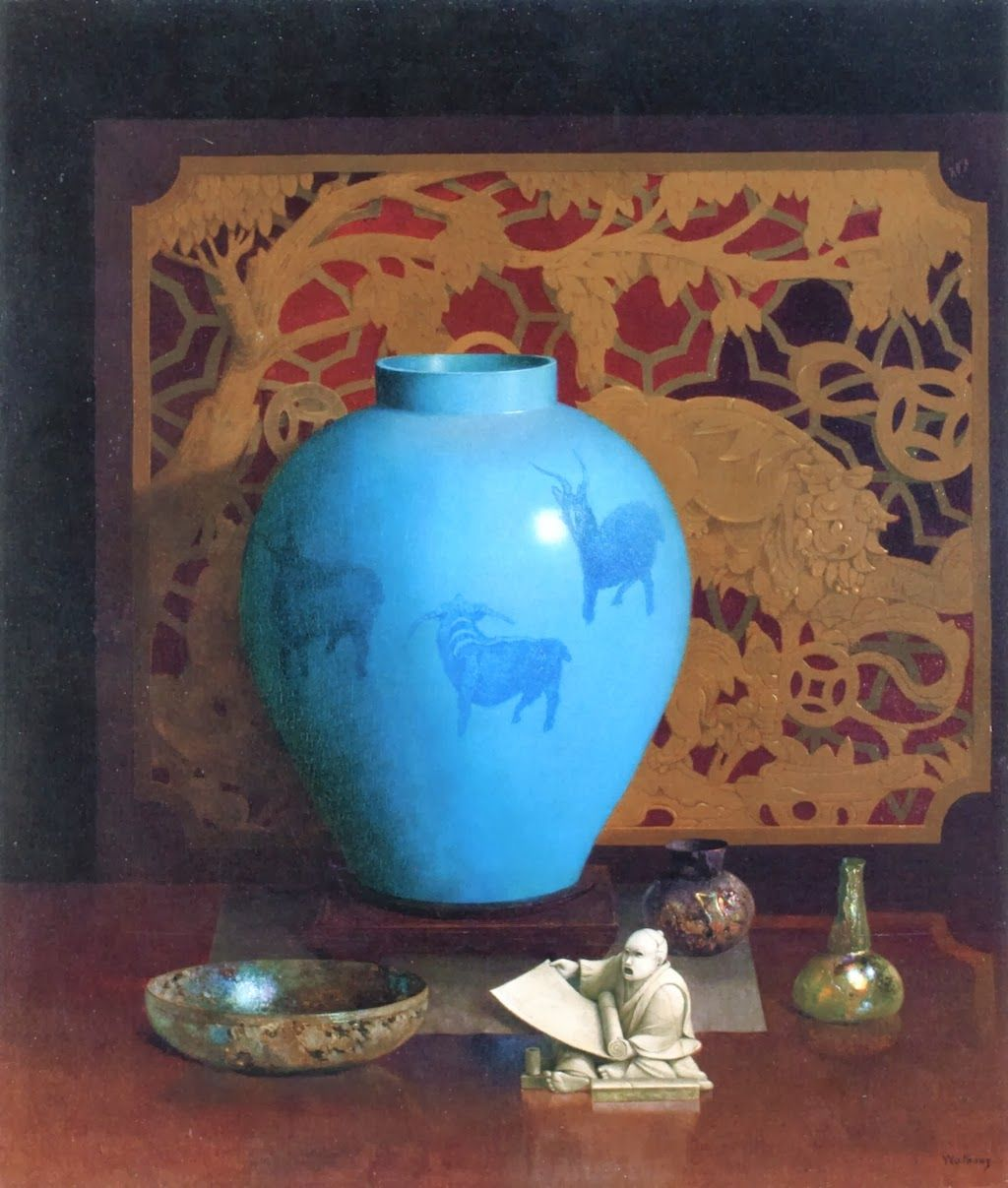
The Blue Goats, 1929, private collection

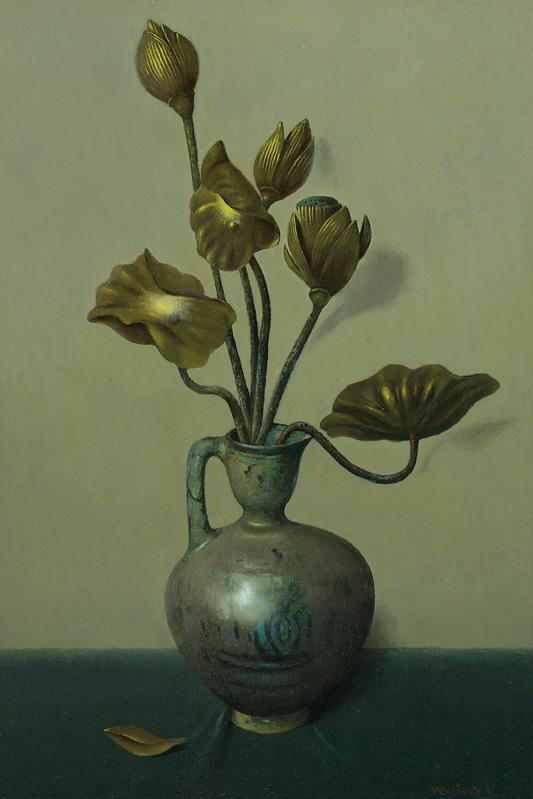
Still Live with Gilded Flowers, c. 1925–30, private collection

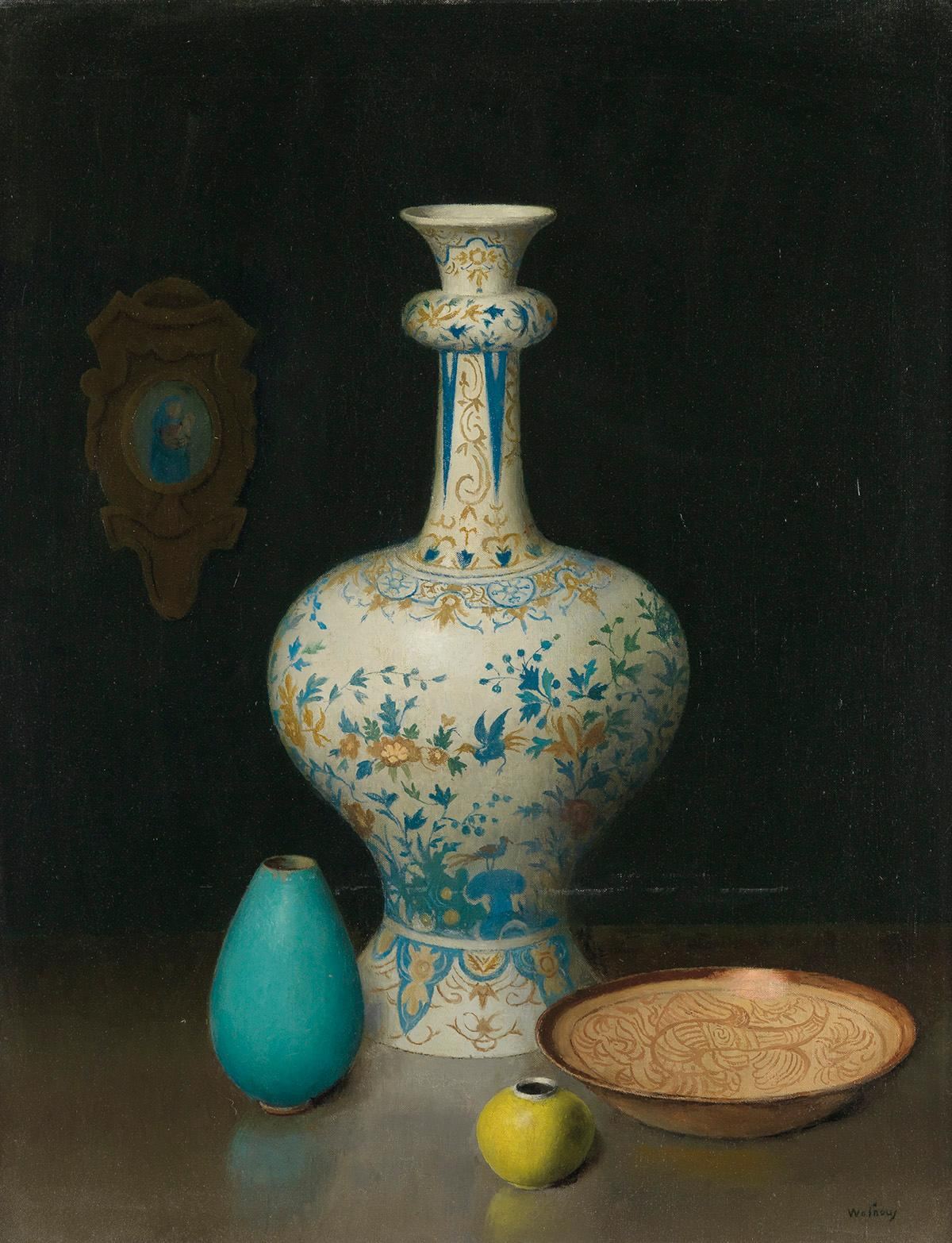
The Delft Vase, no date, private collection

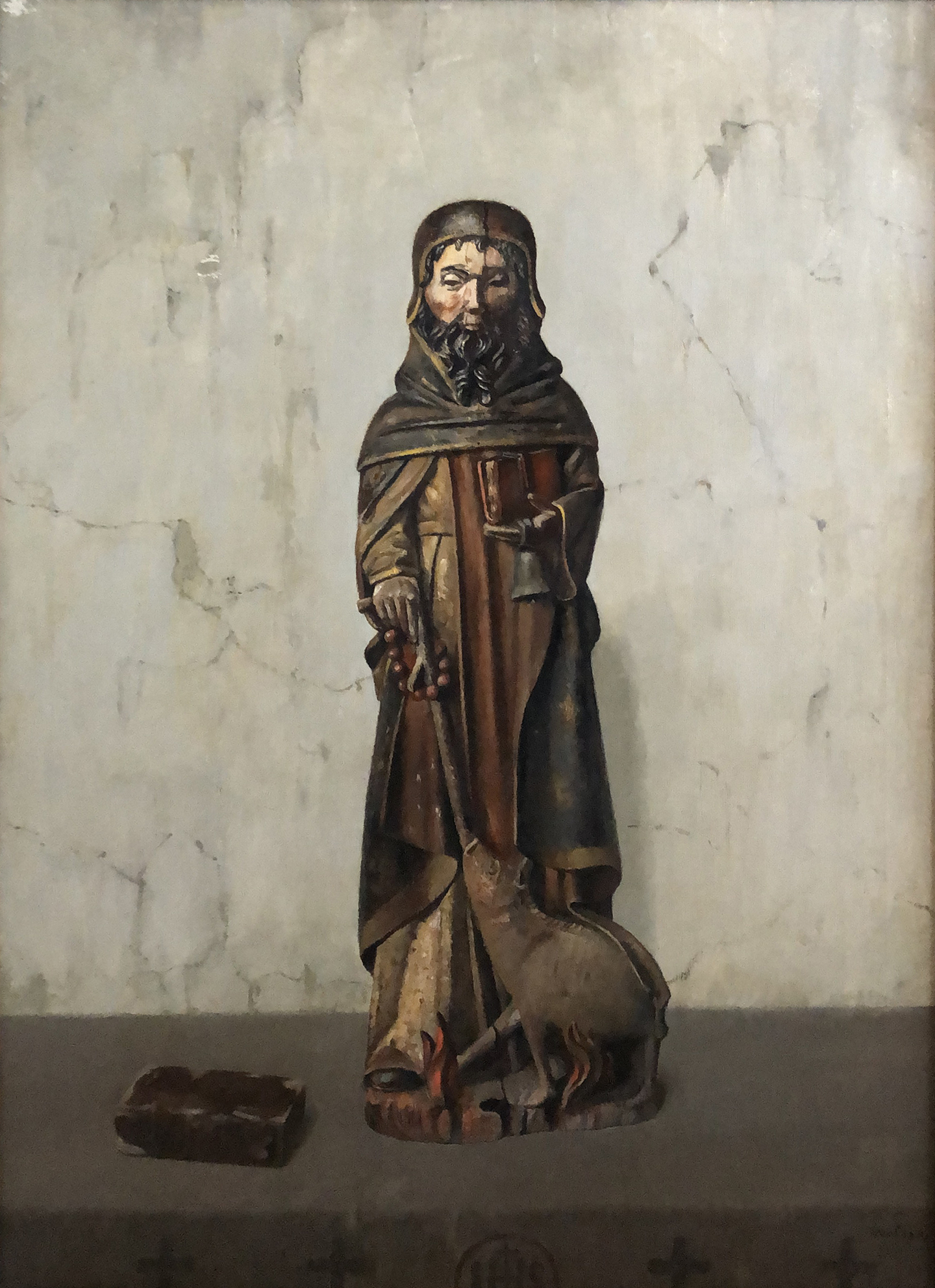
Still Life with St. Anthony Figurine, c. 1930, private collection

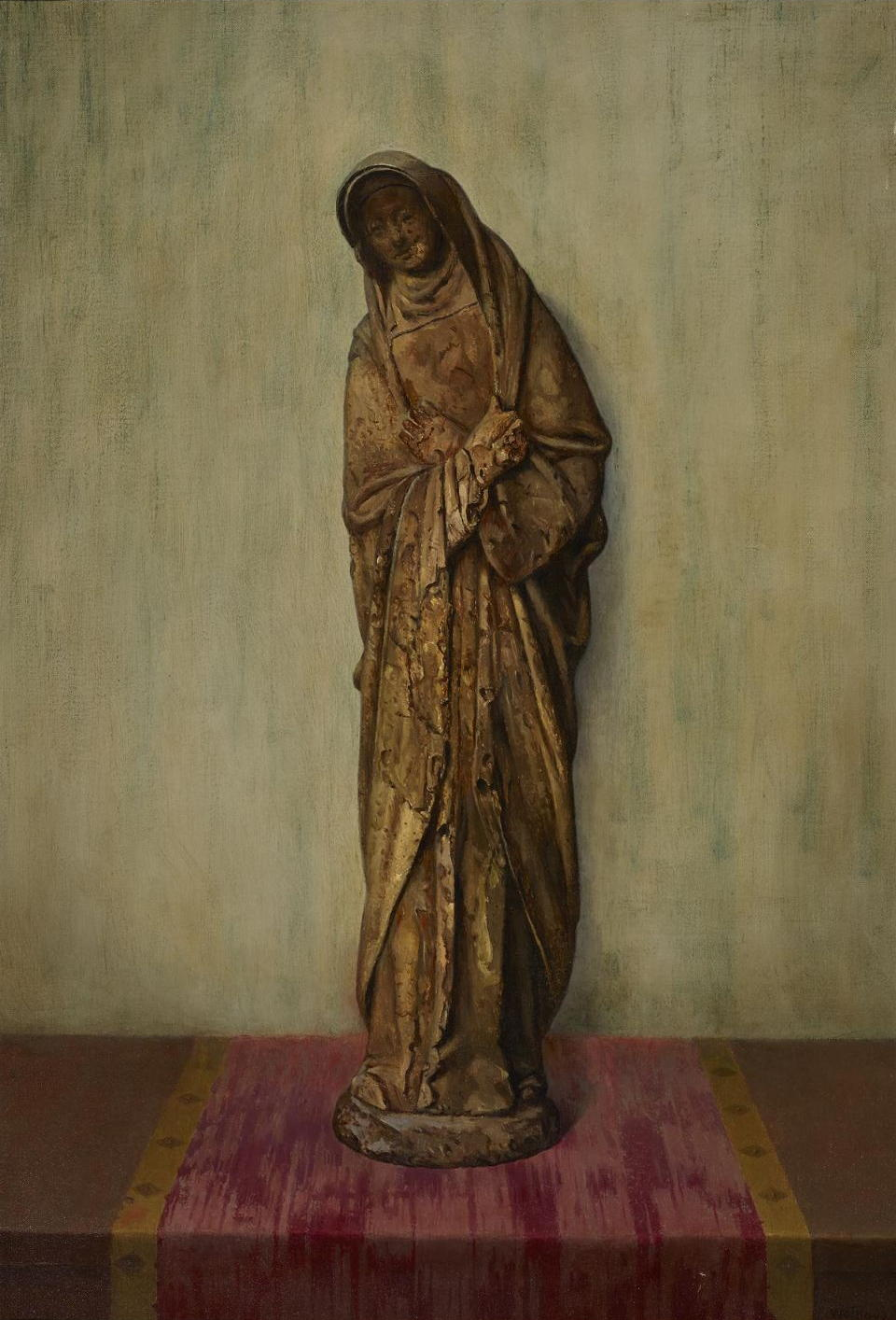
An Old Saint, c. 1930, private collection

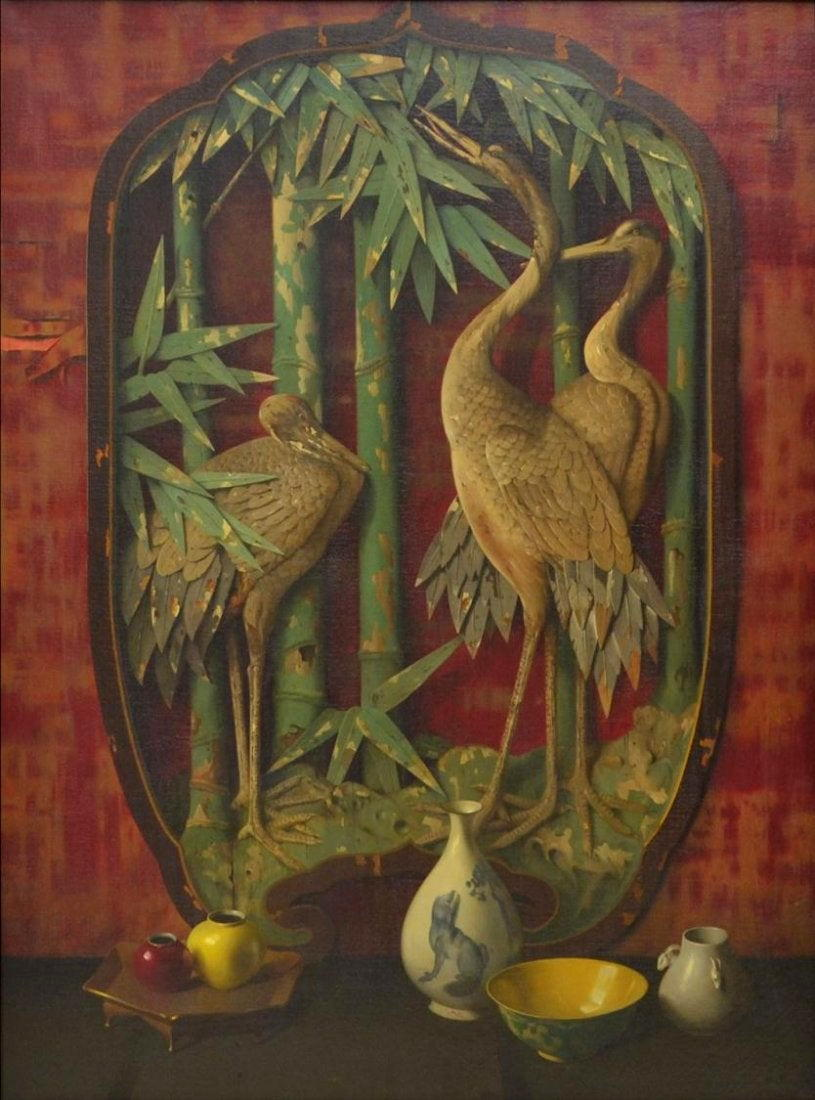
Three Cranes, 1931, private collection; the eponymous object is also seen in In the Artist's Studio

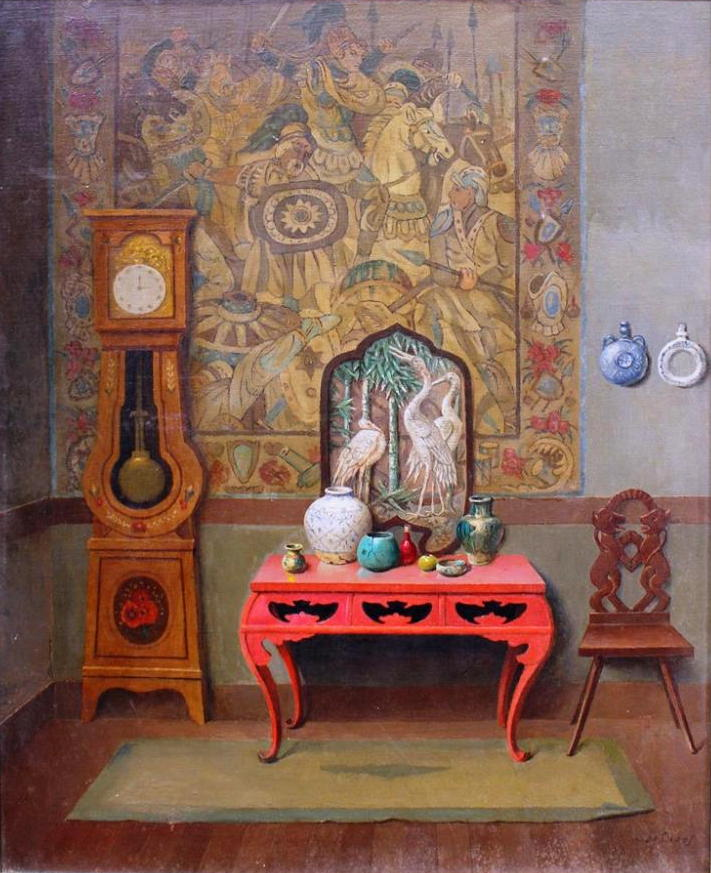
In the Artist's Studio, undated, private collection; objects include the eponymous subject of Three Cranes and the table seen in Solitaire

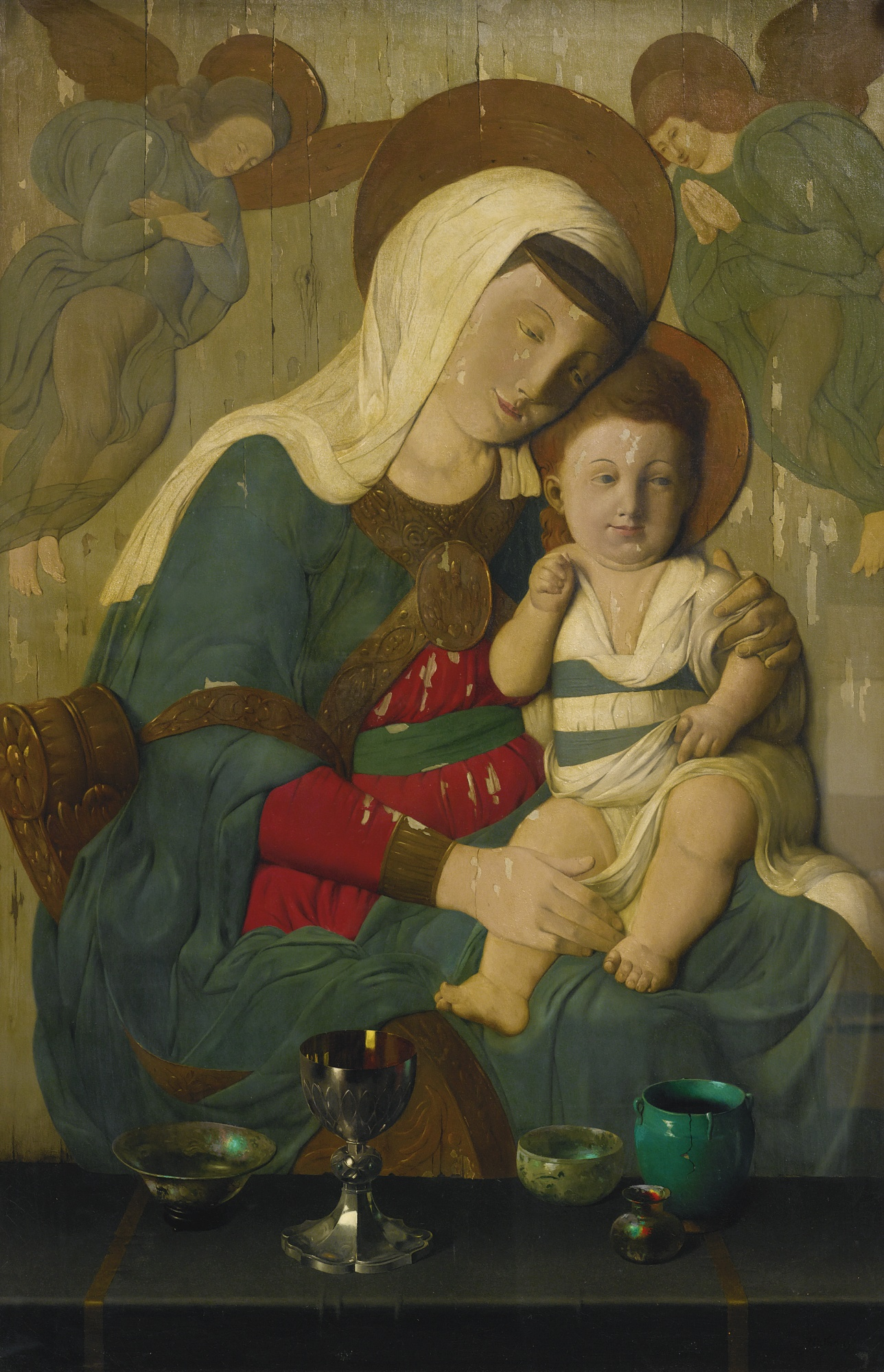
Madonna and Child, 1931, private collection

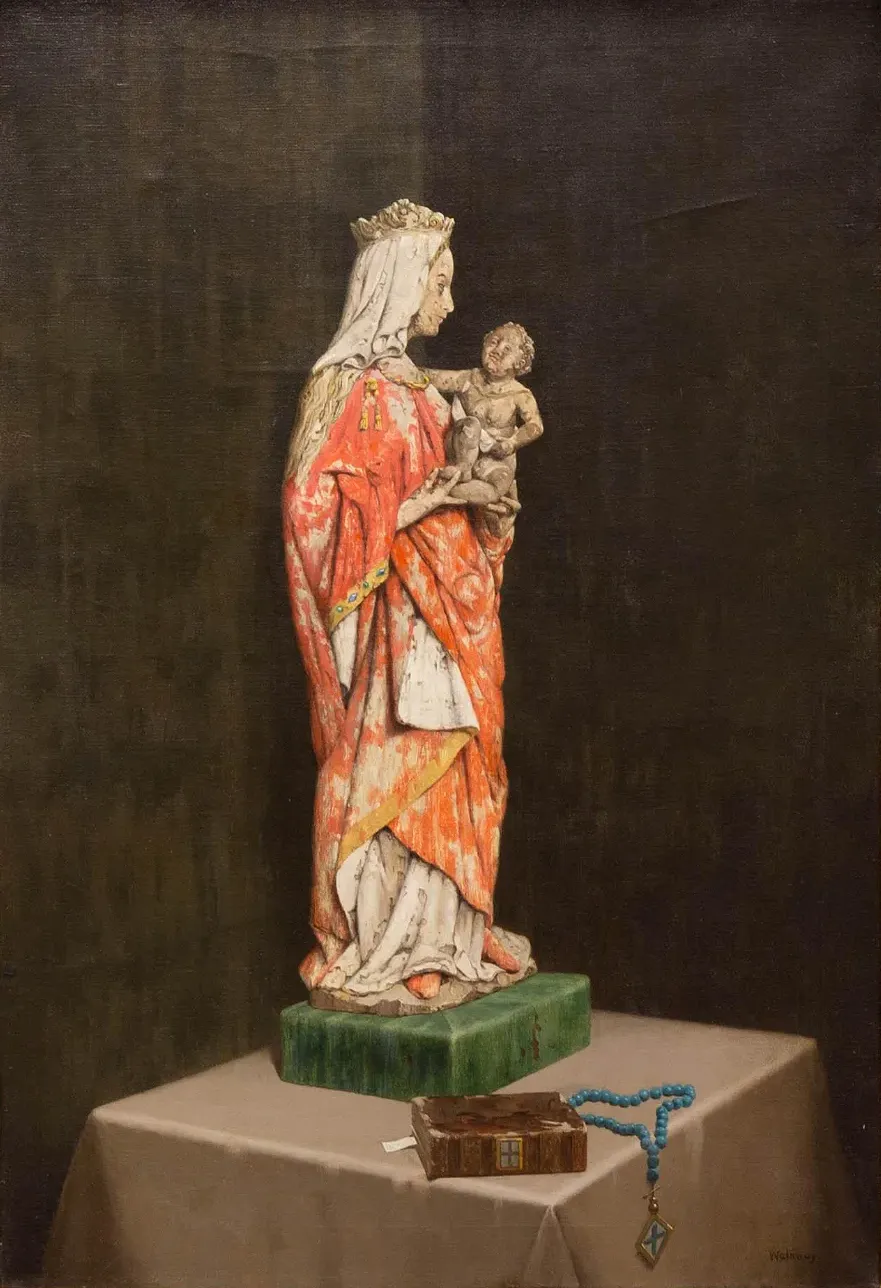
Rose Madonna, 1934, private collection

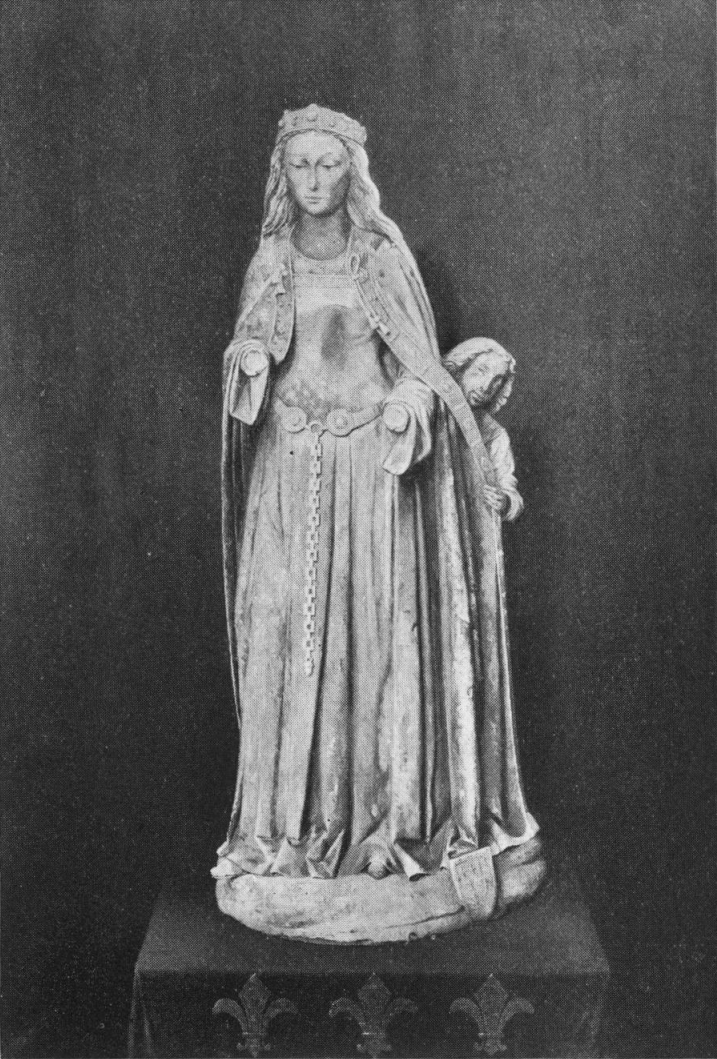
Marie de Bourgogne, 1935, location unknown

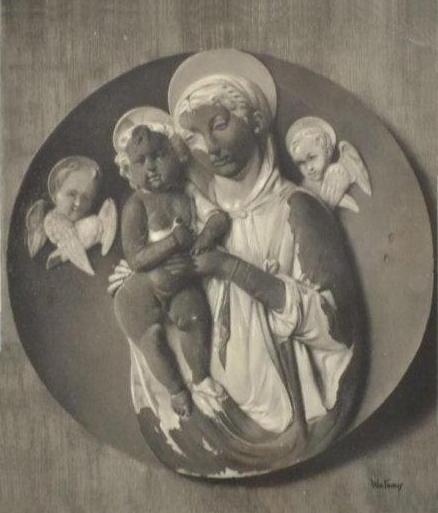
Madonna and Child with Two Putti, c. 1930–1935, location unknown

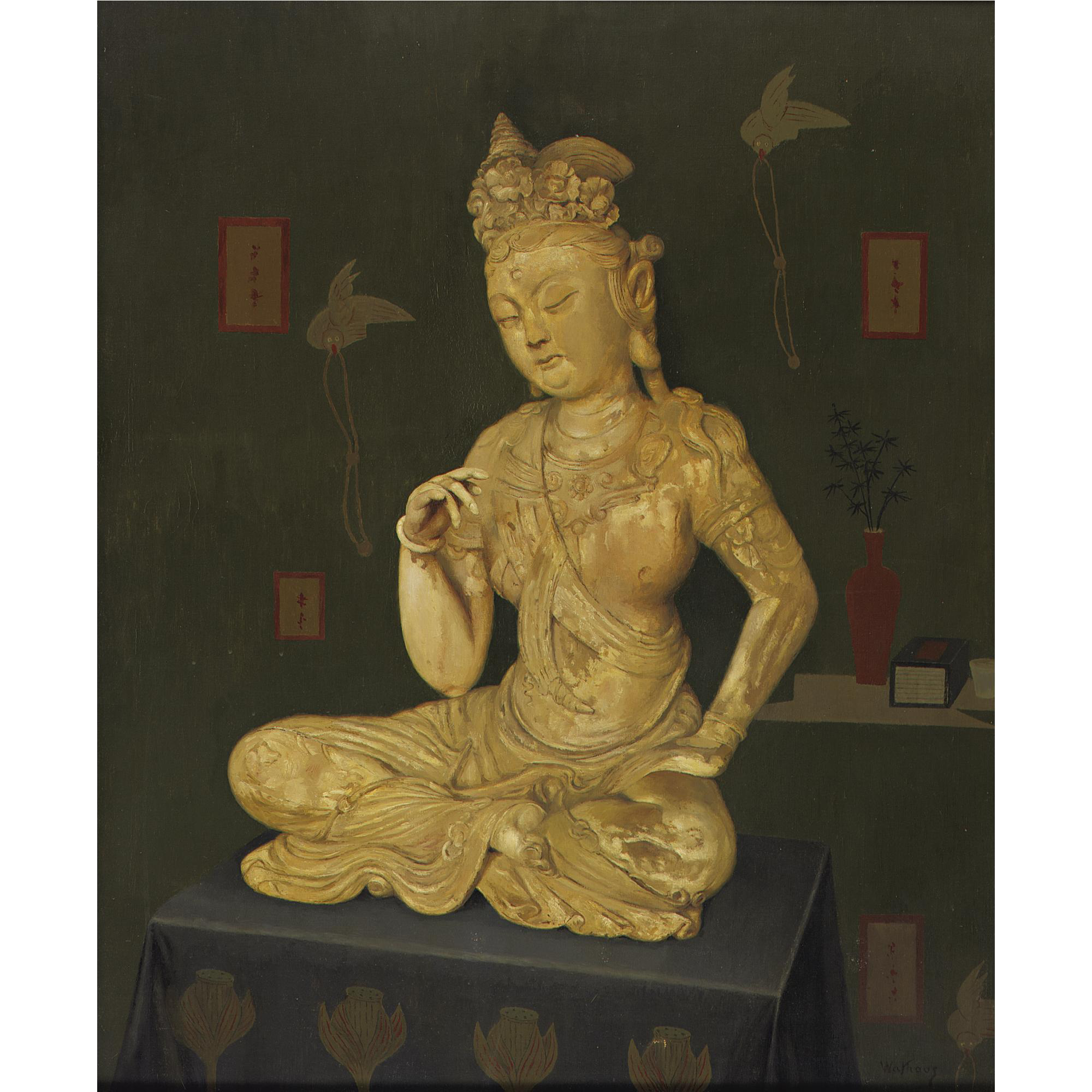
Kwan Yin, by 1936, private collection

== Gallery: depictions of Watrous ==
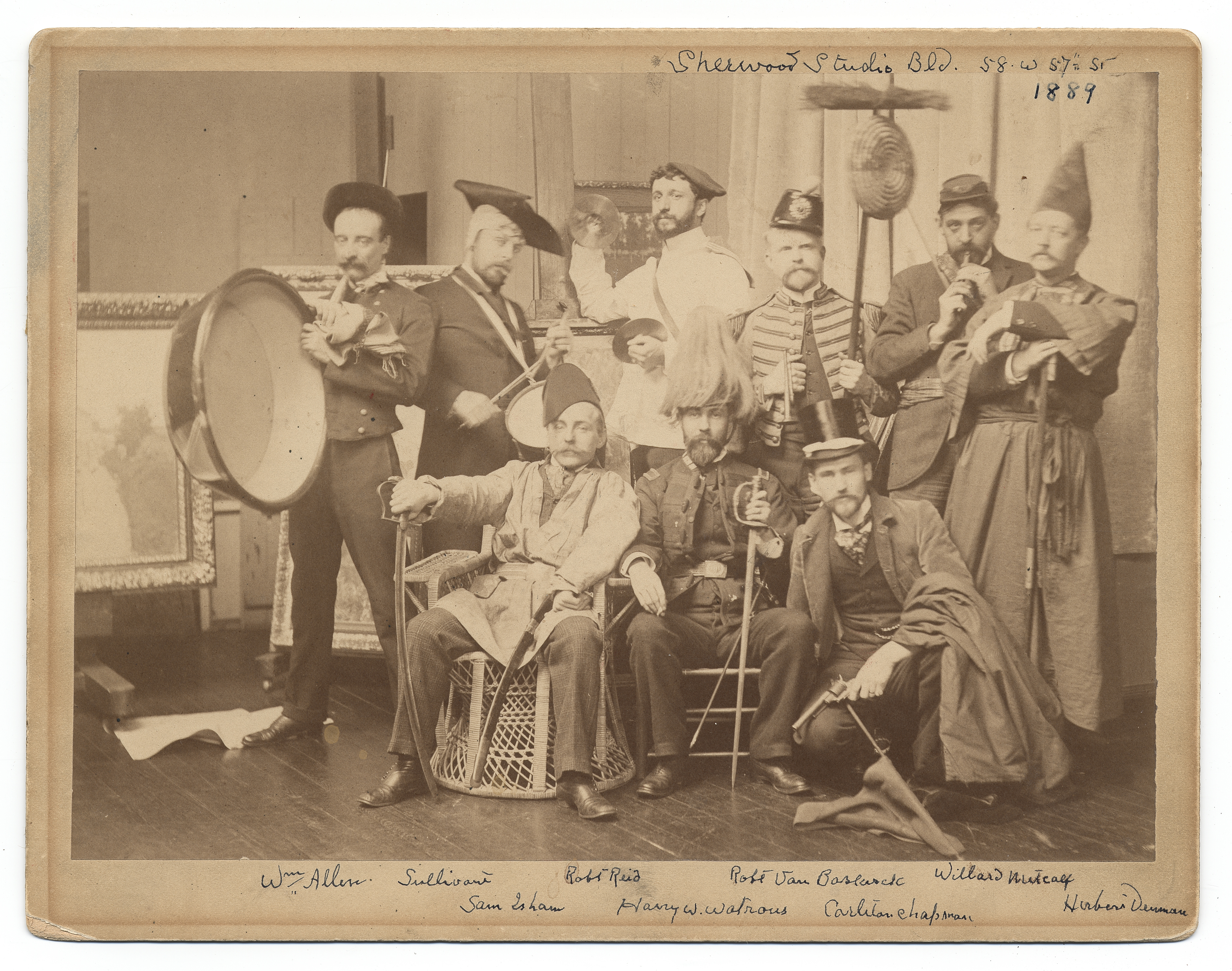
Artists in costume at the Sherwood Studio Building in New York, 1889. Watrous is seated at center.

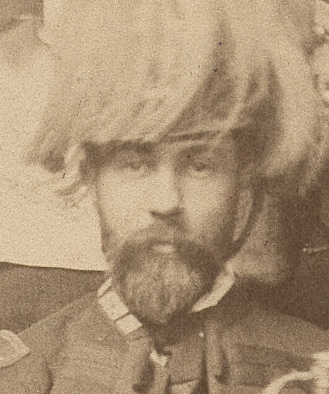
Detail from group photo in costumes at the Sherwood Studio Building, 1889.

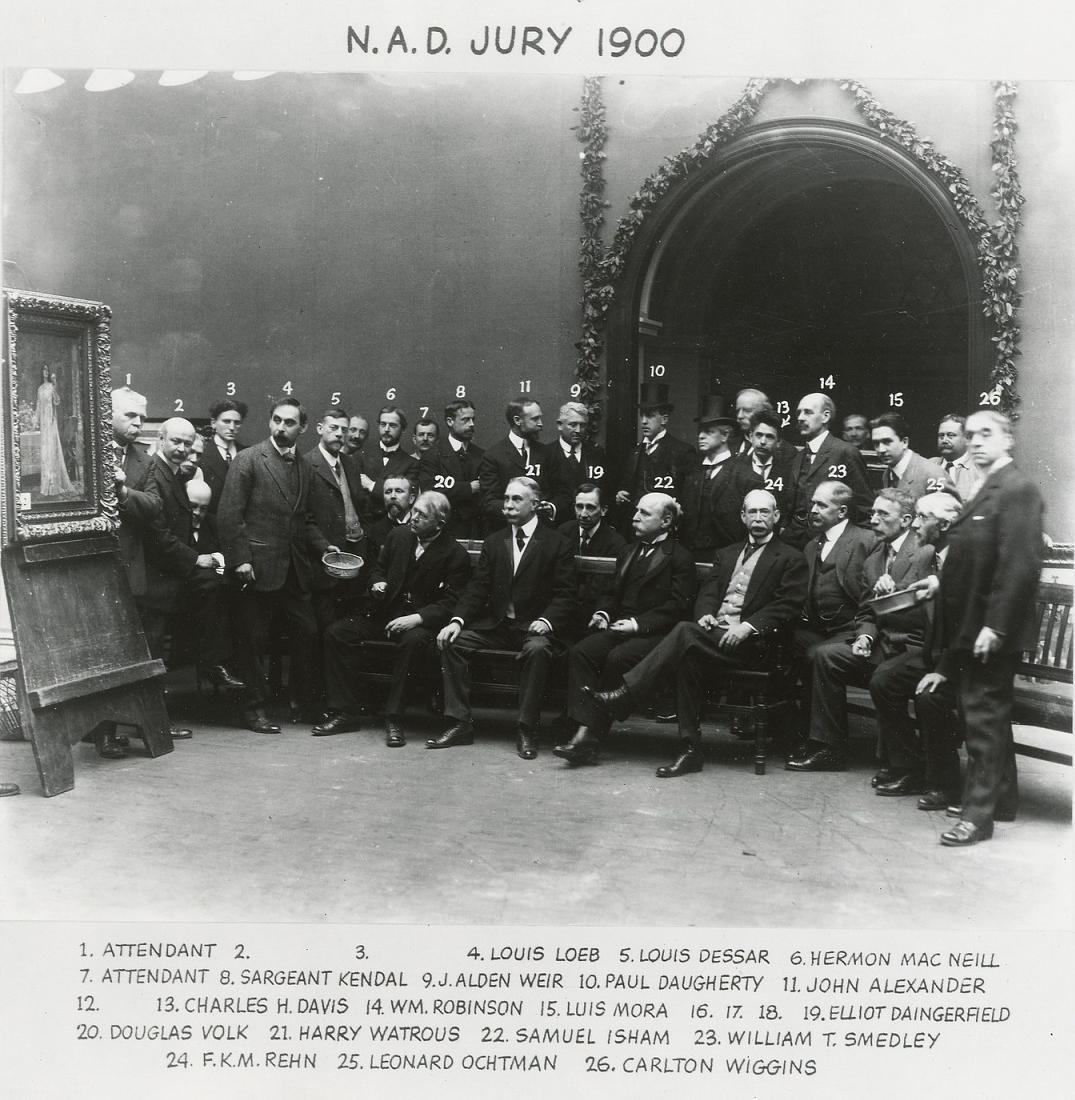
National Academy of Design jury, 1900. Watrous is #21.

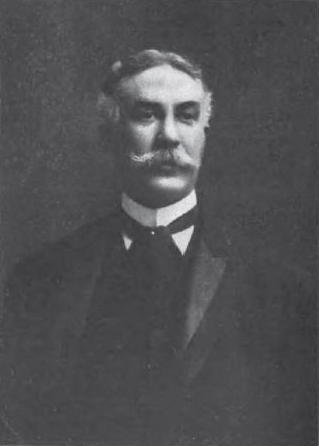
Harry Watrous, 1913.

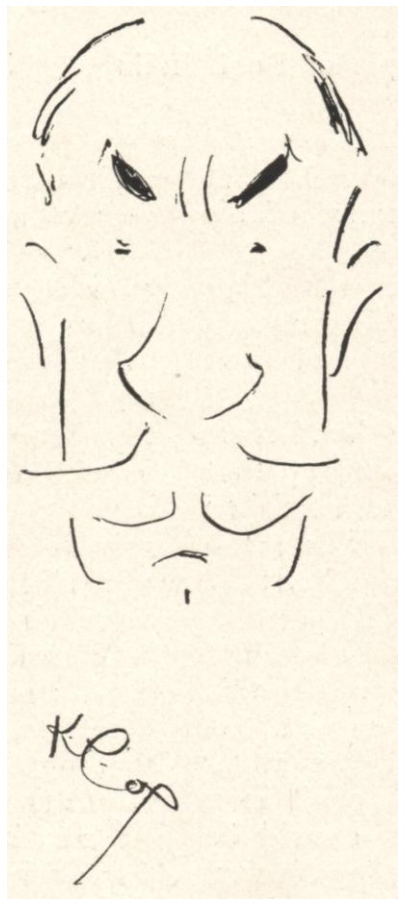
Caricature of Watrous, 1915.

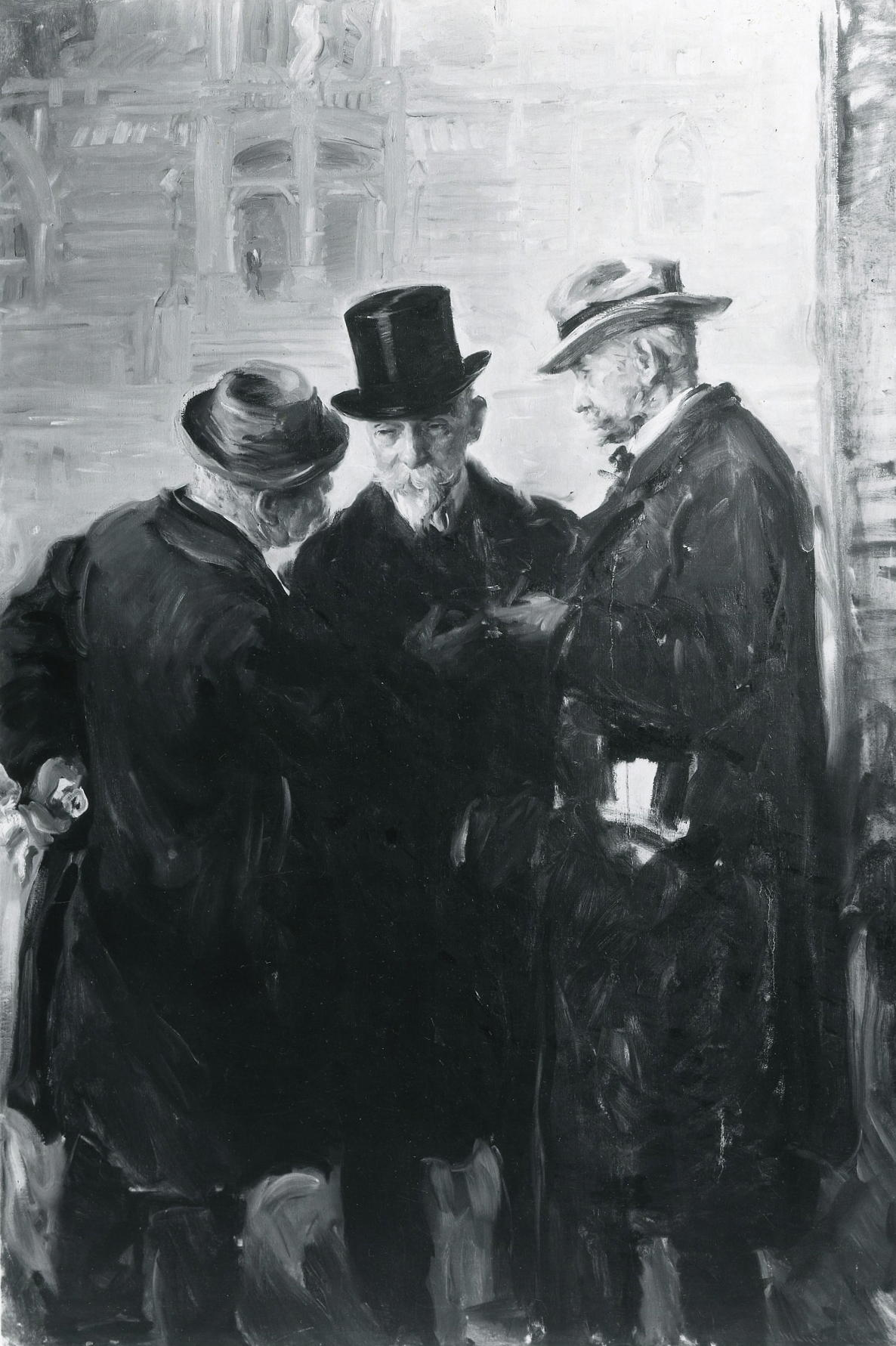
Wayman Elbridge Adams, The Conspiracy, 1919, showing Joseph Pennel, J. McClure Hamilton, and Harry Watrous.

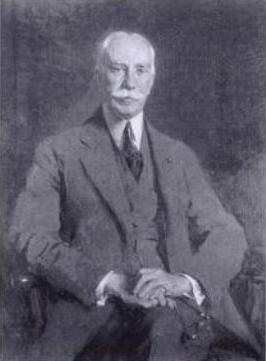
Ernest Ludwig Ipsen, portrait of Harry Watrous, 1927, Collection of the National Academy of Design.

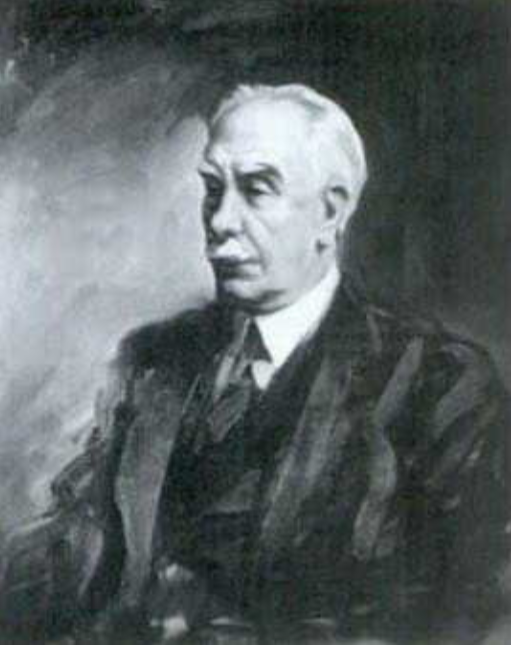
Sidney Edward Dickinson, portrait of Harry Watrous, 1930, Collection of the National Academy of Design.

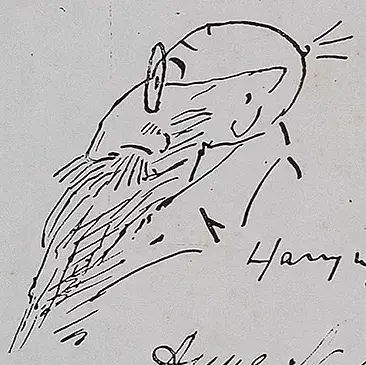
Caricature of Watrous by himself, 1931.
