= Arts in upstate New York =

This article brings together lists of artists, locations, artistic productions and movements associated with upstate New York.

== Literature ==
=== Writers ===
- Diana Abu-Jaber, memoirist of her Central New York childhood who has set two of her novels there.
- Chinua Achebe, the Nigerian writer, is a resident of Annandale-on-Hudson and has taught at Bard College since 1990.
- Laurie Halse Anderson, a Potsdam native and resident of Onondaga County, writes for children and young adults.
- John Ashbery, poet laureate of New York state from 2001 to 2003. Born on a farm near Lake Ontario and raised in Rochester, was a resident of Hudson
- Russell Banks, several of whose novels are set in Northern New York, who has served as New York State Author
- L. Frank Baum, author of The Wonderful Wizard of Oz; resident of Chittenango
- T. Coraghessan Boyle, who grew up in the Hudson Valley and who attended college in the North Country, which he describes as the "frozen skullcap of New York State"
- Walter R. Brooks, author of the 26-book Freddy the Pig series set in central New York. Born in Rome, NY, Brooks lived in Rochester, New York City, and lastly in Roxbury, NY.
- Ned Buntline, a pseudonym of Edward Zane Carroll Judson, the publisher, journalist, writer and publicist best known for his dime novels and the Colt Buntline Special he commissioned from Colt's Manufacturing Company. Edward Judson was born and died in Stamford.
- John Burroughs of Roxbury, a naturalist and essayist important in the evolution of the U.S. conservation movement. According to biographers at the American Memory project at the Library of Congress, John Burroughs was the most important practitioner after Thoreau of that especially American literary genre, the nature essay.
- Frederick Busch, who taught at Colgate University and whose characters are often Downstate New Yorkers transplanted upstate
- Hayden Carruth, poet, who taught at Syracuse University and lived in Munnsville
- Raymond Carver, who taught at Syracuse University
- Brock Clarke, who grew up in Little Falls, and who has set novels there and in Watertown.
- Lucille Clifton, poet, born in Depew. Though African-American, she grew up speaking Polish as well as English in the neighborhood.
- James Fenimore Cooper, who wrote The Last of the Mohicans in Warrensburg, and who spent the last years of his life in Cooperstown
- Robert White Creeley, professor of poetry at the State University of New York at Buffalo, and New York State Poet from 1989 to 1991
- Leslie Daniels, who wrote the novel Cleaning Nabokov's House
- William D. Danko, of Albany, author of The Millionaire Next Door
- Lydia Davis, a contemporary American author and translator of French, who teaches at SUNY Albany.
- Walter D. Edmonds, born in Boonville, author of "Drums Along the Mohawk" and the Erie Canal novel "Rome Haul."
- Frederick Exley, from the Watertown area
- Harold Frederic, from Utica, set his novels in 19th-Century upstate New York.
- Tess Gallagher, who taught at Syracuse University
- John Gardner, Batavia native and SUNY Binghamton professor
- Tim Green, who grew up in Liverpool and who was a student at Syracuse University of Raymond Carver and Tobias Wolff
- Washington Irving, resident of Tarrytown, who is buried in Sleepy Hollow
- Mary Jemison, the "White Woman of the Genesee," whose story was told in J. E. Seaver's classic captivity narrative "Narrative of the Life of Mrs. Mary Jemison" (1824; latest ed. 1967)
- William J. Kennedy, the Bard of Albany
- Maurice Kenny, Mohawk poet from Saranac Lake
- James Howard Kunstler, resident of Saratoga Springs
- Alison Lurie, resident of Ithaca
- Bill McKibben, longtime resident of the Keene Valley in the Adirondacks
- Herman Melville, resident of Albany and graduate of the Lansingburgh Academy, who began writing his first novels in Lansingburgh
- Lorrie Moore, whose novel "Who Will Run the Frog Hospital?" is set in the Lake George area
- Howard Frank Mosher, usually associated with the Northeast Kingdom of Vermont, but who grew up in Cato and who has written about the North Country
- William Henry Harrison Murray, known as "Adirondack Murray"
- Vladimir Nabokov, resident of Ithaca
- Solomon Northup of Saratoga Springs, who published an account of his abduction and ordeal entitled "Twelve Years a Slave" in 1853. The book was written with the help of David Wilson, a local writer. Published when the novel Uncle Tom's Cabin was a bestseller, Northup's book sold 30,000 copies within three years.
- Joyce Carol Oates, born in Lockport
- Camille Anna Paglia, born in Endicott
- David Pietrusza, born in Amsterdam
- Daniel Pinkwater, resident of the Hudson Valley
- Connie Porter, grew up in Lackawanna
- Richard Russo, from Johnstown and Gloversville, many of whose novels are set in the Mohawk Valley
- Edna St. Vincent Millay, resident of Austerlitz
- George Saunders, who teaches at Syracuse University
- Delmore Schwartz, poet, Syracuse University professor and mentor to Lou Reed
- W. D. Snodgrass of Erieville
- Sparrow, poet, resident of Phoenicia
- Julia Spencer-Fleming, native of Plattsburgh and resident of Argyle and Liverpool, whose books are set in the Adirondacks
- Dana Spiotta of Syracuse and Cherry Valley, whose novel Eat the Document is set in part in Little Falls.
- Wendy Corsi Staub, born and raised in Dunkirk and Fredonia, New York Times bestselling author
- Sandra Steingraber, an American biologist and author in the tradition of Rachel Carson, who lives in Trumansburg.
- Trevanian, born in Granville
- Mark Twain, resident of Elmira and Buffalo
- Kurt Vonnegut, who began his literary career in Schenectady while working for General Electric in the early 1950s, and who set some of his novels in "Ilium," a fictionalized Schenectady
- John A. Williams of Syracuse, novelist of the black experience in white America.
- Edmund Wilson, summer resident of Talcottville and author of "Upstate: Records and Recollections of Northern New York." New York: Farrar, Straus & Giroux, 1971; reprint, Syracuse: Syracuse University Press, 1990 and "Apologies to the Iroquois." New York: Farrar, Straus & Cudahy, 1960; reprint, paper, Syracuse: Syracuse University Press, 1992
- Tobias Wolff, who taught at Syracuse University

=== Venues ===
- Millay Colony for the Arts, residency program for writers, composers and visual artists
- Yaddo, an artists' community in Saratoga Springs.

== Music ==
=== Musicians ===
- Harold Arlen, native of Buffalo, composer of popular song including "Over the Rainbow"
- Melissa Auf der Maur, Montrealer and former bassiste of Hole and The Smashing Pumpkins, now lives in "a small town in upstate New York"
- Carla Bley, resident of Willow, near Woodstock.
- Joe Bonamassa, born in Utica
- Fran Cosmo of the band Boston, resident of upstate New York
- Elizabeth Cotten, resident of Syracuse
- The late Chuck Cuminale, Rochester's Bodhisattva, aka Colorblind James of The Colorblind James Experience
- Blossom Dearie, jazz singer and pianist, who grew up in East Durham
- Ani DiFranco of Buffalo
- Ronnie James Dio, raised in Cortland
- Donna The Buffalo of Trumansburg
- Ray Evans, songwriter and native of Salamanca
- Renée Fleming, soprano, who grew up in Rochester, studied at the Crane School of Music at the State University of New York at Potsdam, the University of Rochester's Eastman School of Music and Juilliard.
- Jackson C. Frank, folksinger, who grew up in Cheektowaga and later lived in Woodstock
- Greg Graffin, vocalist of Bad Religion who is a resident of upstate New York
- Lou Gramm, of Foreigner, from Rochester
- Son House, resident of Rochester
- Rick James, born in Buffalo
- Gary Lewis of Gary Lewis & The Playboys, although a Californian, now makes his home in Henrietta
- Riki Lindhome of Portville, member of Garfunkel and Oates
- John Lombardo of Buffalo, former founding member of 10,000 Maniacs and member of folk duo John & Mary
- the song "Low Bridge, Everybody Down", also known as "Fifteen Years on the Erie Canal" or "Fifteen Miles on the Erie Canal", by Thomas S. Allen
- Lydia Lunch, born in Rochester
- Teo Macero, producer of the Miles Davis album, Kind of Blue, from Glens Falls
- Chuck Mangione of Rochester
- Gap Mangione of Rochester
- Natalie Merchant of Jamestown
- Mitch Miller, born in Rochester, a graduate of the Eastman School of Music
- Chauncey Olcott, songwriter of "My Wild Irish Rose" and "When Irish Eyes are Smiling"
- Steve Perry, lead singer of the Cherry Poppin' Daddies, born in Syracuse and raised in Apalachin
- Kristen Pfaff of Buffalo, first bassist of Hole
- Mary Ramsey of Buffalo, lead singer of 10,000 Maniacs and member of folk duo John & Mary
- Sigurd Raschèr of Shushan, one of the most important figures in the development of the 20th century repertoire for the concert saxophone.
- Pete Seeger, protest singer and environmental activist. Longtime resident of Fishkill, he co-founded the Hudson River Sloop Clearwater organization
- Colleen Sexton, from Syracuse
- Martin Sexton, from Syracuse
- Billy Sheehan, from Buffalo, bass guitarist and co-founder of the band Talas
- Joanne Shenandoah of the Oneida Nation
- Kim Simmonds of the British blues band Savoy Brown, now a resident of Oswego
- Alice Tully, opera singer and philanthropist, born in Corning
- Jimmy Van Heusen, songwriter, native of Syracuse, 1944 winner of an Academy Award for Best Original Song for "Swinging on a Star"
- Jerry Jeff Walker, born in Oneonta
- Alec Wilder, native of Rochester, composer
- Gary Wilson, native of Endicott, experimental musician
- Thomasina Winslow, born New Baltimore, resident of the Albany area
- Tom Winslow of New Baltimore

=== Bands and groups ===
- 10,000 Maniacs of Jamestown
- Blotto, a new wave band from Albany
- Brand New Sin, a hard rock band from Syracuse
- The Burns Sisters of Ithaca
- Cannibal Corpse, a death metal band originally from Buffalo
- Every Time I Die from Buffalo
- Gym Class Heroes from Geneva
- Goo Goo Dolls, from Buffalo
- Honor Bright, pop-punk band from Syracuse
- The Horse Flies of Trumansburg
- Joywave from Rochester
- Manowar from Auburn
- The Modernaires, from Buffalo
- moe. from Buffalo
- Old Crow Medicine Show, originally formed around Trumansburg and Ithaca
- Ra Ra Riot, an indie rock band from Syracuse
- Soulive from Woodstock
- Spyro Gyra of Buffalo
- State Champs, a pop punk band from Albany
- X Ambassadors from Ithaca

=== Festivals ===
- Finger Lakes GrassRoots Festival of Music and Dance
- The Great Blue Heron Music Festival of Sherman
- Summer Jam at Watkins Glen, 1973
- Woodstock Music Festival
- Yasgur Road Reunion, Yearly Woodstock Reunion festival at Yasgur's Farm in Bethel, NY

=== Venues ===
- Caffe Lena of Saratoga Springs, the oldest continuously operating coffee house in North America, founded by Lena Spencer

== Fine arts ==
=== Artists ===
- Milton Avery, born in Altmar, buried in Woodstock
- George Bellows – painter
- Jake Berthot
- Ralph Albert Blakelock
- Arnold Blanch – painter
- Lucile Blanch - painter
- Francis Bicknell Carpenter (1830–1900), an American painter born in Homer. Carpenter is best known for his painting First Reading of the Emancipation Proclamation of President Lincoln, which is hanging in the United States Capitol.
- Wendell Castle (*1932), Rochester, furniture artist
- Frederic Church
- Thomas Cole (1801–1848), painter regarded as the founder of the Hudson River School
- Arthur Bowen Davies, born in Utica, a principal organizer of the 1913 Armory Show and a member of The Eight, a group of painters including five associated with the Ashcan School
- Dorothy Dehner
- Arthur Dove, born in Canandaigua
- Wilhelmina Weber Furlong (1878–1962) of Glens Falls, the first female modernist painter in the American Modernism movement.
- Sanford Robinson Gifford
- Phillip Guston
- Ellsworth Kelly
- Rockwell Kent
- Ronnie Landfield
- Robert Mangold
- Sylvia Plimack Mangold
- Brice Marden
- Fletcher Martin
- Arto Monaco of Upper Jay, artist, theme park designer, toy designer, and cartoonist.
- Samuel Morse (1791–1872), a painter perhaps best known for his portraits, lived on his estate, Locust Grove in the Town of Poughkeepsie
- Grandma Moses
- Georgia O'Keeffe, resident of Lake George
- Marla Olmstead, Binghamton
- Albert Paley (*1944), Rochester, modernist metal sculptor
- Larry Poons
- Frederic Remington (1861–1909), painter, illustrator, sculptor, and writer
- Manuel Rivera-Ortiz (*1968), Rochester, photographer
- Randall Schmit – painter
- David Smith, Bolton Landing
- Frank Stella
- Alfred Stieglitz (1864–1946), resident of Lake George, photographer
- William James Stillman (1828–1901), painter, journalist, and photographer
- Seneca Ray Stoddard (1844–1917), photographer
- Israel Tsvaygenbaum, Russian-American artist
- Bradley Walker Tomlin

=== Venues ===
- Byrdcliffe Colony
- The Roycroft workshop
- Storm King Art Center
- Art Omi, Ghent, New York

=== Collections ===
- Dia:Beacon
- Columbia County Historical Society, Columbia County, New York

== Cartoonists ==
- Scott Adams, the creator of the Dilbert comic strip, was born in Windham, New York and is an alumnus of Hartwick College.
- Brad Anderson of Marmaduke, lives in Chautauqua County
- Vaughn Bode of Cheech Wizard, born in Utica, New York
- Nicholas Gurewitch, the creator of the Perry Bible Fellowship web comic, was born in Canandaigua, New York, and is an alumnus of Syracuse University. He now resides in Rochester, New York.
- Johnny Hart (of B.C. and The Wizard of Id), from Endicott
- Margaret Shulock of Six Chix, resides in Franklinville
- Tom Toles, The Washington Post editorial cartoonist, from Buffalo
- Garry Trudeau of Doonesbury, raised in Saranac Lake

== Photographers ==
- Charles Bierstadt
- George Eastman
- Milton Rogovin
- Carleton Watkins

== Architecture ==
=== Architects and builders ===
- Louise Blanchard Bethune (1856–1913), born in Waterloo was the first American woman known to have worked as a professional architect.
- Claude Bragdon, whose main architectural practice was in Rochester
- Daniel Burnham, Chicago architect born in Henderson
- William L. Coulter, Adirondack architect
- Andrew Jackson Downing
- William West Durant
- Harvey Ellis
- Irving Gill, San Diego architect born in Tully
- Philip Hooker
- Benjamin A. Muncil, Adirondack master builder
- James Renwick Jr., born in Bloomingdale in Essex County
- Marcus T. Reynolds of Albany
- Charles Mulford Robinson of Rochester, a chief promoter of the City Beautiful movement in America, and a pioneering urban planning theorist.
- Joseph Lyman Silsbee, Syracuse architect who upon relocating to Chicago gave Frank Lloyd Wright his first drafting job
- Ward Wellington Ward

=== Styles ===
- Adirondack Architecture, the Great Camp style
- Cobblestone masonry
- The Hudson River School
- The Hudson River Bracketed style
- Octagon houses, a mid-nineteenth-century fad promoted by Cohocton native Orson Squire Fowler in his book The Octagon House: A Home for All. An estimated half of all octagon houses were constructed in Central and Western New York. Extant examples can be seen in Akron, Brasher Falls, Syracuse, Camillus, Hammondsport, Newport and Canandaigua.

=== Buildings ===
- Olana, residence of Frederic Church
- Luykas Van Alen House, 1737 Dutch Architecture

== Design ==
=== Designers ===
- Elbert Hubbard, founder of the Roycroft Community
- Warren McArthur, furniture designer
- Adelaide Alsop Robineau, potter and editor of the ceramics publication Keramic Studio
- Gustav Stickley, Arts and Crafts furniture designer, architect and editor of The Craftsman magazine
- Leopold and John George Stickley, furniture designers and manufacturers

=== Workshops ===
- Steuben Glass Works

=== Products ===
- the Adirondack Chair
- the Adirondack guideboat
- the American Arts and Crafts (American Craftsman) Movement
- Shaker Furniture

== Folk Traditions ==
- Minstrel shows, which persisted in New York State into the mid-twentieth century

== Showbiz ==
=== Entertainers ===
- George Abbott, born in Forestville, theater producer and director, playwright, screenwriter, and film director and producer whose career spanned more than seven decades
- Lucille Ball, from Jamestown
- Tom Cruise, born in Syracuse
- William Devane, born in Albany
- Kirk Douglas, from Amsterdam, graduate of St. Lawrence University
- Susie Essman, a resident of Glenmont, is a comedian and comic actress in television and films. She is best known for her role as Susie Greene, the verbally abusive wife of Larry David's manager on the HBO show Curb Your Enthusiasm.
- Annette Funicello, born in Utica
- Vincent Gallo, born in Buffalo
- Richard Gere, graduate of North Syracuse High School
- George 'Gabby' Hayes, born in Wellsville
- Philip Seymour Hoffman, born in Rochester, New York
- Mary-Margaret Humes, born in Watertown
- Grace Jones, graduate of Central High School in Syracuse, who studied theater at Syracuse University
- Tom Kenny, actor and comedian, born in Syracuse and graduated from Bishop Grimes Junior/Senior High School. He is best known as the voice of SpongeBob SquarePants.
- John McGiver of Fulton, Schoharie County, New York
- Michael O'Donoghue, from Sauquoit
- Sam Patch, known as "The Yankee Leaper," the first famous US daredevil.
- David Hyde Pierce, born in Saratoga Springs
- Bill Pullman, born in Hornell
- Rachael Ray of Lake Luzerne
- Mark Ruffalo, a resident of Sullivan County
- Savanna Samson, a Watertown native
- John Sayles, from Schenectady
- Rod Serling, from Interlaken
- The Shubert Brothers, from Syracuse
- Arthur C. Sidman, born in Homer, a vaudeville performer and playwright.
- Maureen Stapleton, born in Troy
- Fran Striker of Buffalo, a writer for radio and comics who was best known for creating The Lone Ranger and The Green Hornet.

=== Traditions ===
- Comedians of the Borscht Belt

== Films set or made in upstate New York ==
- Brother's Keeper, a 1992 documentary about an alleged 1990 murder in the village of Munnsville, New York.
- Bruce Almighty (2003). Bruce Nolan (Jim Carrey) is a television news reporter for Channel 7 Eyewitness News on WKBW-TV in Buffalo, New York.
- Buffalo '66 (1998)
- Camp (2003), about an upstate New York performing arts summer camp. The film was filmed at the Stagedoor Manor summer camp in Loch Sheldrake.
- Canadian Bacon (1995). John Candy plays a local sheriff named Bud B. Boomer. The movie was filmed in Toronto, Hamilton, and Niagara Falls, Ontario; and Buffalo and Niagara Falls, New York.
- Down to the Bone (2005). The main character is a checker at Price Chopper.
- The Farmer Takes a Wife, a 1935 comedy film. Dan Harrow (Henry Fonda) works along the Erie Canal during the mid-19th century to raise money to buy a farm. A musical remake appeared in 1953. The films were based on a 1934 play by Frank B. Elser and Marc Connelly, based in turn on the novel Rome Haul by Walter D. Edmonds.
- Frozen River (2008) set in and around Massena and the Mohawk Nation of Akwesasne, but filmed in Plattsburgh and elsewhere in Clinton County.
- Gasland (2010), a documentary that negatively portrays the efforts of natural gas drilling in the Marcellus Formation
- Haldane of the Secret Service (1924), directed by and starring Harry Houdini, co-starring Gladys Leslie as Adele Ormsby, with William J. Humphrey as Edward Ormsby, filmed at Beaver Kill Falls in the Village of Valatie.
- The Horse Whisperer (1998) with Robert Redford. Some scenes were shot in Saratoga Springs. The crew also attempted to use the bridge located on Tabor road in Mechanicville for the snowy bridge scene in this movie, but ended up using one in California instead.
- Ironweed (1987), set in Albany
- Lady in White (1988) a horror film of the ghost/mystery genre. Much of the film was made in Wayne County. The movie is based on the story of The Lady in White who supposedly searches for her daughter in Durand-Eastman Park in Rochester, New York while protecting young women who are on dates with their boyfriends. The film was directed, produced, and written by Frank LaLoggia, a native of Rochester.
- The Natural (1984), starring Robert Redford, Robert Duvall, Glenn Close. Many of the baseball scenes were filmed in Buffalo, New York's War Memorial Stadium, built in 1937 and demolished a few years after the film was produced. Buffalo's All-High Stadium stood in for Chicago's Wrigley Field in a key scene.
- Martha Marcy May Marlene (2011) Elizabeth Olsen, John Hawkes. Many stock, mountain, and lake scenes were filmed upstate in the Catskill mountains.
- Nobody's Fool (1994) filmed in Beacon, Fishkill, Poughkeepsie, and Hudson.
- Planes, Trains and Automobiles (1987) portions filmed in Gowanda.
- Slap Shot (1977) was filed in Syracuse, Utica, Clinton and Hamilton.
- The Sterile Cuckoo (1969). Much of the movie was filmed at Hamilton College in Clinton. Some of it was filmed in Sylvan Beach, New York.
- Super Troopers (2001) portions filmed in Beacon, Fishkill and Newburgh.
- Synecdoche, New York (2008) was filmed and set in part in Schenectady.
- Taking Woodstock (2009), a comedy-drama film about the Woodstock Festival of 1969 directed by Ang Lee and filmed in New Lebanon.
- Woodstock, the documentary of the 1969 music festival in Bethel, in which Arlo Guthrie marvels to the crowd, "The New York State Thruway is closed, man!"
- York State Folks (1915) from the original play by Arthur C. Sidman.
- You Can Count on Me (2000), takes place in the fictionalized Catskill communities of Scottsville and Auburn, New York. The film was primarily shot in and around Margaretville, New York.

== Major museums ==
- Adirondack Museum, Blue Mountain Lake
- Albright-Knox Art Gallery, Buffalo
- Albany Institute of History and Art, Albany
- Antique Boat Museum, Clayton
- Corning Museum of Glass, Corning
- Chapman Historical Museum, Glens Falls
- Columbia County Historical Society, Museum & Library, Town of Kinderhook
- George Eastman House, Rochester
- Erie Canal Museum, Syracuse
- Everson Museum, Syracuse
- Farmers' Museum, Cooperstown
- Genesee Country Village and Museum, Mumford
- International Boxing Hall of Fame, Canastota
- Harness Racing Museum & Hall of Fame, Goshen
- Herbert F. Johnson Museum of Art, Ithaca
- Hyde Collection, Glens Falls
- Memorial Art Gallery, Rochester
- Munson-Williams-Proctor Arts Institute, Utica
- Museum at Bethel Woods, Bethel, exhibiting the history and culture of the 1969 Woodstock Festival
- National Baseball Hall of Fame and Museum, Cooperstown
- National Museum of Racing and Hall of Fame, Saratoga Springs
- National Museum of Dance, Saratoga Springs
- National Soaring Museum, Elmira
- National Soccer Hall of Fame, Oneonta
- National Women's Hall of Fame, Seneca Falls
- New York State Military Museum, Saratoga Springs
- New York State Museum, Albany
- New York State Museum of Cheese, Rome
- Northeast Classic Car Museum, Norwich
- Frederic Remington Art Museum, Ogdensburg
- Salt Museum, Liverpool
- Strong - National Museum of Play, Rochester

== See also ==
- List of museums in New York
- List of people from Woodstock, New York
