= Homer Senior High School =

Homer Senior High School can refer to:

- Homer Senior High School (Alaska) in Homer, Alaska
- Homer Senior High School (New York) in Homer, New York
