= Hughitt =

Hughitt is a surname. Notable people with the surname include:

- Marvin Hughitt (1837–1928), American railroad tycoon
- Tommy Hughitt (1892–1961), American college football player
