= Rombout House =

Historic house in New York, United States

- U.S. National Register of Historic Places
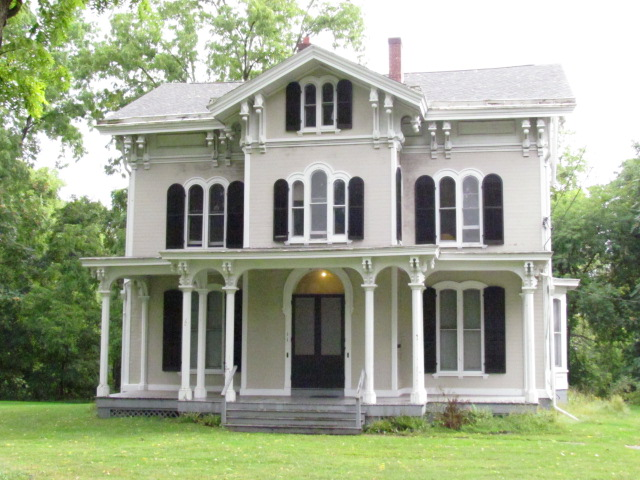
- Rombout House in September 2013

- Location within New York Location within the United States
- Location: New Hackensack Rd., Poughkeepsie, New York
- Coordinates: 41°40′47″N 73°53′39″W
- Area: less than one acre
- Built: 1854
- Architectural style: Bracketed Style
- MPS: Poughkeepsie MRA
- NRHP reference No.: 82001162
- Added to NRHP: November 26, 1982

Rombout House is a historic home located at Poughkeepsie, Dutchess County, New York. It was built about 1854 on land that had been part of the original British royal Rombout Patent of 1685 and is a 2 1/2-story, three-bay-wide, Hudson River Bracketed architectural style dwelling. It sits on a raised basement and features a central pavilion. It has been owned by Vassar College since 1915.

It was added to the National Register of Historic Places in 1982.
