= List of people from Woodstock, New York =

This is a list of notable people who are associated with the town of Woodstock, New York, United States. They may not have been born there or live there presently, or may be deceased.

== Musicians ==
- Daevid Allen – Australian singer and guitarist of Soft Machine and Gong
- John Ashton – English-born producer and guitarist for The Psychedelic Furs
- The Band members: Rick Danko, Levon Helm, Garth Hudson, Richard Manuel, and Robbie Robertson – the five shared a house together, where they recorded The Basement Tapes (with Bob Dylan) and wrote several songs for Music from Big Pink. The house, dubbed "Big Pink" is in neighboring Saugerties, though Danko, Manuel, Hudson and Helm all eventually moved to Woodstock. Danko and Helm are both buried in the Woodstock Cemetery on Rock City Road.
- Cyro Baptista – Brazilian-born percussionist
- Richard Bell – keyboardist
- Karl Berger – jazz educator, vibraphonist, founder Creative Music Studio
- Carla Bley – jazz composer, pianist, organist and bandleader
- David Bowie – songwriter, musician, actor, fashion icon
- Harvey Brooks – bassist, producer, songwriter, composer
- Paul Butterfield – blues musician
- Cindy Cashdollar – dobro player, five-time Grammy Award winner
- Jimmy Cobb – jazz drummer
- Imani Coppola – singer, songwriter, musician (early 2000s)
- Henry Cowell – composer
- Marshall Crenshaw – musician, songwriter, resident 1987–2004
- Marilyn Crispell – pianist
- Karen Dalton – singer
- Kal David – blues musician
- Jack DeJohnette – jazz drummer (Note: Kohlhasse, Bill (June 15, 1990). "DeJohnette & Co. He's Outdone Himself by Teaming Up With Hancock, Metheny and Holland". Los Angeles Times.)
- Alix Dobkin – singer-songwriter
- Robbie Dupree – singer-songwriter
- Bob Dylan – singer-songwriter, lived in Woodstock 1965–1972; had his infamous motorcycle accident in Bearsville in 1966 (Note: Heylin, Bob Dylan: Behind the Shades Revisited, pp. 267.)
- Joey Eppard – Kingston, New York-born singer, songwriter, guitarist, bassist; best known for his Kingston Rock band, 3 (Note: Barry, John W (September 9, 2005). "Secret's out 'bout 3". The Poughkeepsie Journal.)
- Donald Fagen – co-founder Steely Dan
- Matt Flynn – drummer for band Maroon 5
- Jackson C. Frank – folk singer
- Paul Green – founder of Paul Green School of Rock Music (now School of Rock)
- John Hall – musician, co-founder of Orleans
- Amy Helm – singer-songwriter and musician, daughter of Levon Helm
- Jimi Hendrix – guitarist, singer, songwriter
- John Herald – bluegrass singer, songwriter, Greenbriar Boys
- Darryl Jenifer – bassist for Bad Brains
- Bill Keith – banjo player, composer; developed melodic or Keith style banjo picking
- Steve Knight – keyboardist for Mountain
- Dr. Know – punk rock guitarist, notably for Bad Brains.
- Kramer – musician and producer, Shockabilly, Bongwater, Butthole Surfers, The Fugs
- Tony Levin – bassist
- Donna Lewis – singer, songwriter
- Frank Luther – bassist
- Jennifer Maidman – musician and producer
- John Martyn – singer-songwriter
- John Medeski – keyboardist and composer for Medeski, Martin & Wood
- Pat Metheny – Grammy Award-winning guitarist
- Charles Mingus – bassist, bandleader
- Elizabeth Mitchell – singer, composer, guitarist for indie band Ida
- Thelonious Monk – jazz musician
- Tim Moore – singer-songwriter
- Van Morrison – singer-songwriter
- Fred Neil – singer-songwriter
- Carl Newman, aka A.C. Newman – lead singer, guitarist, songwriter of The New Pornographers
- David "Fathead" Newman – jazz musician
- Pauline Oliveros – pioneering accordionist and composer
- Amanda Palmer – musician and performance artist
- Graham Parker – singer-songwriter
- David Peel – member of The Lower East Side Band
- Kate Pierson – singer, songwriter, The B-52's
- John Platania – guitarist Van Morrison
- Vasant Rai – sarod player, composer
- Bonnie Raitt – singer-songwriter
- Tom Rapp – singer-songwriter, leader of band Pearls Before Swine
- Billy Riker – guitarist, bassist and keyboard player, Kingston Rock band 3
- Josh Ritter – singer, songwriter
- Sonny Rollins – saxophonist
- Mick Ronson – guitarist, producer arranger with David Bowie
- Todd Rundgren – singer-songwriter
- David Sanborn – saxophonist
- Ed Sanders – poet, founder of Fugs band
- Carlos Santana – guitarist
- Peter Schickele – composer, best known for music he wrote as P.D.Q. Bach
- Max Schneider – Rags, Nickelodeon's How To Rock; singer and songwriter
- John Sebastian – singer, a founder of the Lovin' Spoonful
- Ravi Shankar – sitar player, composer
- Andy Shernoff – musician, songwriter, producer, founding member of The Dictators
- John Simon – musician, producer
- Robert Starer – pianist and composer
- Keith Strickland – composer, guitarist and founding member of The B-52s
- Libby Titus – singer, songwriter
- Michael Todd – bassist for Coheed and Cambria
- Artie Traum – award-winning guitarist, producer and songwriter
- Happy Traum – folk musician
- David Van Tieghem – composer, percussionist, sound designer
- Gene Ween – a founding member of band Ween
- Jim Weider – telecaster guitarist, member of The Band
- Eric Weissberg – banjo player, best known for theme from movie Deliverance
- Gary Windo – saxophonist
- C. Mortimer Wiske – conductor and organist
- Yehudi Wyner – composer, musical director of the Turnau Opera
- Rachael Yamagata – singer-songwriter; wrote album Elephants...Teeth Sinking Into Heart during nine-month period in Woodstock

== Artists ==
- Marianne Appel – painter, puppet designer, and illustrator
- Alexander Archipenko – sculptor
- George Ault – painter
- Milton Avery – painter
- George Bellows – painter
- Arnold Blanch – painter
- Lucile Blanch – painter
- James Brooks – painter
- John Fabian Carlson - painter, teacher, author
- Edward Leigh Chase – painter
- Frank Swift Chase – painter
- Andrew Michael Dasburg – painter
- Julio de Diego – painter, jeweler
- Richard Diebenkorn – painter
- Anton Otto Fischer – painter
- Harvey Fite – sculptor
- Ramona Fradon – comic book artist
- Mary Frank – painter
- Milton Glaser – graphic designer (creator of the "I Love New York" logo)
- Stephanie and Edward Godwin – English painters and illustrators
- Marion Greenwood – painter, muralist
- Philip Guston – painter
- Rosella Hartman – painter, etcher and lithographer
- Sam Henderson – cartoonist
- Robert Henri – painter
- Eva Hesse – sculptor
- Richard Humann – conceptual artist
- Alfred Hutty -painter
- Joel Iskowitz – master designer, United States Mint
- Sy Kattelson – photographer
- Yasuo Kuniyoshi – painter, sculptor
- Jacques Kupfermann – painter
- Ronnie Landfield – painter
- Elliot Landy – photographer
- Doris Lee – painter
- Laura Levine – photographer, painter, illustrator, filmmaker
- Eugene Ludins – painter and art teacher
- Ethel Magafan – painter
- Norm Magnusson – painter, sculptor, photographer, political artist
- Georges Malkine – painter
- Fletcher Martin – painter
- Paul Meltsner – painter
- Amanda Palmer – musician and performance artist
- Anton Refregier – painter
- Randall Schmit – painter
- Eugene Speicher – painter
- Bradley Walker Tomlin – painter

== Writers ==
- Shalom Auslander – author
- Larry Beinhart – author of American Hero, which was adapted for the political-parody film Wag the Dog
- Heywood Hale Broun – author and TV commentator
- Hob Broun – author
- Joseph Campbell – author, mythologist
- Jeff Cohen – media critic
- Hart Crane – poet
- Robert Duncan – poet
- Alf Evers – historian and author
- Neil Gaiman – author
- Gail Godwin – author
- Carey Harrison – novelist, dramatist
- Paul Hoffman – science author and TV host
- Barney Hoskyns – author and music journalist
- Howard Koch – screenwriter who wrote 1938 radio drama The War of the Worlds and won Academy Award for Casablanca
- Sean Lahman – historian and sportswriter
- Dakota Lane – author and photographer
- Frank Meyer – political philosopher and conservative intellectual
- Henry Morton Robinson – novelist
- Ed Sanders – author and publisher
- Ruth Simpson – author and lesbian/feminist activist
- Anita Miller Smith – historian, painter and herbalist
- Clark Strand – non-fiction spiritual writer
- Theodore Sturgeon – science-fiction author
- Amy Tan – author
- Robert Thurman – Buddhist scholar, author; father of actress Uma Thurman
- Eli Waldron – short story writer, novelist, poet, journalist, artist
- Walter Weyl – leader of the Progressive movement

== Film directors ==
- Lacey Schwartz Delgado – filmmaker and second lady of New York
- Leon Gast – director of When We Were Kings
- Sarah Pirozek – director of Free Tibet

== Actors and theater people ==
- Gaston Bell (1877–1963) – stage and silent screen actor; retired to Woodstock; first director of the Woodstock Community Players
- Chevy Chase (1943– ) – actor and comedian, grew up summering and weekending in Woodstock, where his father was born and raised
- Jennifer Connelly (1970– ) – Oscar-winning actress, lived in Woodstock for several years during her childhood
- Brad Dourif (1950– ) – Oscar-nominated actor, lived in Woodstock in the 1970s and 80s
- Ethan Hawke (1970– ) – Oscar-nominated actor, lived just outside Woodstock with then-wife Uma Thurman
- Jan Hooks (1957–2014) – actress and comedienne, lived in Woodstock at the time of her death
- Piper Laurie (1932–2023) – Oscar-nominated actress, lived in Woodstock in the 1970s
- Max Martini (1969– ) – actor, born in Woodstock
- Lee Marvin (1924–1987) – Oscar-winning actor, lived in Woodstock periodically throughout his life
- Sylvia Miles (1932–2019) – Oscar-nominated actress
- Estelle Parsons (1927– ) – Oscar-winning actress, appeared in summer stock productions in Woodstock during the 1960s
- Max Schneider (1992– ) – actor, singer, songwriter
- Uma Thurman (1970– ) – Oscar-nominated actress, lived in Woodstock during her childhood; daughter of resident Robert Thurman; returned with former husband Ethan Hawke

== Others ==
- Betty Ballantine and Ian Ballantine – founders of Bantam Books and Ballantine Books; after the 1970s, were independent publishers; said to have started the paperback book industry in America
- George Bonanno – psychologist renowned for his work on grief and trauma
- John Burroughs – naturalist
- Josephine McKim Chalmers – swimmer, medalist in 1928 and 1932 Summer Olympics; actress; sister-in law of artist Philip Guston
- John Dewey – educator, a founder of the philosophical school of Pragmatism
- William King Gregory – zoologist
- Albert Grossman – manager, producer and founder of Bearsville Records; his studio has attracted hundreds of musicians to record in Woodstock
- Steven Hager – chief editor, High Times magazine
- Phil Jackson – NBA basketball coach and player, general manager of New York Knicks
- Walter McCaw – U.S. Army surgeon who attained the rank of brigadier general in World War I
- Philippe Petit – funambulist, known for walking a tightrope between the World Trade Center Twin Towers
- Kathleen de Vere Taylor – suffragist and stockbroker
- Werner Vordtriede – professor of German and author
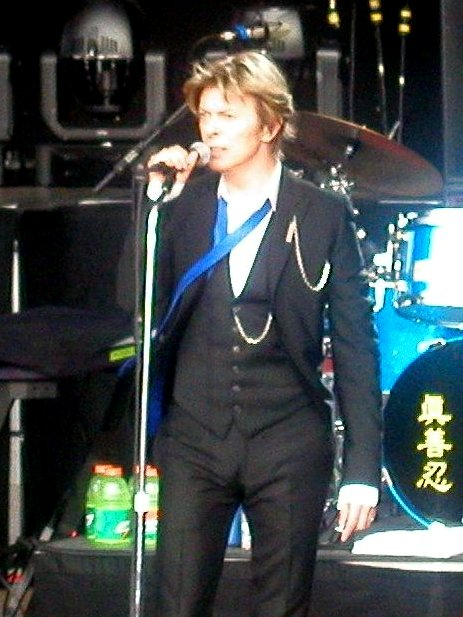
David Bowie during the Heathen Tour

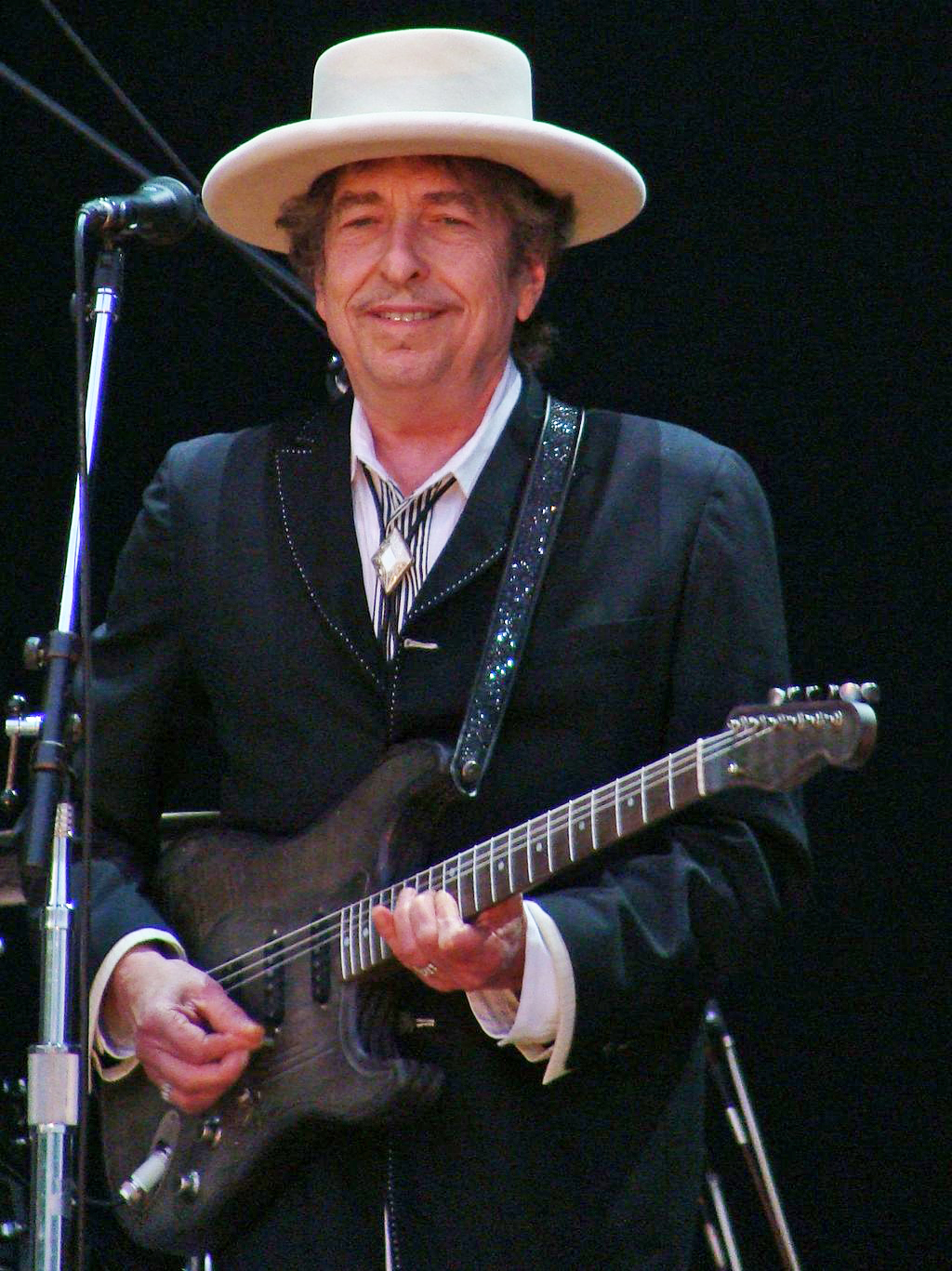
Bob Dylan at the Azkena Rock Festival in 2010

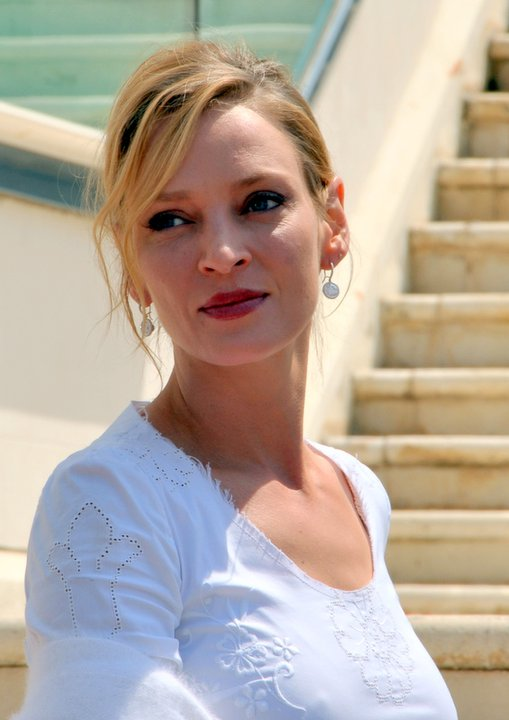
Uma Thurman at a 2011 Cannes Film Festival
