= Homer Central Schools =

School district in New York, United States

Homer Central Schools is a school district serving Homer, New York.

== Administration ==
- Superintentant: Thomas Turck
- Principal of Homer Central High School(9-12): Douglas VanEtten
- Vice Principal of the High School: James McGory
- Principal of the Junior High School(7-8): Kara Schneider
- Principal of the Intermediate School(3-6): Stephanie Falls
- Principal of the Elementary School(K-2): Douglas A. Pasquerella

== Athletics ==
- Athletic Director: Todd Lisi
- Boys: Football, Soccer, Cross Country, Basketball, Wrestling, Bowling, Hockey, Jousting, Indoor Track, Track, Lacrosse, Baseball, Tennis, Golf
- Girls: Soccer, Cross Country, Field Hockey, Volleyball, Bowling, Cheerleading, Basketball, Indoor Track, Track, Lacrosse, Softball, Tennis, Golf
