= Meriva M. Carpenter =

- Self Portrait
- Born: April 28, 1802; Ellington, Connecticut
- Died: July 24, 1887 (aged 85); Homer, New York
- Known for: Miniaturist, Landscape Painting
- Spouse: Eli Carpenter (m. 1820)

Meriva M. Carpenter (1802–1887), was a noted nineteenth-century painter of landscapes and miniature portraits.

== Personal ==
Meriva Carpenter was a daughter of Dr. Ruggles and Juliana (Pierce) Carpenter. On 27 February 1820 she married a cousin, Eli Carpenter, son of Dr. Eli and Abigail (Baker) Carpenter. They settled near the town of Homer, New York, in an area that came to be called Carpenterville, now East River, New York. Eli was a successful miller and dyer, and they were prosperous enough to build a fine house which they filled with art treasures. The artist Sanford Thayer painted portraits of Eli (displayed in the Phillips Library in Homer) and their sons, M. Volney & Henri (Hank) Carpenter. One of their children, daughter Marciana Melvina Carpenter, born December 2, 1820, was also an artist and a taxidermist. Meriva Carpenter is interred in Glenwood Cemetery, Homer, NY, the same cemetery where noted artist Francis Bicknell Carpenter, a distant cousin, portraitist of President Abraham Lincoln, is interred. Many of Meriva M. Carpenter's works reportedly survive in the Homer community.
