= Oliver Bronson House =

Historic house in New York, United States

- Plumb-Bronson House
- U.S. National Register of Historic Places
- U.S. National Historic Landmark
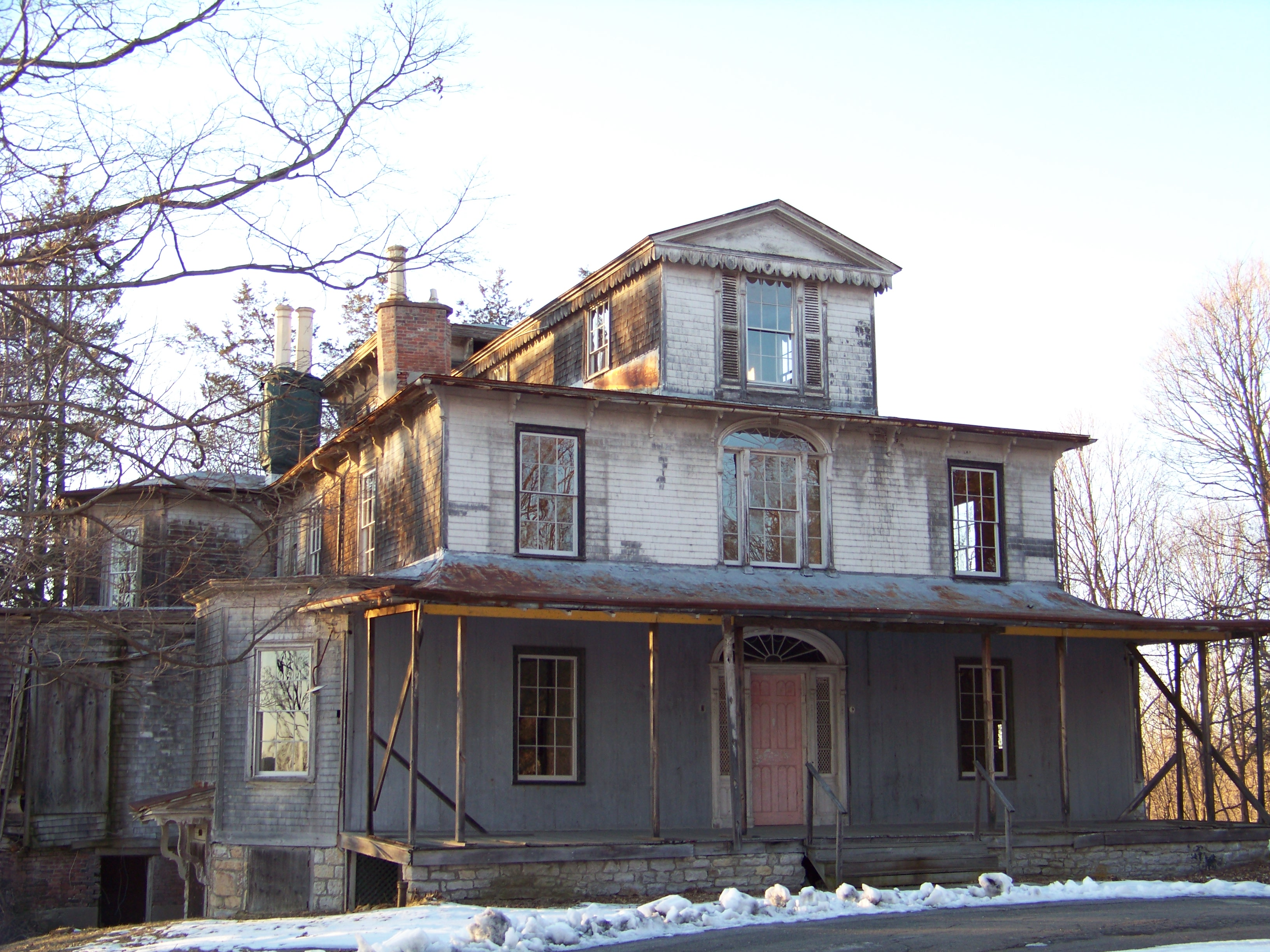
- Eastern exposure

- Location within New York Location within the United States
- Location: Worth Ave., Hudson, New York
- Coordinates: 42°14′35.23″N 73°47′8.75″W
- Area: 50 acres (20 ha) (after increase)
- Architect: Alexander Jackson Davis
- Architectural style: Hudson River Bracketed
- NRHP reference No.: 73001173 (original); 03001035 (increase)

Significant dates
- Added to NRHP: February 20, 1973
- Boundary increase: July 31, 2003
- Designated NHL: July 31, 2003

The Plumb-Bronson House, also known as the Dr. Oliver Bronson House and Stables, is a historic house on Worth Avenue (United States Route 9) in Hudson, New York. Built in 1811 and significantly altered in 1839 and 1849, it is an important early example of the Hudson River Bracketed style by Alexander Jackson Davis. The house was declared a National Historic Landmark in 2003.

== Description and history ==
The Plumb-Bronson House is located in southeastern Hudson, on the west side of Worth Avenue (US 9) just north of the town line. The estate consists of about 50 acres (20 ha) of open grass and woodlands, with most of the buildings set well back from the road. A gated drive with a small gatehouse on the south side provides access to the property. In addition to the main house, there are three outbuildings set in a cluster around it.

The house was originally built for Samuel Plumb, who purchased the site in 1811. The construction of the house has been attributed to local builder Barnabas Waterman (1776-1839), but the identity of its architect, if there was one, remains unknown. Alterations and additions to the house were designed by architect Alexander Jackson Davis and constructed in 1839 and 1849 for Dr. Oliver Bronson, who purchased the property in 1838. Davis' work converted the house into an early example of the Hudson River Bracketed style, and his influence is also evident in the adjacent outbuildings. Dr Bronson was the heir to an affluent banking family and was probably introduced to Davis by his brother in law, Robert Donaldson Jr. The grounds may be an early example of the work of landscape architect Andrew Jackson Downing.

Bronson sold the house in 1853. In the twentieth century portions of the property became the site of a girls' school, now used as a prison. The house and its immediate grounds are now leased by Historic Hudson, Inc., who have begun a restoration program.

== In popular culture ==
The house was a setting of a shoot out scene in the 2012 film Bourne Legacy, where it is burned down.

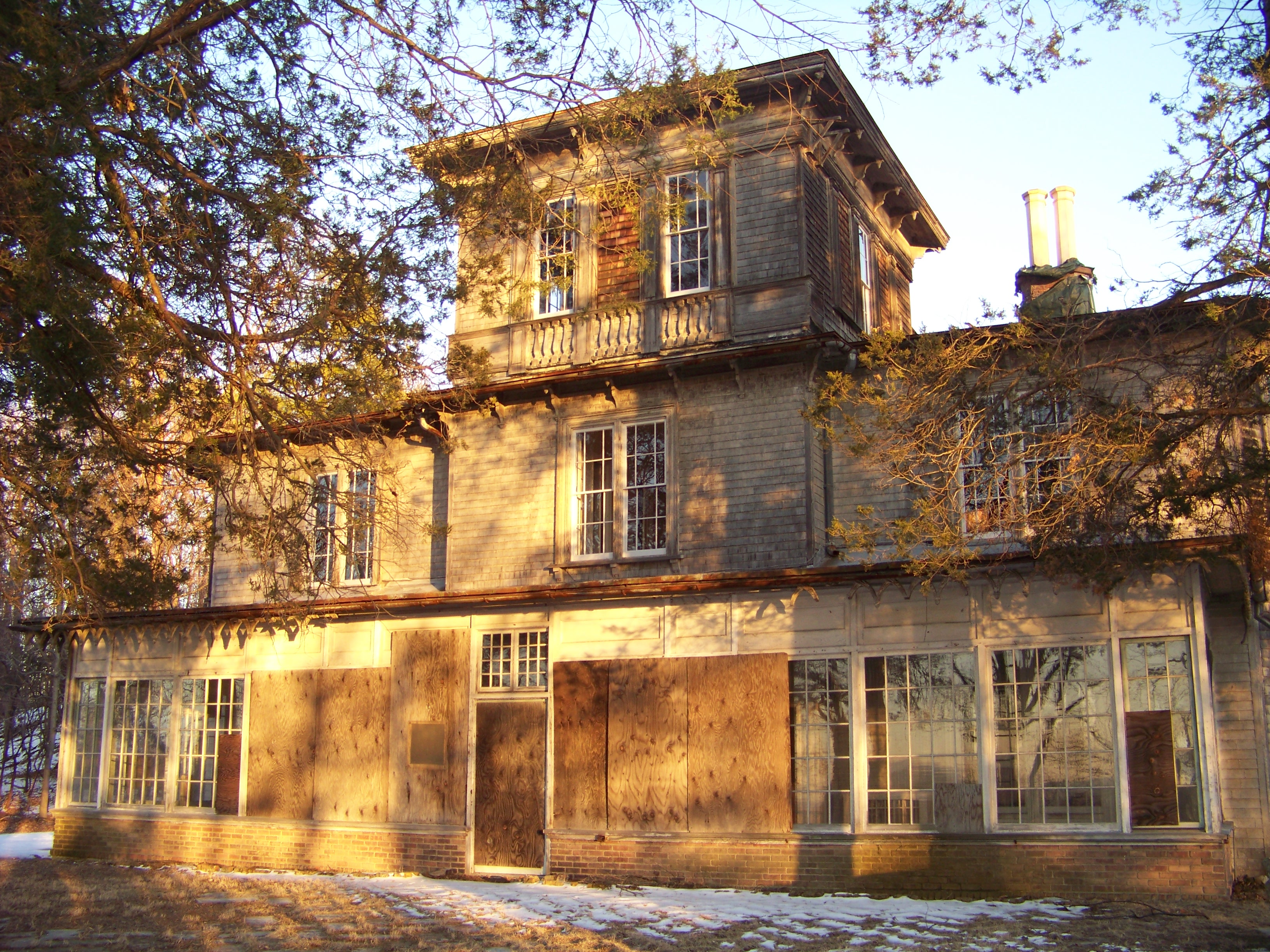
Western exposure

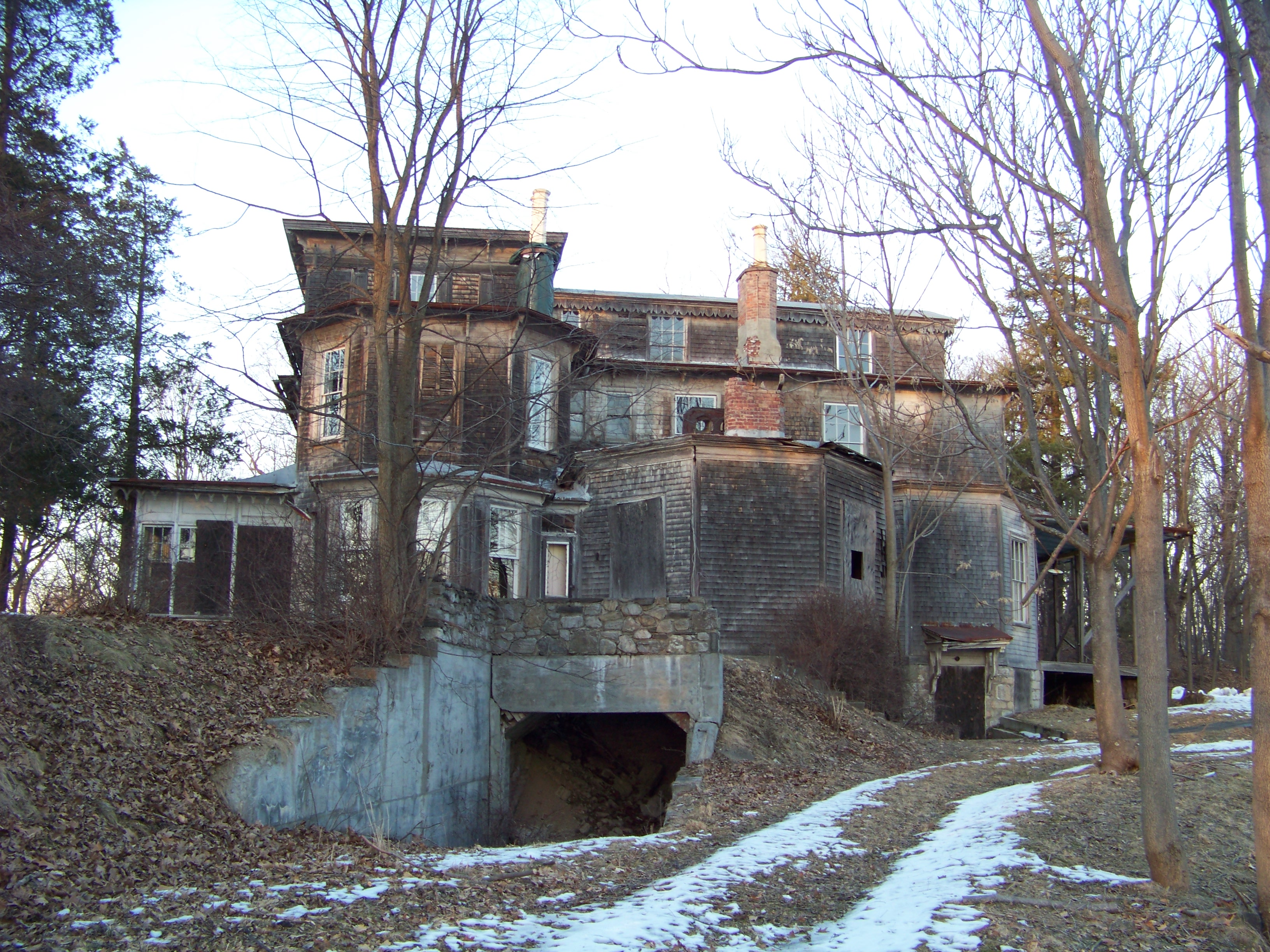
Southern exposure

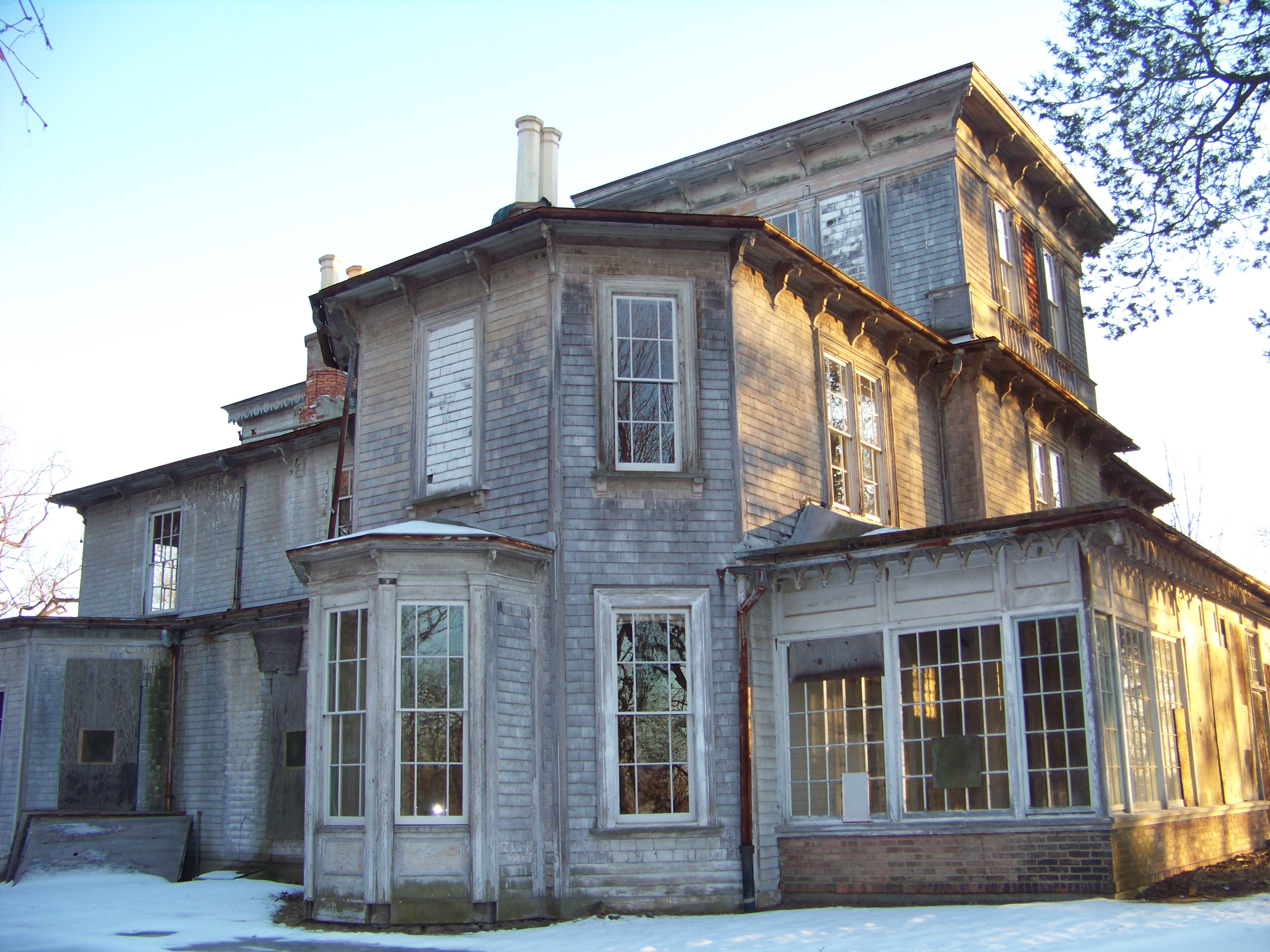
Northwestern exposure

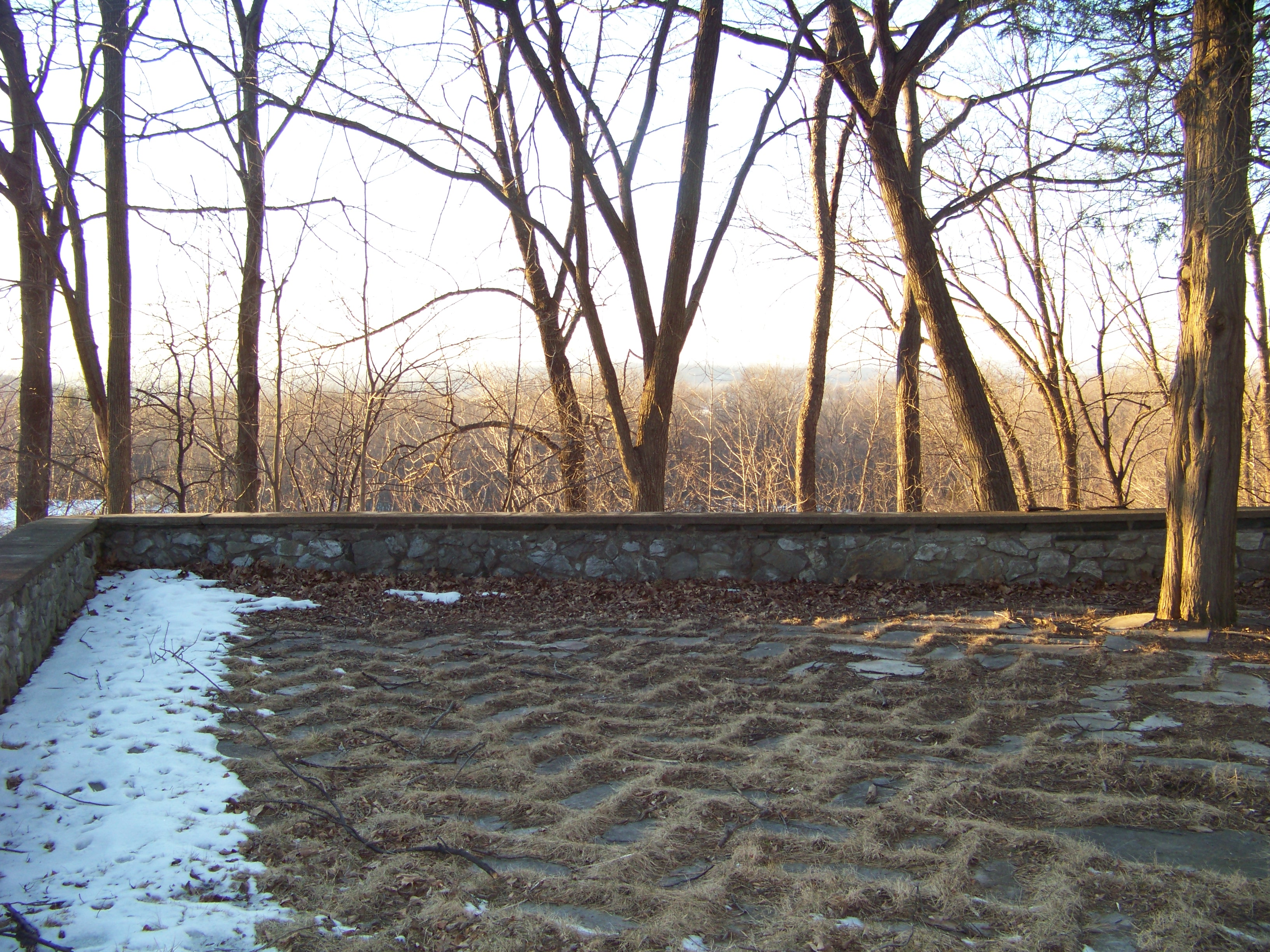
Front terrace facing west toward the Hudson River

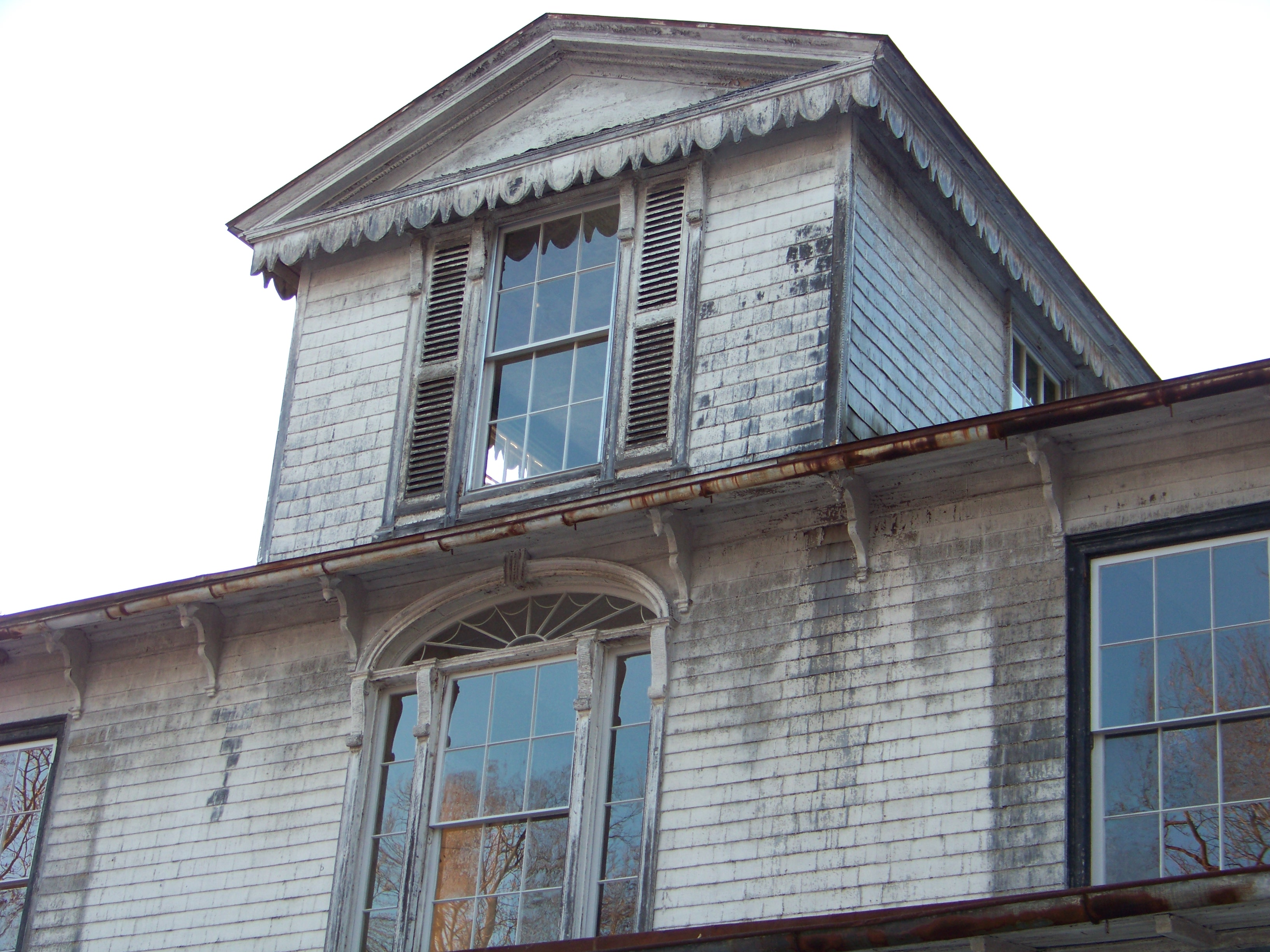
Brackets

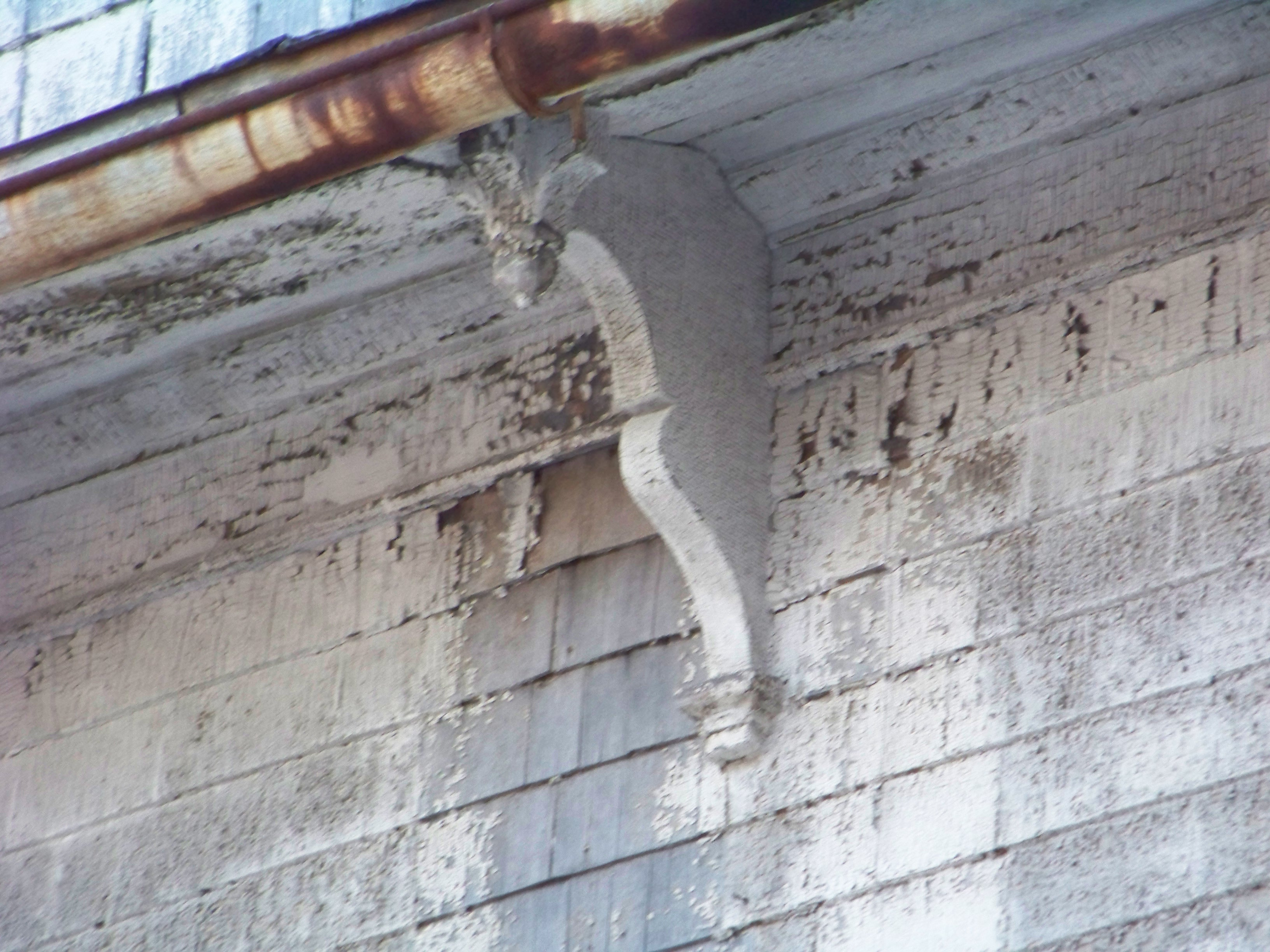
Bracket

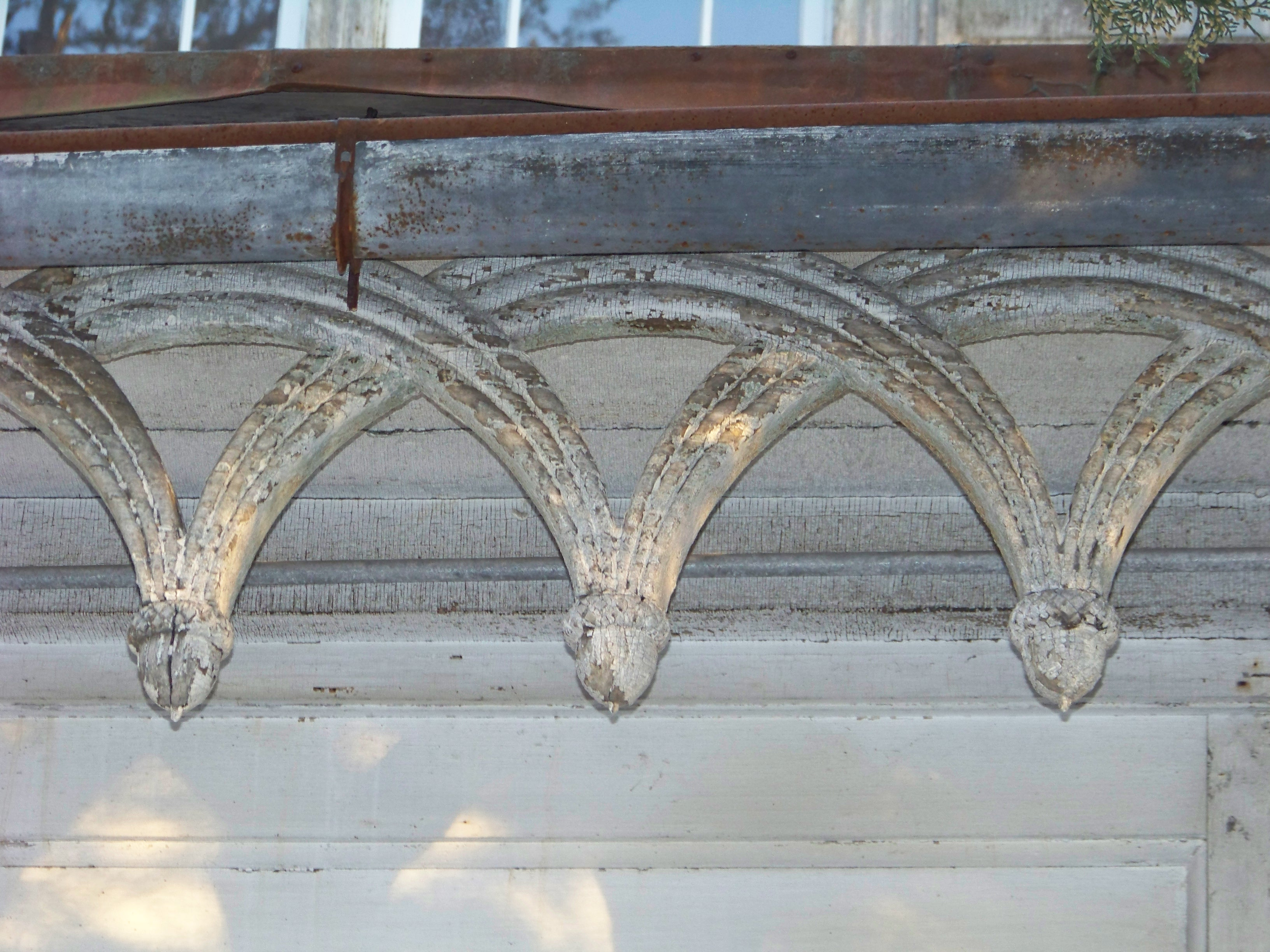
Exterior trim

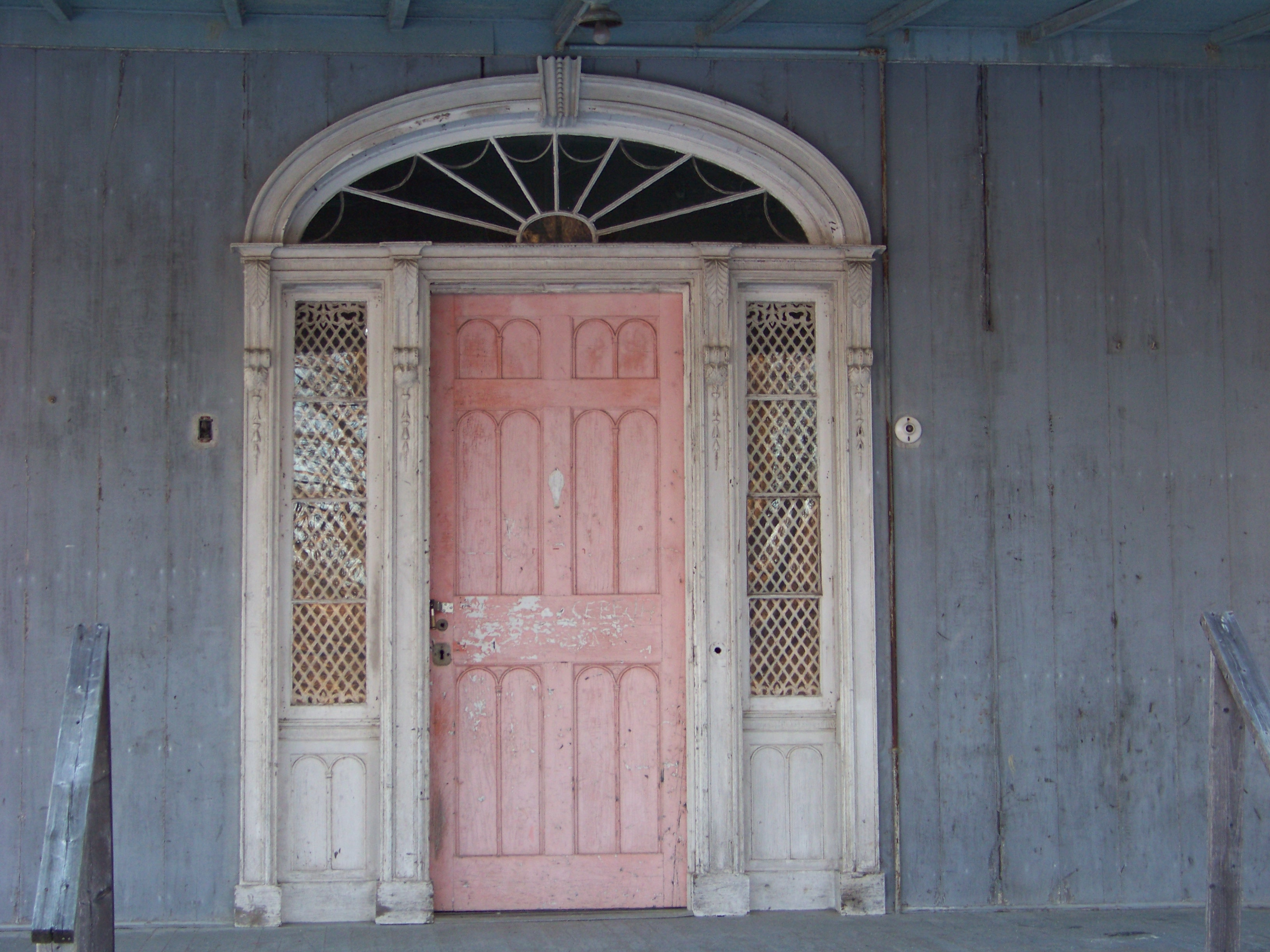
Front door

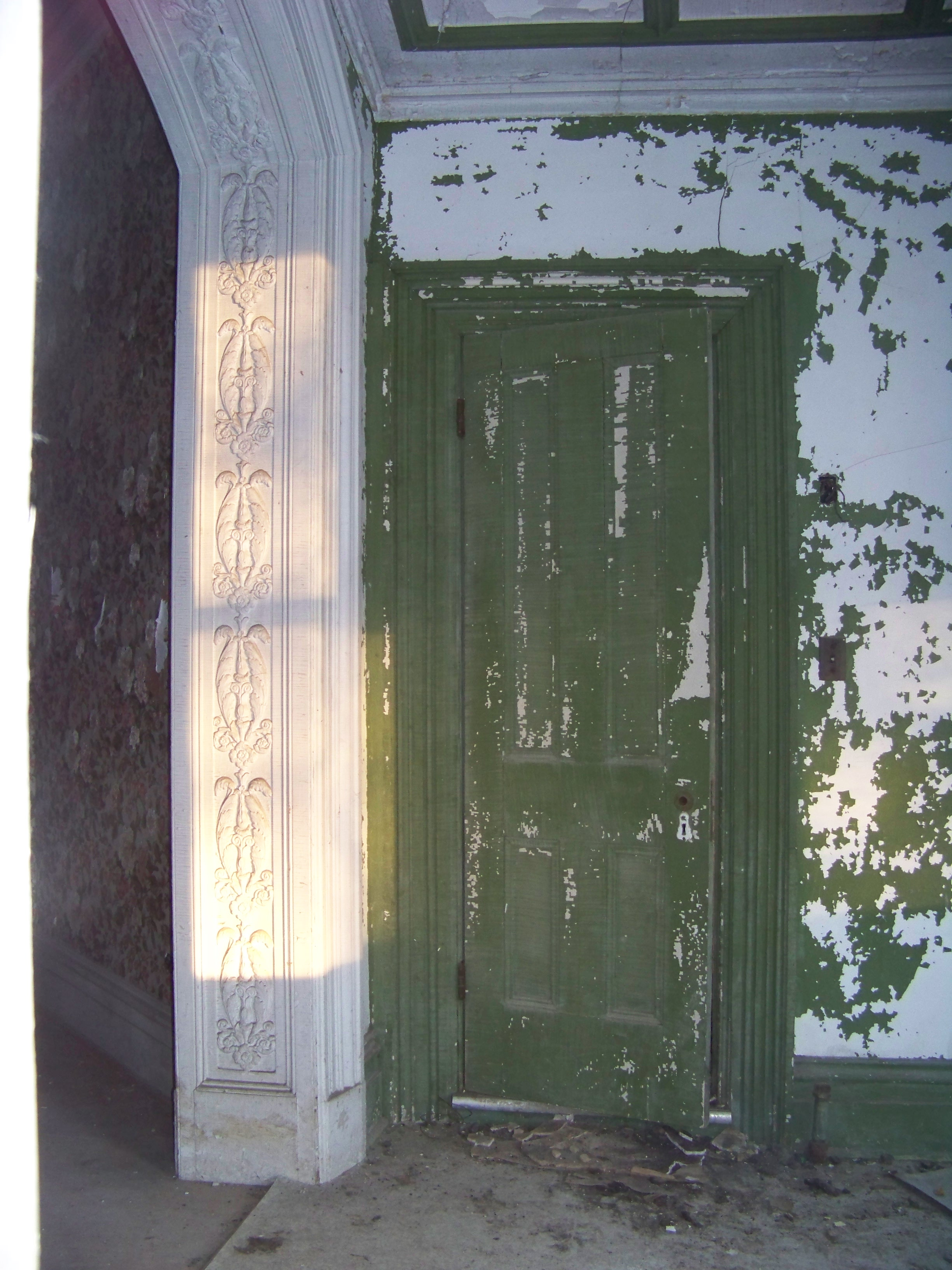
Interior

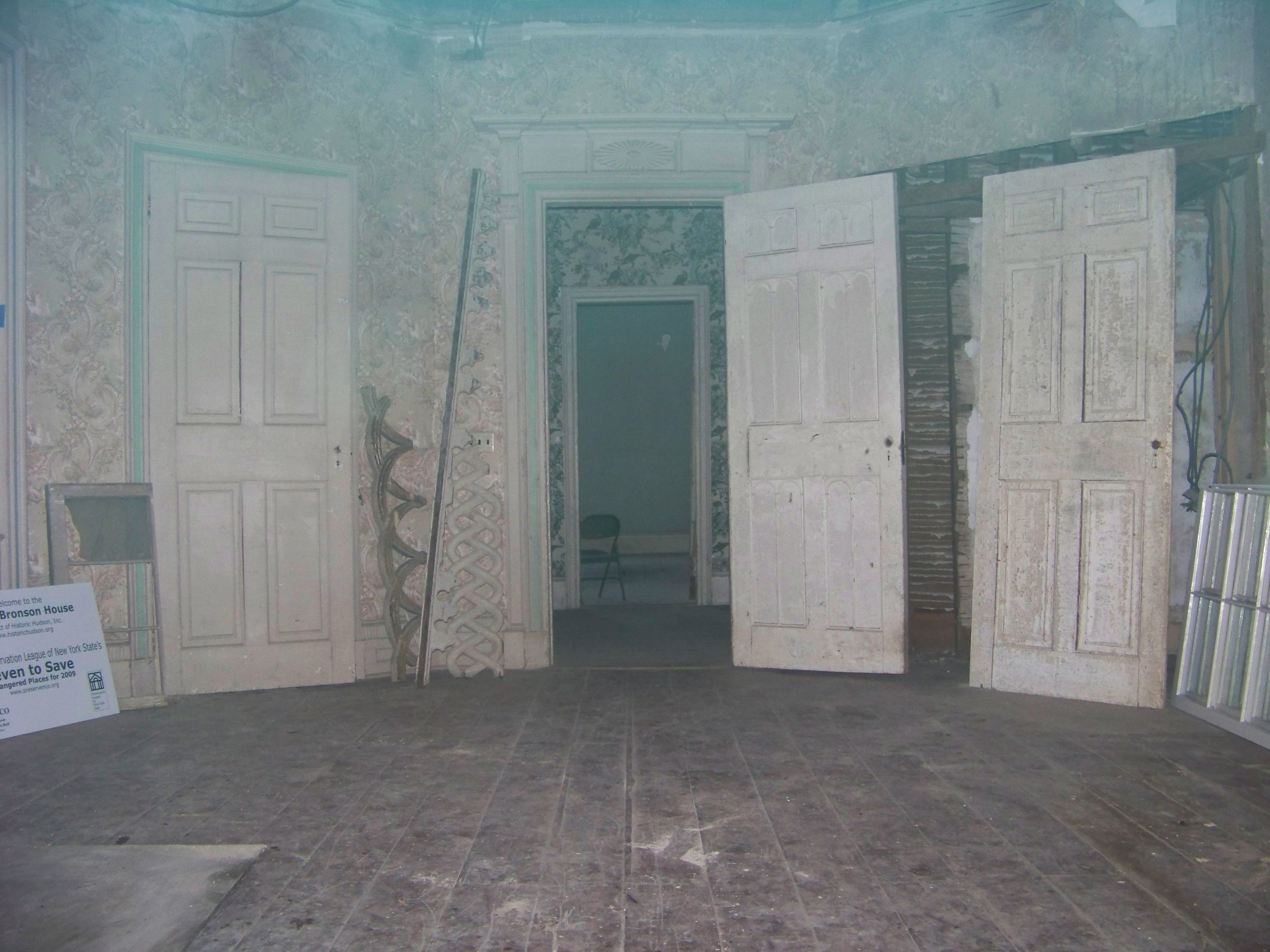
Interior

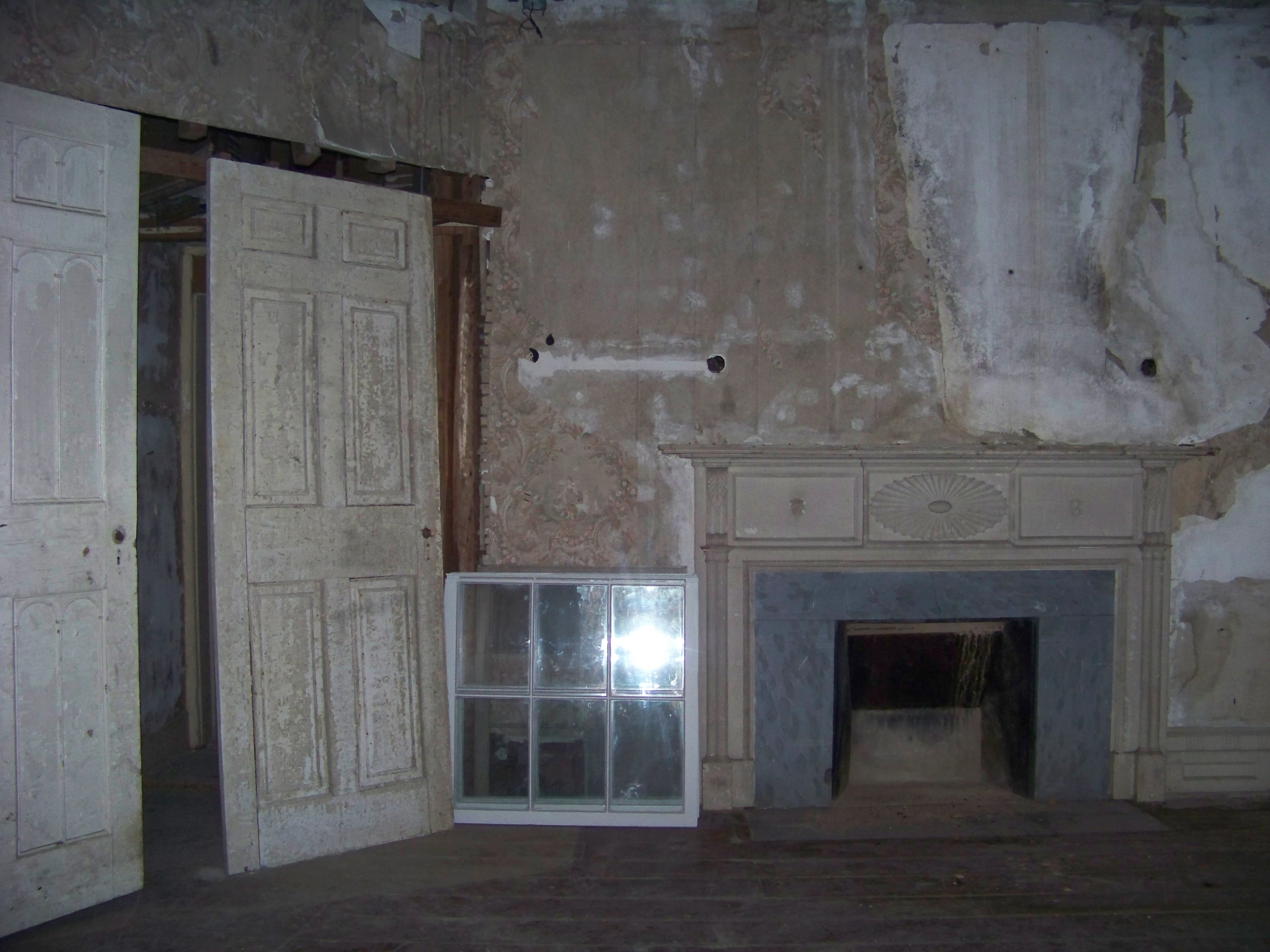
Interior
