= Sarah E. Beard =

American medical researcher (1921-2012)

- Sarah E. Beard, from a 1969 publication
- Born: Sarah Elizabeth Beard; November 12, 1921; Homer, New York
- Died: January 11, 2012 (aged 90); Baldwinsville, New York
- Occupations: Air Force nurse, medical researcher
- Years active: US Air Force, 1951–1978
- Known for: Research on decompression sickness in space

Sarah Elizabeth Beard (November 12, 1921 – January 11, 2012) was an American medical researcher, trained as a nurse. She retired in 1978 as a colonel in the United States Air Force.

== Early life and education ==
Sarah Elizabeth Beard was born in Truxton, New York, and attended high school in Homer, New York. She trained as a teacher in the state teacher's college in Albany, graduating in 1942, and then as a nurse at the Brigham Hospital School of Nursing in Boston, graduating in 1947. She later earned a master's degree in nursing service administration at Syracuse University in 1961.

== Career ==
Beard taught high school for two years in the 1940s, before training as a nurse. Her first nursing job was as a clinical instructor and nursing supervisor at Keuka College. She enlisted in the military in 1951, and worked at a Langley Air Force Base Hospital, as a flight nurse at Brookley Air Force Base, and as a flight nurse instructor at Gunter Annex. She gained administrative training at the medical field service school at Fort Sam Houston, and was assigned to the USAF hospital at Burderop Park in England.

Beard was promoted to the rank of captain in 1959. Beginning in 1961, Beard was a research scientist working on the problems of decompression sickness at the Air Force School of Aerospace Medicine, located at Brooks Air Force Base. Her paper "Comparison of Helium and Nitrogen in Production of Bends in Simulating Orbital Fights" was on the program at the Aerospace Medical Association meeting in 1966, and Major Beard was named Outstanding Nurse of the Year by the Texas Division of the Air Force Association that year. She co-authored several published scientific papers on the physiology of human bodies in orbit. Her work was consulted in planning for the Manned Orbiting Laboratory Program.

In 1969, she held the rank of lieutenant colonel, and was assigned to the Pentagon as special assistant. She was chair of the Aerospace Medical Association's Flight Nurse Section from 1968 to 1970. She was command nurse at Air Force System Command before she retired in 1978.

Her work was recognized with a United States Air Force Commendation Medal in 1968, a Joint Service Commendation Medal in 1972, and a Presidential Citation in 1982. She was named a Fellow of the Aerospace Medical Association in 1976.

== Personal life ==
Sarah Elizabeth Beard died in 2012, aged 90 years, in Baldwinsville, New York.
