= Marvin Hughitt =

American businessman (1837–1928)

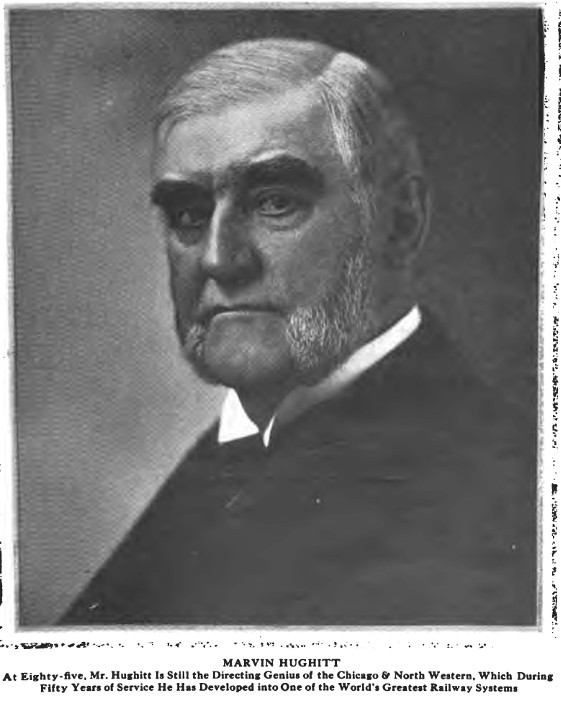
- Hughitt in a publication of the Chicago Eagle
- Born: August 9, 1837; Genoa, New York, US
- Died: January 6, 1928 (aged 90); Lake Forest, Illinois, US
- Burial place: Rosehill Cemetery
- Occupation: Railroad tycoon

Marvin Hughitt (August 9, 1837 – January 6, 1928) was an American railroad tycoon from New York. Interested in telegraphy at a young age, Hughitt quickly mastered the trade and moved to Chicago, Illinois to work. He came to the attention of the St. Louis, Alton and Chicago Railroad, who hired him to coordinate trains. This began a long career in rail, culminating in the presidency of the Chicago and North Western Railroad (1887–1910). He also served as president of two of its subsidiary lines, the Fremont, Elkhorn and Missouri Valley and the Chicago, St. Paul, Minneapolis and Omaha.

== Biography ==
Marvin Hughitt was born in Genoa, New York, on August 9, 1837. He was raised on the family farm and attended mostly public schools with some schooling in a seminary. Hughitt was interested in the telegraph when it was invented and moved to Auburn, New York to seek a position related to the field. He picked up the trade quickly and was considered a local expert within a year.

When he was seventeen, Hughitt moved to Chicago, Illinois. He had heard that the Illinois & Mississippi Telegraph Company was seeking telegraphers, and in 1854 he was hired. He rose through the ranks of the company and was made superintendent of the office under former Supreme Court of Illinois justice John D. Caton. Representatives of the St. Louis, Alton and Chicago Railroad, one of the early railways in Chicago, took notice and offered Hughitt a position as superintendent of telegraph. When the company reorganized in 1861 to become the Chicago & Alton Railroad, Hughitt left the company to take a position as trainmaster for the southern division for the Illinois Central Railroad in Centralia, Illinois.

With the onset of the American Civil War, the railroad's southern division became a critical transportation corridor. Hughitt was responsible for overseeing the massive quantities of troops and supplies from St. Louis, Missouri to Cairo, Illinois over a thirty-six-hour period. He then was tasked with moving the troops to Virginia during another thirty-six-hour shift. The incident brought Hughitt instant notoriety, and the company reassigned him to Chicago to become assistant superintendent of the railroad. In 1864, he was named general superintendent under John M. Douglas. When Douglas retired, Hughitt left the company to become superintendent of the Pullman Car Company. His stay with the company was brief until he resigned to become assistant general manager of the Chicago, Milwaukee & St. Paul Railroad.

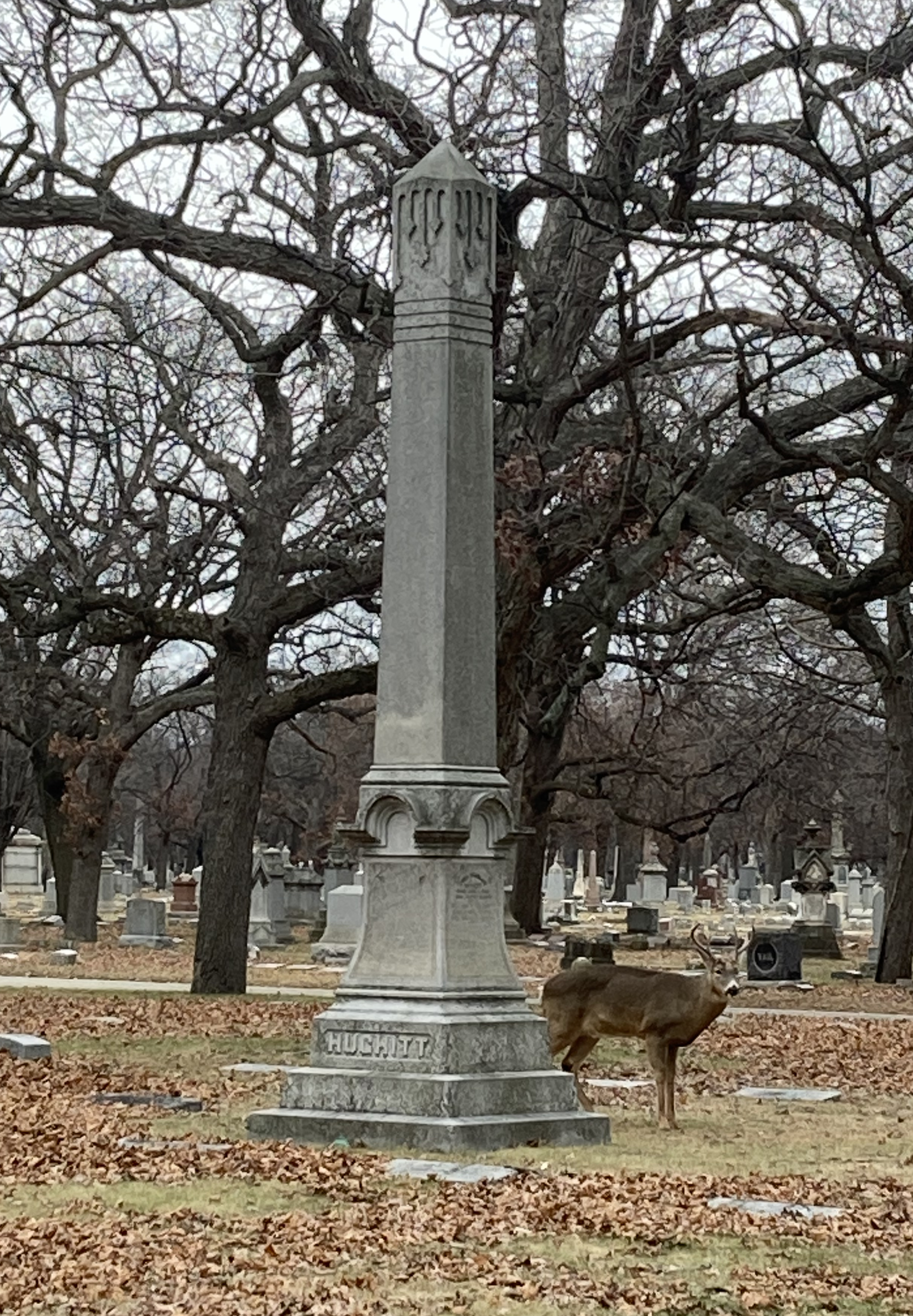
Hughitt's grave at Rosehill Cemetery

On February 1, 1872, Hughitt was named general superintendent of the Chicago and North Western Railroad (CNW). He also closely worked with James Henry Howe, the manager of the line, who was generally unfamiliar with railroads. When Howe resigned, and following a short term by Henry H. Porter, Hughitt was named general manager of the line in 1876. Four years later, the board of directors elected him Second Vice President. In 1882, he was named president of the Chicago, St. Paul, Minneapolis and Omaha Railway, a feeder line to the CNW. Two years later, he accepted the presidency of the Fremont, Elkhorn and Missouri Valley Railroad, another feeder line.

When Albert Keep was elected president of the board of directors upon its creation in 1887, Hughitt was elected to the CNW presidency. Hughitt was named a director of the Southern Pacific Railway Company in 1904. He led the CNW until his retirement in 1910. He remained chairman of the board of directors until 1925.

In his free time, Hughitt enjoyed billiards and had a room in his Prairie Avenue house dedicated to the game. He was a member of the Commercial Club of Chicago, serving a term as its president. He died at his home in Lake Forest, Illinois after a stroke on January 6, 1928, and was buried at Rosehill Cemetery in Chicago.
