= Albert Keep =

American railroad official and financer (1826–1907)

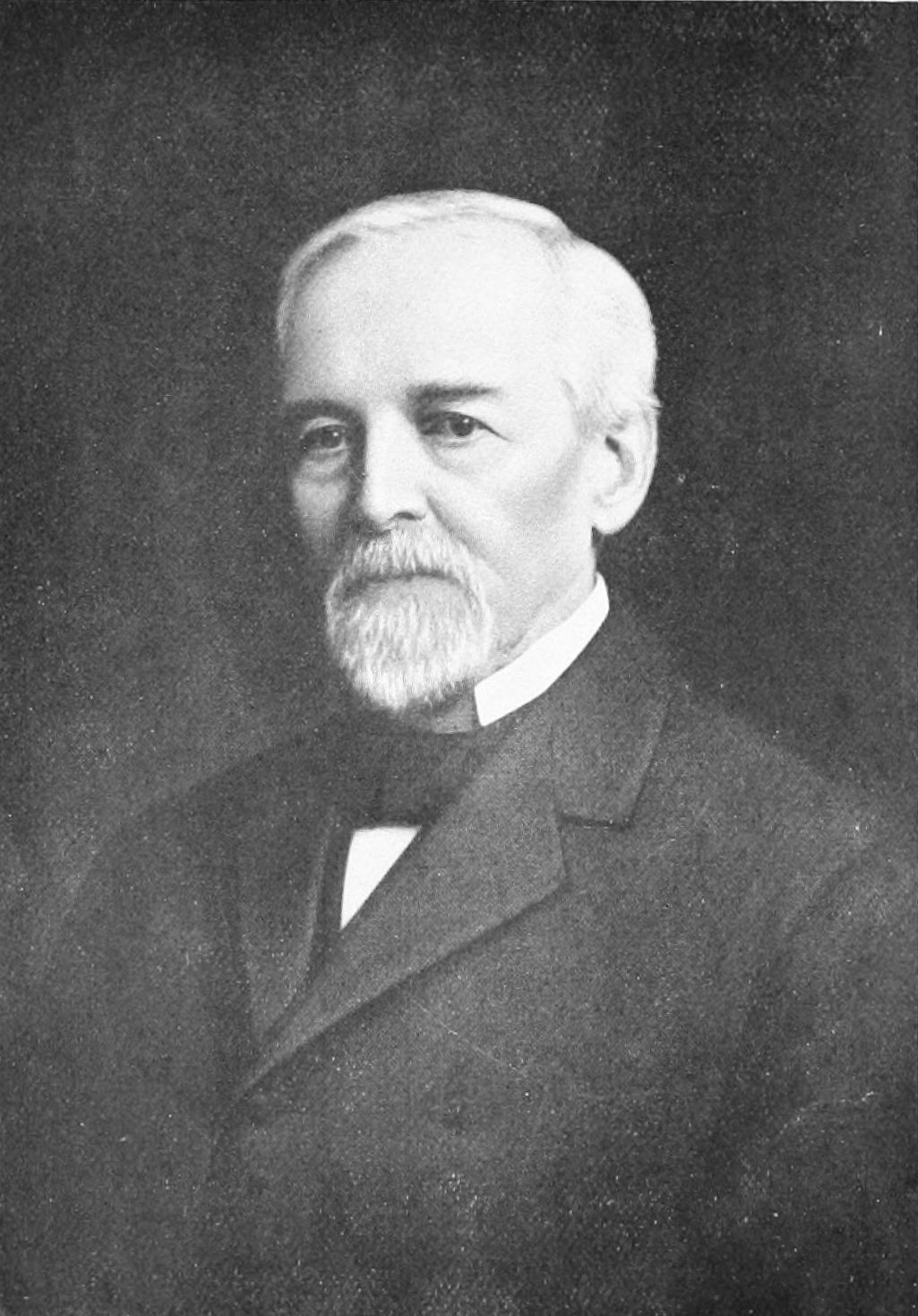
- Born: 1826; Homer, New York, US
- Died: May 13, 1907 (aged 80 or 81); Chicago, Illinois, US
- Occupations: Railroad official; financer

Albert Keep (1826 – May 13, 1907) was an American railroad official and financier.

== Biography ==
He was born in 1826 in Homer, New York.

Keep moved to Whitewater, Wisconsin, in 1846. He became a leading merchant there, working along with his brother, Henry, and Philander Peck. The Keeps and Peck relocated to Chicago, Illinois in 1851. They were involved in trade and began to accumulate wealth. The brothers took an interest in promoting the Chicago and North Western Railway, which Albert served as its director and president for fourteen years. They also supported the Lake Shore and Michigan Southern Railway, serving as director for eighteen years. As a result of his leadership the railroad became one of the best built, equipped, and managed in the midwest.

Albert Keep died in Chicago on May 13, 1907.

== See also ==
- List of railroad executives
