= Colorblind James Experience =

American alternative roots/pop/rock band

- Origin: Rochester, New York, United States
- Genres: Polka, country, cocktail jazz, blues, rockabilly, Tex-Mex, rock and roll
- Years active: 1978–2001
- Labels: Fundamental/Red Rhino, Gold Castle, Red House, Stub Daddy Records
- Members: Rita Coulter, John Ebert, Gary Holt, Charles Jaffe, Chuck Cuminale (Colorblind James), James McAvaney, Tommy Tramontana
- Past members: Uncle Phil Marshall, Kevin McDevitt, Gene Tighe, Thad Iorizzo, Dan O'Donnel, Dave Fisher, Scott Young, G. Elwyn Meixner, Bernie Haveron, Ken Frank, Dave McIntire, Carl Gedt, Ian Cranna, Joe (The Bone) Colombo, Bob Miller, Lou Alano, Ethan Lyons, Jim Schwarz
- Website: colorblindjames.com

Colorblind James Experience was an American alternative roots/pop/rock band. Bandleader and singer/songwriter/guitarist "Colorblind" James Charles Cuminale was originally from Rochester, New York, but assembled early versions of what would become the Experience in Oswego, New York, before relocating to San Francisco, California. After a couple years of mixed results, the band regrouped and moved back to Rochester, which remained its home base until Cuminale's premature death in 2001. The band enjoyed brief fame in the UK and Europe after BBC DJ John Peel gave the Experience some exposure. Their "Dance Critters" single reached number 10 on the UK Indie Chart, while their albums Colorblind James Experience and Why Should I Stand Up reached numbers 5 and 13 respectively.

The group's music blended elements of polka, country, cocktail jazz, blues, rockabilly, Tex-Mex, rock and roll and other genres. The band's sound was to a large extent inspired by the "old, weird America" chased by Bob Dylan and The Band during their Basement Tapes period, but other prominent influences included Ray Charles, Randy Newman, and Van Morrison.

The group's line-up changed repeatedly over the years, and their third album was released under the name of Colorblind James and the Death Valley Boys.

== History ==
=== 1978-1981: Formation ===
In 1978, Colorblind James & The White Caps was formed in Oswego, New York. The band was named in homage to both Gene Vincent and the Blue Caps, as well as the white caps of Lake Ontario. While primarily based around the original songs of Chuck Cuminale, a.k.a. Colorblind James, the band also played original songs by lead guitarist G. Elwyn Meixner. Rounding out the line-up were Rush Tattered, née Russell Tarby, on lead vocals, Kevin McDevitt on drums and Terry O’Neill on bass.

The group drew a large and loyal following to the Market House Music Hall located on Oswego's Water Street. The songs were mostly executed in a fast and frantic two-beat style propelled by Kevin McDevitt's drumming.

=== 1980-1984: From Oswego to San Francisco, San Francisco to Rochester ===
In the summer of 1980, after enjoying two years of success in their hometown, Cuminale looked west to San Francisco as the ‘next step’ for the band. Inviting the entire band to join him, he was surprised to find only McDevitt was eager to make the trip. He recruited Phil Marshall to take over on guitar and Gene Tighe to play bass. In the fall of 1980, the four members caravaned west with Marshall and McDevitt arriving the day after Thanksgiving.

During the band's time in San Francisco, Tighe was replaced by Oswego native Thad Iorizzo who was, in turn, replaced by Dan O'Donnell and then Dave Fisher. The band later changed their name to the Colorblind James Experience. The band released one 45 rpm record, "Talk To Me", to little critical or commercial success. In the summer of 1984, the band dissolved and Cuminale and his wife moved back east to Rochester, New York. Guitarist Phil Marshall rejoined the band a few months later.

In Rochester, the band included former White Caps guitarist G. Elwyn, bassist Bernie Heveron (an alumnus of Personal Effects) and Jim McAvaney on drums. The band scraped together enough money to press 1000 copies of its debut self-titled LP in 1987. Cuminale sent one copy abroad and specifically to BBC Radio's John Peel. The song "Considering a Move to Memphis" made Peel's year end Festive Fifty list.

=== 1987-1990: Record contract; fame in the UK ===
The band was signed to Fundamental Records in the US and its sister company, Red Rhino, in the UK. Prior to touring, G. Elwyn left the band, followed shortly by Bernie Heveron. Auditions were held and the remaining trio were joined by David McIntire on clarinet/sax, John Ebert on trombone and Ken Frank on bass.

On October 17, 1988, the band landed at Heathrow Airport and embarked on what would be the first of three European tours. They soon recorded two BBC sessions, one for John Peel on October 18, and another for Andy Kershaw on the 20th.

The band followed up its debut LP with Why Should I Stand Up?, which was released on Cooking Vinyl in the UK and Capitol subsidiary Gold Castle in the US. The all-acoustic album Strange Sounds From the Basement was released only in the UK and found the band working under the name Colorblind James and the Death Valley Boys, though they were subsequently dropped by Cooking Vinyl and Gold Castle.

The band performed live on WVBR's Bound for Glory radio show in Ithaca, NY as Colorblind James and the Death Valley Boys from 1986 through 1991.

=== 1991-2001: Later years ===
In 1992, the group released Solid! Behind The Times on Red House Records. While the label pinned their hopes on the CD's success, the band was not in a position to tour the States extensively since the time between 1991 and 1993 found many long-time members leaving the band.

In 1996, the group released their sixth album, I Could Be Your Guide. On the album, Cuminale and McAvaney were joined by Gary Holt on bass, Tommy Tramontana on guitar, “Brother” Charles Jaffe on keyboards, Rita Coulter on vocals, and Ethan Lyons on saxophone. In 1999, the group released their final studio album, Call Of The Wild. Chuck Cuminale died of arrhythmia in July 2001.

On July 8, 2008, a tribute to Chuck and his music was performed by an ensemble composed of musicians who had played with various incarnations of the band, as well as Chuck's son Mark on guitar. The performance was recorded for WXXI's OnStage.

== Discography ==
=== Singles ===
- "Blind Girl" b/w "America America" (as Colorblind James & The White Caps) (1980) 7-inch 45 rpm
- "Talk To Me" b/w "Kojak Chair" (1983) 7-inch 45 rpm
- "Sophisticated" b/w "Havoc Theme" (1988) 7-inch 45 rpm
- "Dance Critters" (1988) 12-inch 45 rpm re-mix
- "That's Entertainment" b/w "Buster Cornelius" (1989) 7-inch 45 rpm

=== Albums ===
- Colorblind James Experience (1987)
- Why Should I Stand Up? (1989)
- The Peel Sessions EP (1989)
- Strange Sounds from the Basement (1990) (as Colorblind James and the Death Valley Boys)
- The Rochester Sessions (1992)
- Solid! Behind the Times (1992)
- I Could Be Your Guide (1996)
- Call of the Wild (1999)
- Greatest Hits! (2000)
