= Hudson River Bracketed architectural style =

The Hudson River Bracketed architectural style was originated by architect Alexander Jackson Davis. An example of his implementation is in Oliver Bronson House, a National Historic Landmark built for Dr. Oliver Bronson. Another example is the Rombout House at Poughkeepsie, New York, added to the National Register of Historic Places in 1982.

== In popular culture ==
Hudson River Bracketed is the title of one of American writer Edith Wharton's latter novels, published in 1929.
