= Arthur C. Sidman =

American dramatist (1863–1901)

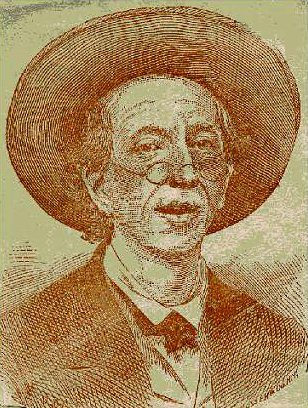
- Photograph courtesy George Musante
- Born: August 3, 1863; Homer, New York, U.S.A.
- Died: August 16, 1901 (aged 38); Higgins Beach, Maine, U.S.A.
- Occupations: Actor, playwright
- Writing career
- Years active: 1890–1908

Arthur C. Sidman (August 3, 1863 – 16 August 1901) was the son of a blacksmith who became a popular American vaudeville performer and playwright.

== Early life ==
Sidman was born on August 3, 1863, to Peter and Elvira Sidman at the small town of Homer in upstate New York. Sidman began at an early age working as a typesetter, handyman and eventually reporter for a small newspaper in his home town before moving to the nearby town of Tully to work on the local paper there. In Tully he became involved with an amateur theater that soon found success with their production of the play Foiled which the group later performed in a number of towns across the region. At this point Sidman decided to abandon his newspaper career in favor of the theater.

== Career ==
In 1891 Sidman entered vaudeville with his character sketch A Bit of True Life. In time he would gain fame as a vaudeville comedian and character actor for his dead-on portrayals of the stereotypical Yankee farmer. Of the plays and skits he wrote, Summer Showers (ca. 1895) and York State Folks (ca. 1900) were his most successful. The latter, one of several comedies he wrote about pastoral life in upstate New York, would go on after his untimely death to be produced on Broadway and have successful runs across the country. A film version of York State Folks starring veteran actor James Lackaye was released in 1915.

== Marriage ==
In 1887 Sidman married Bertha Gardner, the daughter of a Tully area farmer. She died at age 19 on May 31, 1888, ten days after giving birth to their son Ralph. On April 20, 1891, he married actress Ella (Eleanor) M. Brooks at Hornellsville, New York. After his death, both Ella and later their daughter, Marjorie, would tour for a number of years in productions of “York State Folks”.

== Death ==
Arthur Sidman died suddenly on August 12, 1901, at Higgins Beach, Maine, a small community 100 miles north of Boston, Massachusetts. He had gone there with his family to rest and to put final touches on York State Folks before the fall touring season began.
