= Homer Senior High School (New York) =

High school in New York, United States

Coordinates: 42.630446°N 76.190894°W

Homer Central High School is a grades 9–12 high school which is part of Homer Central Schools in Homer, New York. The current principal is Douglas VanEtten. The school mascot is a Trojan warrior.

== History ==
Homer Central High School traces its history back to 1819, when it was known as Cortland Academy.

== Student body ==
Homer Central High School has a total of 1,951 students as of 2017–2018

== Alumni ==
=== Cortland Academy ===
- Henry Davenport Northrop, presbyterian minister and prolific author of non-fiction historical compendiums
