= Homer, New York =

- Town
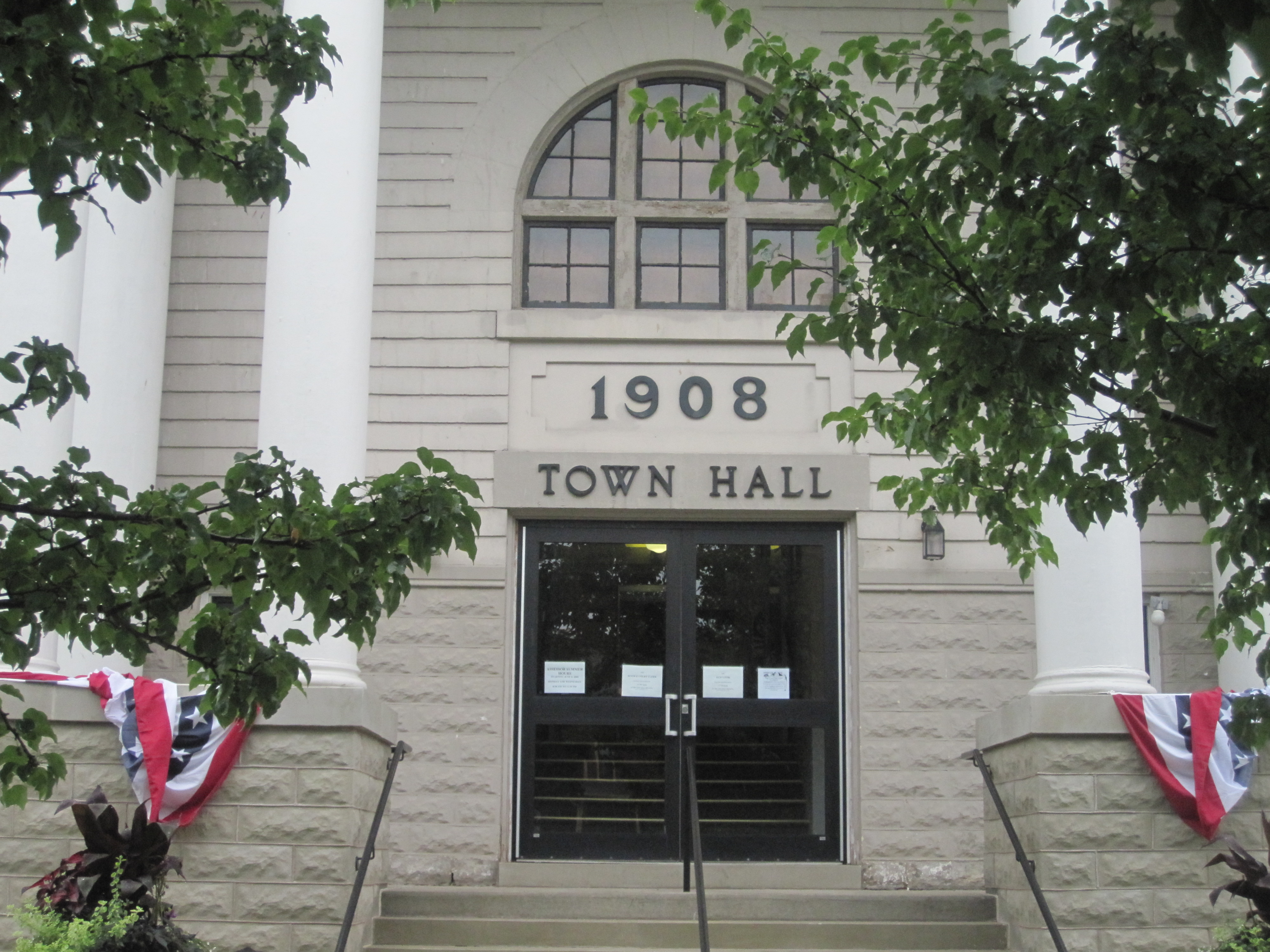
- Town Hall, Homer, NY

- Location within Cortland County and New York

- Location in the United States Homer (New York)
- Coordinates: 42°38′13″N 76°10′43″W
- Country: United States
- State: New York
- County: Cortland

Government
  - Type: Town Council
  - Town Supervisor: Frederick J. Forbes (R)
  - Town Council: Members: • Brian D. Young (R); • Kevin M. Williams (R); • Dan A. Weddle (R); • Barry E. Warren (R)

Area
  - Total: 50.68 sq mi (131.26 km^{2})
  - Land: 50.22 sq mi (130.07 km^{2})
  - Water: 0.46 sq mi (1.19 km^{2})
- Elevation: 1,133 ft (345 m)

Population (2020)
  - Total: 6,293
  - Density: 124.7/sq mi (48.15/km^{2})
- Time zone: UTC-5 (Eastern (EST))
  - Summer (DST): UTC-4 (EDT)
- ZIP Codes: 13077 (Homer); 13087 (Little York); 13045 (Cortland); 13101 (McGraw)
- FIPS code: 36-023-35287
- Website: townofhomerny.gov

Homer is a town in Cortland County, New York, United States of America. The population was 6,405 at the 2010 census. The name is from the Greek poet Homer.

The town of Homer contains a village called Homer. The town is situated on the west border of Cortland County, immediately north of the city of Cortland.

== History ==
The region was part of the Central New York Military Tract, from which the cash-poor New York government granted land to soldiers of the American Revolution to pay them for their service. "Homer" was the name of one of the townships in the Military Tract, this name being assigned by the state surveyor's office.

The area was settled in 1791. The Town of Homer was established when Onondaga County was formed in 1794. Cortland County was subsequently formed from Onondaga County in 1808.

In 1835, the village of Homer set itself off from the town by incorporation.

== Geography ==
According to the United States Census Bureau, the town has a total area of 50.7 square miles (131.2 km^{2}), of which 50.2 square miles (130.0 km^{2}) is land and 0.46 square miles (1.2 km^{2}), or 0.91%, is water.

The western town line is the border of Cayuga County.

Interstate 81, U.S. Route 11, and New York State Route 281 are north-south highways. New York State Route 41 and New York State Route 90 converge on Homer village from the west. New York State Route 41A converges on NY-41 in the northwest quadrant of Homer. New York State Route 13 cuts across the southeast quadrant.

The East Branch and West Branch of the Tioughnioga River flow southward through Homer. Lower and Upper Little York Lakes are fed and drained by the West Branch. All of the town except for its western edge is part of the Susquehanna River watershed. The westernmost part of the town drains west to Fall Creek, part of the Cayuga Lake watershed that ultimately drains north to Lake Ontario.

== Demographics ==
Historical population
| Census | Pop. | Note | %± |
|---|---|---|---|
| 1820 | 5,504 | | — |
| 1830 | 3,306 | | −39.9% |
| 1840 | 3,572 | | 8.0% |
| 1850 | 3,785 | | 6.0% |
| 1860 | 4,356 | | 15.1% |
| 1870 | 3,813 | | −12.5% |
| 1880 | 3,691 | | −3.2% |
| 1890 | 4,206 | | 14.0% |
| 1900 | 3,864 | | −8.1% |
| 1910 | 3,891 | | 0.7% |
| 1920 | 3,554 | | −8.7% |
| 1930 | 3,991 | | 12.3% |
| 1940 | 4,233 | | 6.1% |
| 1950 | 5,055 | | 19.4% |
| 1960 | 5,751 | | 13.8% |
| 1970 | 6,480 | | 12.7% |
| 1980 | 6,599 | | 1.8% |
| 1990 | 6,508 | | −1.4% |
| 2000 | 6,363 | | −2.2% |
| 2010 | 6,405 | | 0.7% |
| 2020 | 6,293 | | −1.7% |
U.S. Decennial Census

As of the census of 2000, there were 6,363 people, 2,446 households, and 1,746 families residing in the town. The population density was 126.3 inhabitants per square mile (48.8/km^{2}). There were 2,603 housing units at an average density of 51.7 per square mile (20.0/km^{2}). The racial makeup of the town was 98.11% White, 0.41% Black or African American, 0.22% Native American, 0.27% Asian, 0.02% Pacific Islander, 0.30% from other races, and 0.68% from two or more races. Hispanic or Latino of any race were 0.85% of the population.

There were 2,446 households, out of which 35.1% had children under the age of 18 living with them, 56.9% were married couples living together, 11.0% had a female householder with no husband present, and 28.6% were non-families. 22.0% of all households were made up of individuals, and 10.2% had someone living alone who was 65 years of age or older. The average household size was 2.57 and the average family size was 3.00.

In the town, the population was spread out, with 26.6% under the age of 18, 6.8% from 18 to 24, 28.0% from 25 to 44, 25.1% from 45 to 64, and 13.5% who were 65 years of age or older. The median age was 38 years. For every 100 females, there were 92.8 males. For every 100 females age 18 and over, there were 88.0 males.

The median income for a household in the town was $41,321, and the median income for a family was $51,968. Males had a median income of $34,873 versus $23,656 for females. The per capita income for the town was $20,145. About 6.3% of families and 9.4% of the population were below the poverty line, including 16.7% of those under age 18 and 9.2% of those age 65 or over.

== Communities and locations in the Town of Homer ==
- East Homer – a hamlet east of Homer village, located on NY-13
- East River – a hamlet southwest of East Homer
- Homer – the village of Homer is on the southern border of the town, north of Cortland on US-11 and NY-281; Homer is next to the West Branch of the Tioughnioga River
- Little York – a hamlet north of Pratt Corner on NY-281
- Pratt Corners – A hamlet north of Homer village on NY-281.

== Notable people ==
- Isaac Atwater — jurist
- Alexander O. Babcock — politician
- Horatio Ballard — lawyer and politician
- Sarah E. Beard — medical researcher
- Catherine Bertini — public servant
- Amelia Bloomer — newspaper editor, women's rights and temperance advocate
- George W. Bradford — physician and politician
- Francis Bicknell Carpenter — painter
- Meriva M. Carpenter — painter
- Patrick Conway — bandleader
- Erastus Milo Cravath — pastor
- Dale Dorman — disc jockey
- Milo Goodrich — U.S. representative
- Adin P. Hobart — politician
- William H. Hurlbut — politician
- Albert Keep — railroad official and financier
- Asa Kinney — businessman, politician, and Wisconsin pioneer
- Linda A. Mason — charity executive
- Manly Miles, zoologist and agriculturalist
- George L. Otis — lawyer and politician
- Arthur C. Sidman — vaudeville performer and playwright
- William Stoddard — journalist, inventor, and author
- Eugene A. Tucker — attorney and politician
- Eleazer Wakeley — lawyer, politician, judge, and pioneer of Wisconsin and Nebraska
- Solmous Wakeley — legislator
- Andrew Dickson White — co-founder of Cornell University and a U.S. ambassador
- Orrin T. Williams — judge, lawyer, and politician

== See also ==
- Homer Central Schools
- Homer Senior High School (New York)
