= Randall Schmit =

American painter

- Born: 1955 (age 70–71); Newark, New Jersey, United States
- Known for: painting, collage
- Awards: 2017 Pollock-Krasner Foundation Individual Artist Grant; 2014 Adolph & Esther Gottlieb Foundation Individual Support Grant; 2013 Scholarship Research and Study in Havana, CUBA by the American Friends of The Ludwig Foundation of Cuba; 2013 The Artist’s Resource Trust Award, Berkshire Taconic Community FDN, Columbia County, NY; 2012 Visiting Artist, School of Visual Arts, New York, NY; 2011 Adolph & Esther Gottlieb Foundation Individual Support Grant; 2000 US Consulate General, Istanbul, TURKEY, Invitational Travel Grant; 1983 Ludwig Vogelstein Foundation Grant

Randall Schmit (born 1955) is a contemporary American artist of Luxembourger and first-generation Dutch descent, working primarily in painting.

== Biography ==
Visual artist Randall Schmit was born in Newark, New Jersey, and grew up along the Mississippi River in Baton Rouge, Louisiana. After initial studies in architecture at Texas A&M University, Schmit began to paint, and was Studio Assistant to abstract colorist, Ray Parker (painter) during the late-seventies and early eighties in New York. Schmit's calligraphic and buoyant abstractions first came to public attention in New York in the 1980s, where he exhibited extensively in the East Village, Manhattan. His first solo exhibition in New York was held in 1982 at Betty Cuningham Gallery on Prince Street in Soho; later exhibitions of the artist's work were held in East Village venues such as José Freire's fiction/nonfiction (solo exhibition, 1987), the Pyramid Club (1986), and Virtual Garrison (1985). Schmit's paintings were characterised as "loud, cartoonish" by critic Michael Brenson during this period. Recent solo exhibitions have been in Hudson, New York at the David Bruner Gallery (2010) and at McDaris Fine Art (2013), both on Warren Street; and a (2014) solo exhibition in Woodstock, NY, at the Woodstock Artists Association Museum (W.A.A.M.) on Tinker Street.

The artist has lived and worked in the Hudson Valley of New York since the early 2000s.

== Influences ==
In addition to the obvious influences of Surrealism and the mature New York School found in the studio of Schmit's mentor, Ray Parker—a colleague of Abstract Expressionists Willem de Kooning, Robert Motherwell, Michael Goldberg and others—the graphic influence of comics and contemporary 1980s East Village Graffiti artists is also seen in Schmit's early work.

According to museum curator Lowery Stokes Sims, Schmit has been "fascinated with cartoons, which have been a starting point in his early work, and has incorporated comic imagery into his work" since at least the early 1980s.

Whether from his childhood in Louisiana, or the influence of Parker's musical interests, Schmit has long held an interest in jazz music, and was included in the important 1997 Smithsonian traveling exhibition, Seeing Jazz, alongside a quote from jazz composer, Miles Davis. Drawing with graphite and acrylic paint over snipped images from art magazines, science fiction ephemera, movie and other books and magazines, Schmit has worked with collage since 1991. During a visit to Istanbul, Turkey in 2000, Schmit studied the historic mosaics installed within the ancient architecture there. He exhibited an important group of collage paintings at Galerie Apel in Istanbul that year. These works are psychedelic in nature, with swirling comic and science fiction imagery woven into web-like trails and gestures of paint that bind disparate images together as one entity.

== Education ==
Schmit entered Texas A&M University as a student of architecture. He soon migrated to the department of fine arts there, where he graduated with BFA and MFA degrees in Painting. He also studied painting during 1979-1981 at Empire State College at the State University of New York. The artist currently lives and works in New York and Columbia County, NY.

== Honors and awards ==
- 2017 Pollock-Krasner Foundation Individual Artist Grant, New York, NY
- 2014 Adolph & Esther Gottlieb Foundation Individual Support Grant, New York, NY
- 2013 The Artist’s Resource Trust Award | Berkshire Taconic Community Foundation, Columbia County, NY
- 2013 Scholarship/Travel Sponsorship/Cultural Research and Study in Havana, CUBA by the American Friends of The Ludwig Foundation of Cuba
- 2012 Visiting Artist, School of Visual Arts, New York, NY
- 2011 Adolph & Esther Gottlieb Foundation Individual Support Grant New York, NY
- 2000 US Consulate General, Istanbul, TURKEY, Invitational Travel Grant
- 1983 Ludwig Vogelstein Foundation Grant, New York, NY

== Selected public collections ==
- Metropolitan Museum of Art, New York, NY
- New Orleans Museum of Art, New Orleans, LA
- Ogden Museum of Southern Art, New Orleans, LA
- Frederick R. Weisman Museum of Art, Malibu, CA
- Birmingham Museum of Art, Birmingham, AL
- (MoCA) Museum of Contemporary Art, Jacksonville, FL
- Taubman Museum of Art | Art Museum Western Virginia, Roanoke
- Nasher Museum of Art , Duke University, Durham, NC

== Books and catalogs ==
- Morgan, Robert C., Randall Schmit: Mysteries Behind the Walls, (catalogue) Woodstock Artists Assoc & Museum (WAAM), Woodstock, NY, 2014.
- Gillette, Frank, Randall Schmit: Warping the Eye’s Mind, (catalogue) E.M.Donahue Gallery, New York, NY, 1991.
- Simms, Lowery Stokes, Randall Schmit, (catalogue), E.M.Donahue Gallery, New York, NY 1990

== See also ==
- Abstract Expressionism
- Comic art
- Stable Gallery

== Additional references ==
- Reina, Barbara, Randall Schmit: Recent Work/Solo Exhibition at McDaris Fine Art, Hudson-Catskill Newspapers, On the Scene, Friday, June 28, 2013, p7.
- Randall Schmit at Galeri Apel, NYV [television coverage], Istanbul, TURKEY, September 15, 2000.
- Üstün Behçet, Artificial Corridor, Istanbul City Guide, September 2000.
- Randall Schmit at Apel Galeri, HOME/ART, Vol. 59, September 2000, p. 20.
- Brill, Joseph A., Hudson Artists Bring American Culture to the Middle of the World, Register-Star, Sunday, September 3, 2000, Front Page & Living Today, pp 1–2.
- Goldson, Elizabeth, Seeing Jazz: Artists and Writers on Jazz, Smithsonian Institution, Chronicle Books, San Francisco, CA, 1999, p. 79, 143 (illus., color)
- Myles, Eileen, Randall Schmit at E.M.Donahue", Art in America, Vol. 82, No 12, December, 1994, pp 104–105.
- Yablonsky, Linda, Randall Schmit, ARTFORUM, Vol XXXIII, No 3, November 1994, p. 88.
- Randall Schmit, The New Yorker, June 10, 1991, p. 17.
- Heartney, Eleanor, Randall Schmit at E.M.Donahue, Art in America, December 1991, pp 117–118.
- Zimmer, William, Collage: New Applications, (catalogue), Lehman College Art Gallery, New York, NY, 1991, p 3.
- Randall Schmit: Absent Hymn Before the Flood, Mudfish 5: Contemporary Art and Poetry, Box Turtle Press, New York, NY 1990, p. 44.
- Bogart, Derek, Gallery Scene: Magazine Street, OFF BEAT, Vol2, No 2, December, 1989.
- Green, Roger, Randall Schmit, The Times-Picayune, New Orleans, Arts & Entertainment Section, p. 2. Sunday, November 12, 1989, p.F-17.
- Rivé, David, Randall Schmit: New Abstractions, The New Orleans Art Review, Vol VI, No4, May/June 1988, p. 4.
- Green, Roger, Randall Schmit, The Times-Picayune, New Orleans, Arts & Entertainment Section, Sunday, May 1, 1988, p. 2.
- Brenson, Michael, Critic’s Choices, The New York Times, Sunday, July 26, 1987.
- Vetrocq, Marcia E., Randall Schmit at Tilden-Foley, Art in America, No 1, January, 1987, p. 145.
- Wallace, Kent, Four Shows; Four Hits, Artspeak, Vol VIII, No21, July 1, 1987.
- Behl, Catherine, Schmit: A Sense of Change, The New Orleans Art Review, Vol. 86-87, No 2, November/December 1986, pp 30–31.
- Harlan, Calvin, Peach Blossoms, Mexicans, et al., The New Orleans Art Review, Vol III, No.23, March/April/May 1984.
- Green, Roger, Randall Schmit, The Times-Picayune, New Orleans, Arts & Entertainment Section, Sunday, April 8, 1984, Section 3, p. 8.
- Glade, Luba, Randall Schmit, GAMBIT, New Orleans, LA, April 14, 1984, p. 27.
