= Francis Bicknell Carpenter =

American painter (1830–1900)

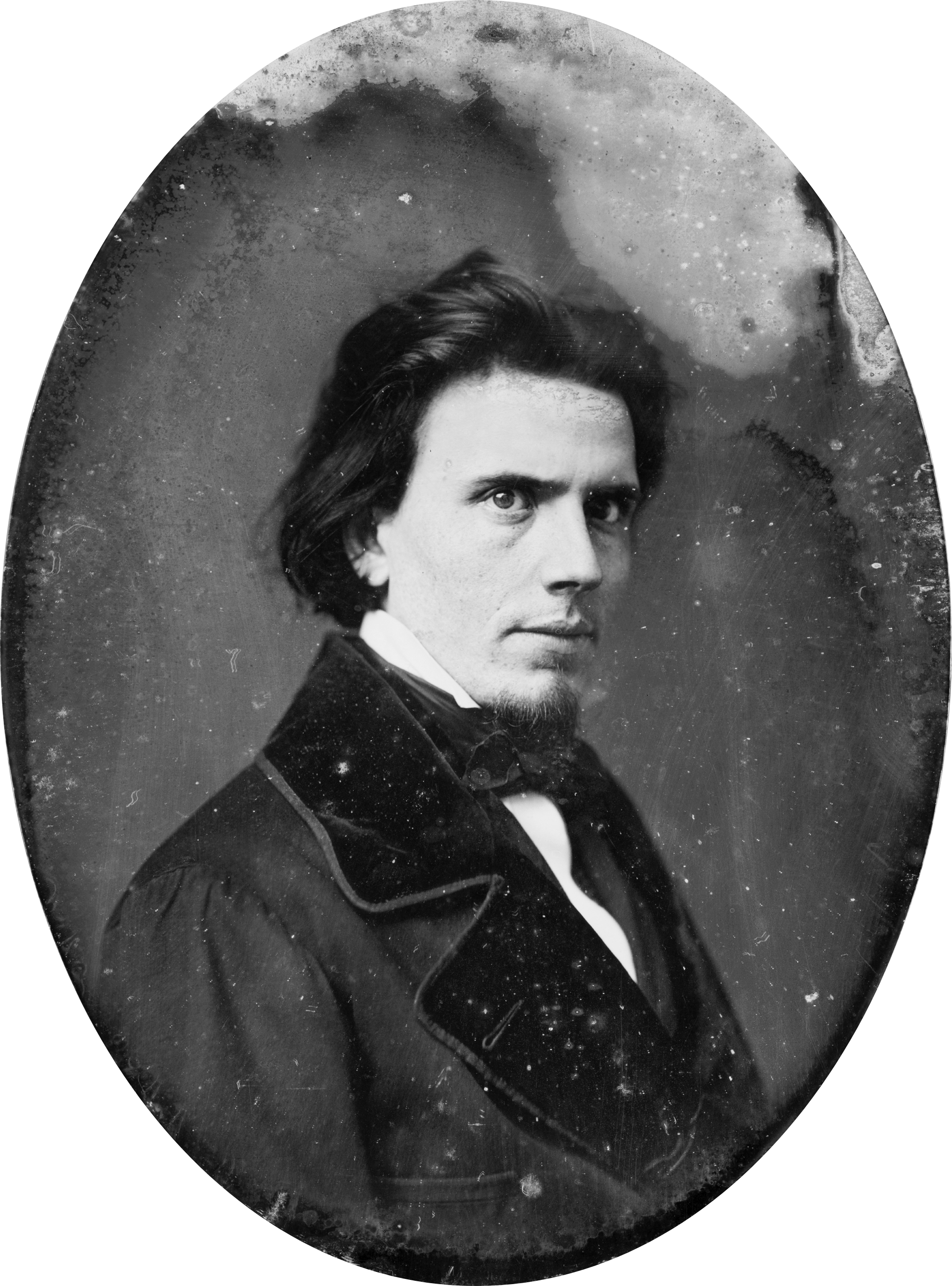
- Daguerreotype by Mathew Brady c. 1850s
- Born: August 6, 1830; Homer, Cortland County, New York
- Died: May 23, 1900 (aged 69)
- Education: Sanford Thayer
- Known for: Painting
- Notable work: 1852 to 1896 Presidential portraits & other notables

Francis Bicknell Carpenter (August 6, 1830 – May 23, 1900) was an American painter born in Homer, New York. Carpenter is best known for his painting First Reading of the Emancipation Proclamation of President Lincoln, which is hanging in the United States Capitol. Carpenter resided with President Lincoln at the White House and in 1866 published his one-volume memoir Six Months at the White House with Abraham Lincoln. Carpenter was a descendant of the New England Rehoboth Carpenter family.

== Family ==
Carpenter was born to Asaph Harmon and Almira Clark (1801–1885). He was one of nine children.

On January 6, 1853, Francis married Augusta Herrick Prentiss (1831–1926). Francis and Augusta had the following children:

- Florence Trumbell Carpenter was born on March 10, 1854, in Homer, Cortland County, NY. She died on December 30, 1899. She is number 6550 in the Carpenter Memorial on page 645. Florence married Albert Chester Ives on May 12, 1877, in New York. Albert was born about 1854 in Buffalo, NY.
- Herbert Sanford Carpenter was born on May 22, 1862, in Homer, Cortland, NY. He is number 6551 in the Carpenter Memorial on page 645. Family on page 654 (# 1478). Herbert married Cora Anderson on February 13, 1894, in NY. Cora was born in Louisville, KY in 1863. She was active in the women's suffrage movement, marching in NYC suffrage demonstrations as a flagbearer from 1913 to 1917. Herbert died in 1926; Cora lived until 1960.

== Education ==
In 1844, after showing his father a painting of his mother that the former viewed as a success, Carpenter was allowed to go to Syracuse, New York, for six months to study under Sanford Thayer. In 1848, at age 18, he was awarded a purchase prize by the American Art-Union. By the age of twenty-one, Carpenter established a studio in New York City. Carpenter was elected to the National Academy of Design as an associate member in 1852.

== Early career ==
In 1852, Carpenter was commissioned to paint a portrait of President Millard Fillmore, a fellow upstate New Yorker born in Cayuga County. Commissions followed for portraits of Presidents Franklin Pierce and John Tyler, and other mid-19th century notables, including the clergyman Henry Ward Beecher; newspaper editor Horace Greeley; Ezra Cornell, founder of Cornell University; James Russell Lowell, poet; and John C. Frémont, the first Republican presidential candidate.

== First Reading of the Emancipation Proclamation of President Lincoln ==
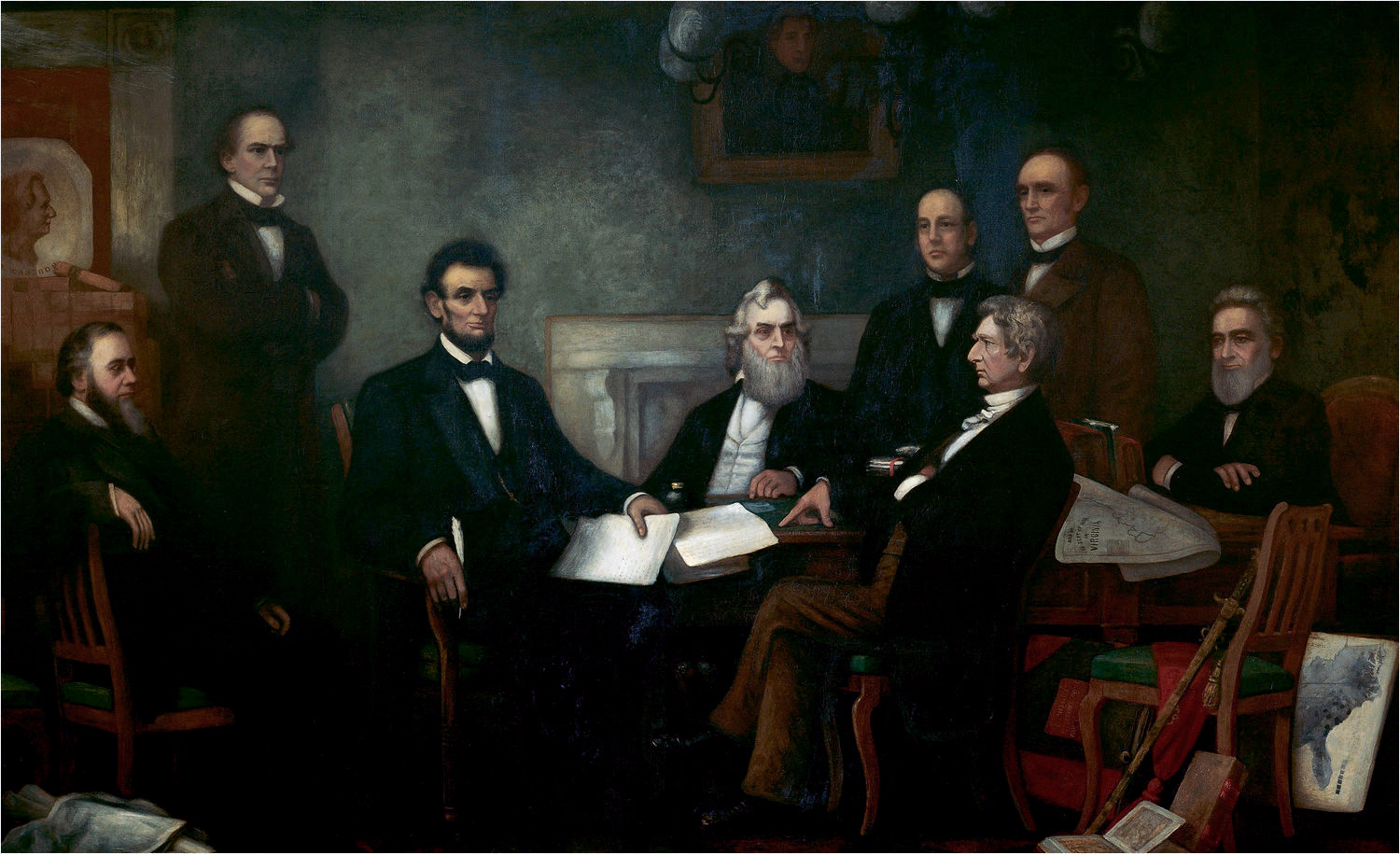
First Reading of the Emancipation Proclamation of President Lincoln by Francis Bicknell Carpenter (People in the image are clickable.)

According to his memoir, Six Months at the White House with Abraham Lincoln, Carpenter was deeply moved by Abraham Lincoln's Emancipation Proclamation, calling it "an act unparalleled for moral grandeur in the history of mankind." Carpenter felt "an intense desire to do something expressive of appreciation of the great issues involved in the war." Carpenter, having formulated his idea for the subject of the painting and outlined its composition, fortuitously met Frederick A. Lane, a friend who recently had earned a large amount of money. Bankrolled by Lane, and through the influence of Samuel Sinclair of the New York Tribune and Representative Schuyler Colfax of Indiana, Carpenter gained Lincoln's assent to travel to Washington and work with him on the painting. Carpenter met with the President on February 6, 1864, and then began work.

Carpenter began with many sketches of Cabinet members and of Lincoln himself, working from life, as Lincoln worked, and from photographs taken by Mathew Brady of Lincoln and members of his Cabinet. Carpenter was given free access to Lincoln's White House office for the former purpose, and the State Dining Room was given him for a studio. On July 12, 1864, Lincoln led his cabinet into the State Dining Room to view the completed work.

When Lincoln had the painting exhibited to the public in the East Room of the White House, Carpenter noted that the exhibition was thronged with visitors. Carpenter campaigned for Congress to purchase the painting, enlisting the help of fellow Homer native William O. Stoddard, Lincoln's private secretary. Congress did not appropriate the money. The painting remained in Carpenter's possession until 1877, when he arranged for Elizabeth Thompson to purchase it for $25,000 and donate it to Congress. A joint session of Congress was held in 1878, on Lincoln's birthday, to serve as a reception for the painting, with the artist present.

== Later career and death ==
Carpenter created an array of artwork depicting Lincoln and his family. In the wake of Lincoln's assassination, Carpenter published a book in 1866 titled Six Months at The White House with Abraham Lincoln. The book details Carpenter's time living in the White House, as well as his personal relationship with Lincoln and other politicians such as William Seward, Edwin Stanton and Ulysses S. Grant.

Among the notable portraits painted by Carpenter, aside from Lincoln, were those of President Fillmore and Governor Myron H. Clarke, painted in the New York City Hall; Horace Greeley (a portrait owned by the Tribune Association); Asa Packer, founder of Lehigh University; James Russell Lowell; New York banker David Leavitt; Dr. Lyman Beecher; Henry Ward Beecher and others.

By the late 1870s, Carpenter became increasingly interested in religion and spirituality; art historian Mary Bartlett Cowdrey believed "that religious obsession somehow undermined Carpenter's work". Carpenter died in New York City—a brief obituary appearing in The New York Times misstated the title of his most famous work.

Carpenter died of "dropsy" an old-fashioned term for edema on May 23, 1900, in New York and was buried in Glenwood Cemetery, Homer, Cortland County, New York.

== Criticism and later exhibitions of Carpenter's work ==
Carpenter's legacy has been decidedly mixed, according to a retrospective of Carpenter's career written for the American Art Journal. Cowdrey attempted a full-scale biography that might have helped his reputation, but became frustrated by lack of interest on the part of Carpenter's family. Contemporary critic Henry T. Tuckerman acknowledged Carpenter's "facility in capturing a likeness" but "criticized the artist's lack of 'grace' and 'vitality'". The United States Senate Catalogue of Fine Art observes that First Reading, as it hangs today in the Capitol, contains a much weaker portrait of Lincoln than the engraving made from it. This is due to Carpenter's obsessive tinkering with the original painting while he had it in his possession.

In 2006, an exhibition of portraits by Carpenter was shown at the Center for the Arts in Homer, New York. Portraits by Carpenter of several figures of local historical interest were exhibited. Loans of the works were obtained from community members, the Phillips Free Library in Homer, and the Homer Central School District.

== Portrait of Mary Lincoln ==
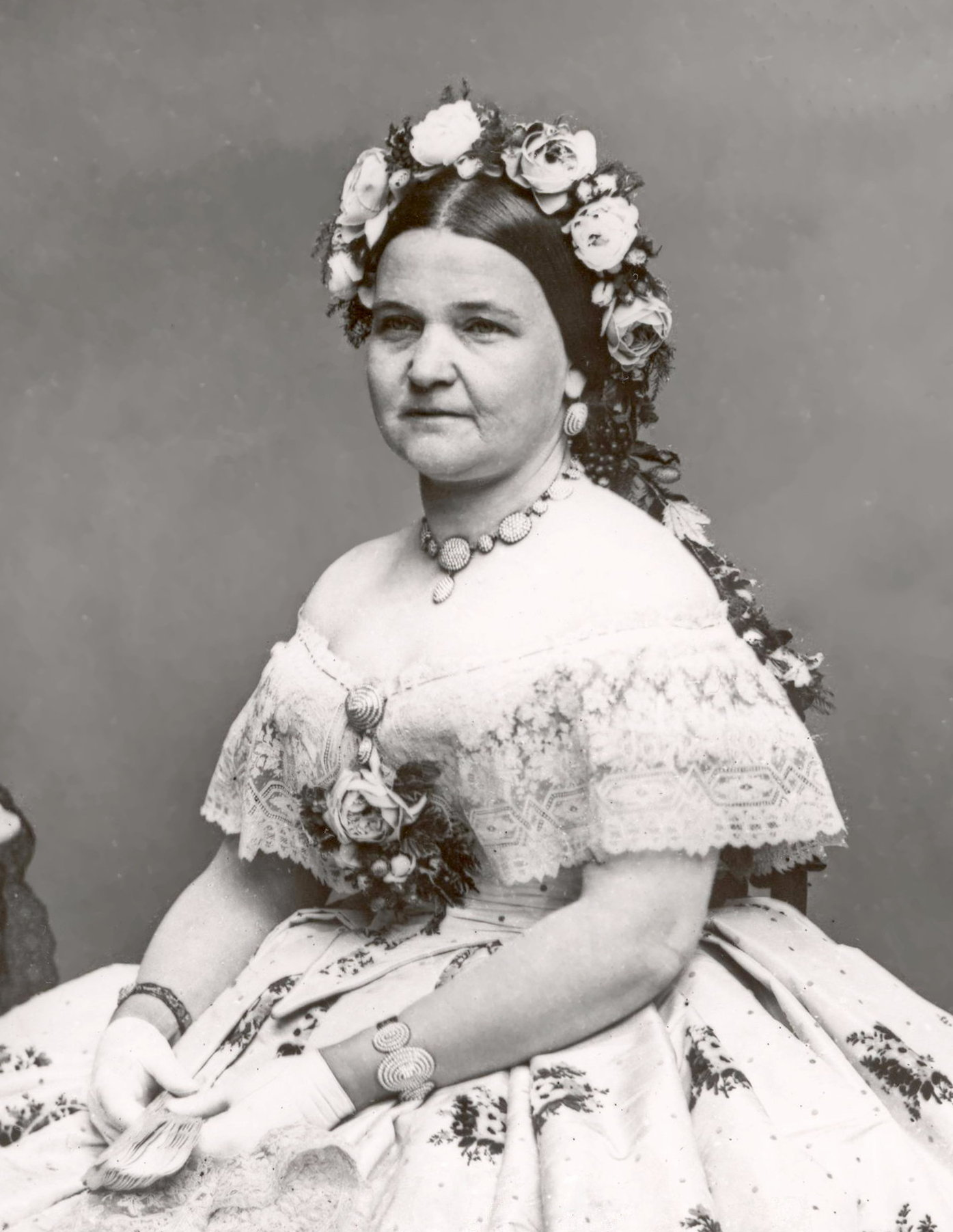
First Lady Mary Todd Lincoln, photographed by Mathew Brady. Compare to the forged portrait here.

On February 12, 1929, The New York Times reported the discovery of a new painting of Mary Lincoln. It reported that this painting was by Francis Bicknell Carpenter. This painting was reproduced in different biographies and books such as Mary Lincoln: Wife and Widow by Carl Sandburg, printed in 1932.

The owner, Ludwig Pflum (aka Lew Bloom), sold it through the Milch Galleries in New York. It was acquired by Jessie Harlan Lincoln, the President's and Mary Lincoln's granddaughter. There is no record of what the painting sold for. Pflum, a former vaudeville performer who dabbled in painting on the side, as Lew Bloom, claimed the painting of Mary Lincoln had not yet been presented and done in secret at the bequest of Mrs. Lincoln by the painter Francis Carpenter. After the assassination of President Lincoln, Bloom claimed Mrs. Lincoln refused it and the painting was sold to a Philadelphia shipbuilder, Jacob G. Neafi. Bloom also claimed that after the death of Mrs. Neafie, Mr. Neafie gave the painting to Susan Bloom for her kindness and caring for Mrs. Neafie through her long illness. Bloom went on to claim that he inherited the painting from his sister after her death in 1910. As it turns out, Susan Bloom was five years old when Mrs. Neafie died in 1860.

This painting remained in the Lincoln family until 1976, later estimated at a value of about $400,000 US dollars, when it was given to the Illinois State Historical Library, now named the Abraham Lincoln Presidential Library and Museum. During a 2011 restoration by art conservator Barry Bauman, it was found to be a forgery. The forgery overpainted an original oil portrait of an unknown woman, painted circa the 1860s, that was modified by painting out a crucifix, adding an Abraham Lincoln brooch with other adjustments such as forging Francis Bicknell Carpenter's signature. Bauman is quoted to say, "Not only is it not Mary Lincoln, it's not Francis Carpenter."
