= Lew Bloom =

American actor and art collector (1859–1929)

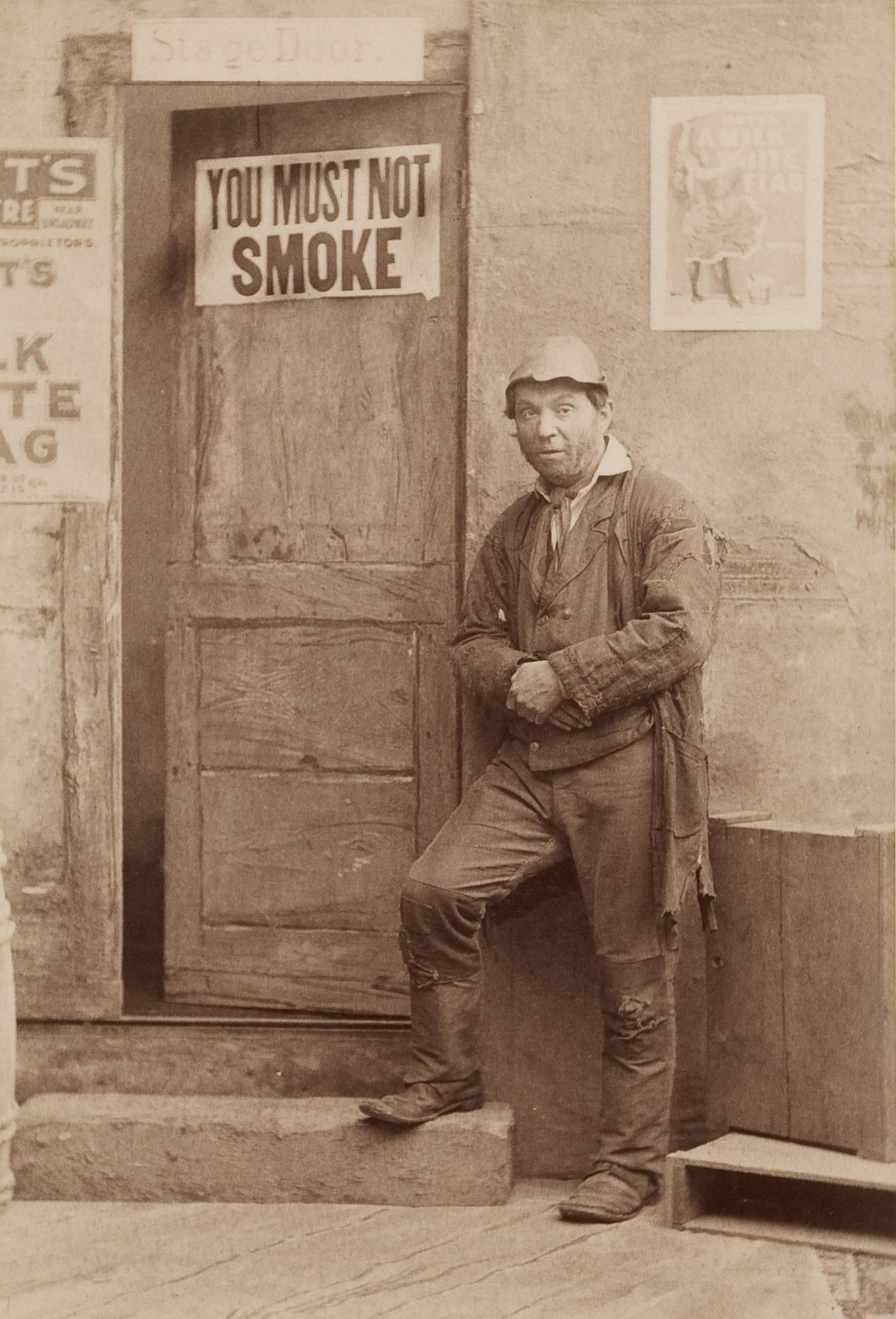
- Bloom as his "tramp" character
- Born: Ludwig Pflum; August 8, 1859; Philadelphia, Pennsylvania, U.S.
- Died: December 12, 1929 (aged 70); Manhattan, New York City, U.S.
- Resting place: Charles Evans Cemetery
- Other name: Bud Bloom
- Education: Poplar Street School
- Occupations: Vaudeville performer, art collector, art dealer, painter
- Spouse: Jane Cooper (m. 1892)

Lew Bloom (born Ludwig Pflum; August 8, 1859 – December 12, 1929) was an American vaudeville performer and stage actor who popularized the comical tramp character. After retiring from the stage in the 1910s, he became a prolific art collector and dealer and also painted his own original works.

Decades after his death, art conservators discovered that Bloom was the perpetrator of an art forgery involving an oil portrait that he claimed depicted First Lady Mary Todd Lincoln.

== Early life ==
Bloom was born Ludwig Pflum in Philadelphia, Pennsylvania, to Ludwig and Louisa (née Moyer) Pflum. His parents, who immigrated from Germany, had six other children: Susannah, Susan Deborah, Louisa, Charles, Edward and Adolph (who died as a child). Bloom's father worked as a cooper. The family eventually moved to Reading, Pennsylvania, where Bloom attended Poplar Street School. Around 1871, the family moved to Williamsburg where Bloom began working as a jockey. In 1873, he joined the Potter Hart Colossus Circus where he performed a "bounding jockey act" in which he rode horses and performed acrobatics. During his time at the circus, "Ludwig Pflum" changed his name to "Lew Bloom" and would use that name for the remainder of his performing career.

== Career ==
=== Early years ===
Bloom spent several years touring in variety shows with his jockey act before relocating to Dover, Delaware, where he competed in horse match races. He then returned to Reading where he and a friend opened the Drovers' Hotel. The establishment was the first to introduce cabaret to Reading. Bloom performed song and dance acts at the hotel and also began competing as a lightweight boxer.

Bloom later became the stage manager for his friend's second establishment, The General Taylor Hotel. He left after two years to work as a clown in the Shelby, Pullman & Hamilton Circus. After a year, Bloom returned to Reading where formed a partnership with vaudevillian Howard Monroe. The duo performed song and dance numbers and comedy skits in blackface until Bloom left the duo and went to New York to perform comedy as a solo act.

=== Stage and vaudeville ===
In 1885, Bloom was cast in the play Nobody's Claim, followed by a role in The Red Spider in 1888. It was his role in the latter production where he first conceived of the tramp persona.

Bloom's "Society Tramp" character was a philosophical, shabbily dressed homeless man who drank frequently and was generally treated poorly by other characters. Despite his lowly status, the tramp would make light of his predicament and maintained a positive and comicial outlook. Typically, tramp characters like Bloom's included slapstick comedy routines as well as dancing or pantomime. One of Bloom's tramp character's jokes was, "I don't spend all my time in saloons. I can't. They have to close up some time."

Bloom's tramp character became a big hit with audiences and was quickly copied by hundreds of other performers of the era including Nat M. Wills and Charles R. Sweet. Charlie Chaplin and W. C. Fields also established long and successful stage and film careers portraying their version of the tramp persona. Bloom would later insist he originated the character and that he was "the first stage tramp in the business".

Bloom's stage career peaked in the 1890s. Throughout the decade, he continued to portray tramps in various stage productions by Charles Hale Hoyt including A Black Sheep, On the Bowery, A Milk White Flag, A Day and a Night and A Society Tramp. After leaving Hoyt in 1892, Bloom and his wife (whom he married in 1892), known as "Miss Jane Cooper", toured the vaudeville circuit with their comedy act "A Picture of Life". Bloom played his usual tramp role while his wife played the comic foil - a "New England spinster" or a "city maiden."

By 1909, Bloom's tramp persona had run its course and his career began to wane. At least one critic during that time said that Bloom had become "the worst act on the bill" of vaudeville shows.

== Later years ==
After retiring from performing in the late 1910s, Bloom lived in Mount Penn, Pennsylvania, where he spent his time painting in his studio and collecting and dealing art. He began purchasing artwork during his stage career. Between 1889 and 1892, he purchased thirty to forty paintings from artist Ralph Albert Blakelock. Upon his sister Susan's death in 1910, he inherited her art collection. In April 1907, Bloom exhibited seven pieces of his original works at the Reinhard Rieger Gallery in Mount Penn. The exhibition also included a copy of The Brooklet In the Meadow, by Herman Rheudesela that Bloom painted (the original painting was also exhibited). Bloom later moved to New York and occasionally returned to his hometown of Reading to spend time with his family and attend Elks Club meetings. He also trained horses for Metropolitan Race Clubs in the New York and Pennsylvania area and in Cuba.

== Death ==
On December 10, 1929, Bloom was admitted to Bellevue Hospital in Manhattan, New York City. He died there two days later of "complication of diseases" at the age of 70. Bloom's funeral was held at the Seidel Funeral Chapel in Reading on December 16. He was buried at Charles Evans Cemetery the following morning.

== Mary Todd Lincoln hoax ==
In early 1929, Bloom made news when he announced that he had acquired a previously unknown oil portrait of former First Lady Mary Todd Lincoln, the widow of slain president Abraham Lincoln. Bloom claimed shortly before President Lincoln was assassinated on April 14, 1865, Mary Lincoln commissioned painter Francis Bicknell Carpenter (who had lived at the White House for six months during Lincoln's presidency and had previously painted First Reading of the Emancipation Proclamation of President Lincoln) to paint a portrait of her as gift to her husband. After the President's death, Bloom claimed that Mary Lincoln was unable to pay Carpenter for the painting and asked him to destroy it. According to Bloom, Carpenter kept the painting and eventually sold it to a wealthy Philadelphia shipbuilder named Jacob G. Neafie who was a great fan of President Lincoln's. After Neafie died, Bloom said that Neafie's daughter inherited the portrait who then gave it to Bloom's sister Susan as gift for taking care of her mother, Anna "Annie" Neafie, who died in 1860. Upon Susan's death in 1910, Bloom inherited her art collection which he said included the portrait of Mary Lincoln.

To validate his claim of the portrait's authenticity, Bloom attached a notarized affidavit to it and displayed the portrait at Milch Galleries in Manhattan. Shortly before his death in December 1929, he sold the portrait to president and Mary Lincoln's granddaughter Jessie Harlan Lincoln, the daughter of the Lincolns' eldest and only surviving son Robert Todd Lincoln. The exact sale price is unknown, but is believed to be between $2,000 to $3,000 (approximately $38,000 to $56,000 today). The portrait was the subject of considerable media attention and was written about in the February 12, 1929 edition of the New York Times and the Chicago Tribune. It was later mentioned in various books about the Lincolns, including Carl Sandburg's 1932 biography Mary Lincoln: Wife and Widow.

In 1976, Robert Todd Lincoln Beckwith, the last undisputed Lincoln descendant, donated the portrait to the Illinois State Historical Library (now known as the Abraham Lincoln Presidential Library and Museum). At the time, the portrait was estimated to be worth $400,000 (approximately $7,500,000 today). In 1978, art conservators at the Art Institute of Chicago noted that the portrait had been "heavily retouched" and contained significant elements that were added after the original painting had been completed. After a partial restoration, it was discovered that the facial area of the subject had been altered. The woman in the portrait was noted to have coloring that was brighter than the original 1929 portrait and that the face of the woman was "different, plainer" than Mary Todd Lincoln's. The conservators also discovered that the subject was wearing a cross necklace which Mary Lincoln would not have worn as she was not a Roman Catholic. As the painting had been owned by the Lincoln family, the authenticity of the painting was not immediately questioned. The conservators that worked on the initial restoration reasoned that the added paint was likely the result of "heavy handed" retouches by other conservators or by Francis Bicknell Carpenter who was known to "fiddle with" his finished paintings. The lack of resemblance to the woman in the portrait to the real Mary Lincoln was rationalized as "artistic idealization". For the next 32 years, the portrait hung at the Illinois Executive Mansion in Springfield, Illinois.

In April 2010, art conservator Barry Bauman was hired to clean the portrait as it had accumulated dirt and grime after years of being displayed. Bauman also hoped to restore the portrait to its previous 1929 appearance. During the restoration, Bauman soon discovered that a layer of varnish sat on top of the paint indicating that someone had altered the original. After removing the varnish, Bauman discovered that the woman Bloom claimed was Mary Todd Lincoln was an unknown woman who bore no resemblance to the former First Lady. It was noted that the woman's coloring was "...much fresher, a much warmer, a much redder toned, flesh toned..." than the original painting depicted. Bauman also discovered that a brooch bearing the face of Abraham Lincoln worn by the subject covered a floral brooch. Bauman also inspected the signature of Francis Bicknell Carpenter and the date, both of which were added on top of the varnish layer. After comparing the signature to Carpenter's other paintings, the signature was deemed a forgery.

After the portrait was completely restored, Bauman determined that while it had been painted in the 1860s (likely around 1864), the woman in the portrait was not Mary Todd Lincoln and the painting was not the work of Francis Bicknell Carpenter. The real subject of the portrait and the artist remain unknown. Bauman also determined that Bloom, who also painted his own works, had likely altered the original portrait himself. Bauman also believed Bloom painted over the original portrait, forged Carpenter's name and created the fake affidavit. Bloom's claim that the portrait was given to his sister Susan by Jacob G. Neafie's daughter in appreciation of her care for the ailing Anna Neafie was proven to be false. Susan Bloom was born in 1855 and was only five years old when Anna Neafie died in 1860. James M. Cornelius, the curator of the Abraham Lincoln Presidential Library and Museum, believes that Bloom was able to pull off the hoax because all the participants in his story were unable to refute his story as they were dead. Cornelius also believes that Bloom sought out the Lincolns not only make money from the sale of the portrait but to legitimatize its authenticity. Bloom was likely aware that the surviving Lincolns were eager to portray Mary and her son Robert Todd Lincoln in a positive and sympathetic light after the family had received a great deal of negative publicity after Robert had his mother forcibly institutionalized in 1875.
