= Ralph Albert Blakelock =

American painter (1847–1919)

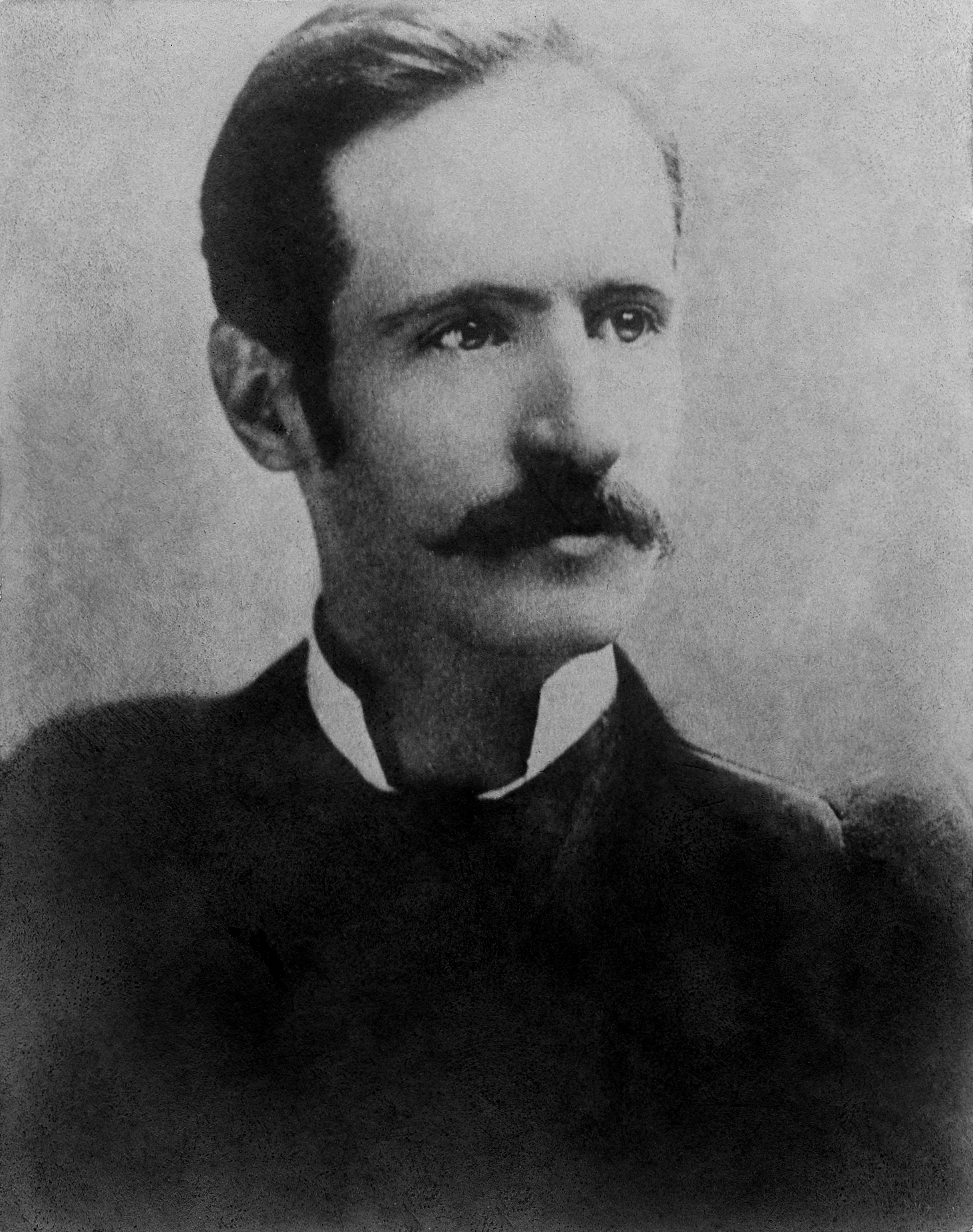
- Ralph Blakelock, 1870
- Born: October 15, 1847; New York City
- Died: August 9, 1919 (aged 71); Elizabethtown, New York
- Education: Largely self taught
- Known for: Painting, Landscape art

Ralph Albert Blakelock (October 15, 1847 – August 9, 1919) was a romanticist American painter known primarily for his landscape paintings related to the Tonalism movement.

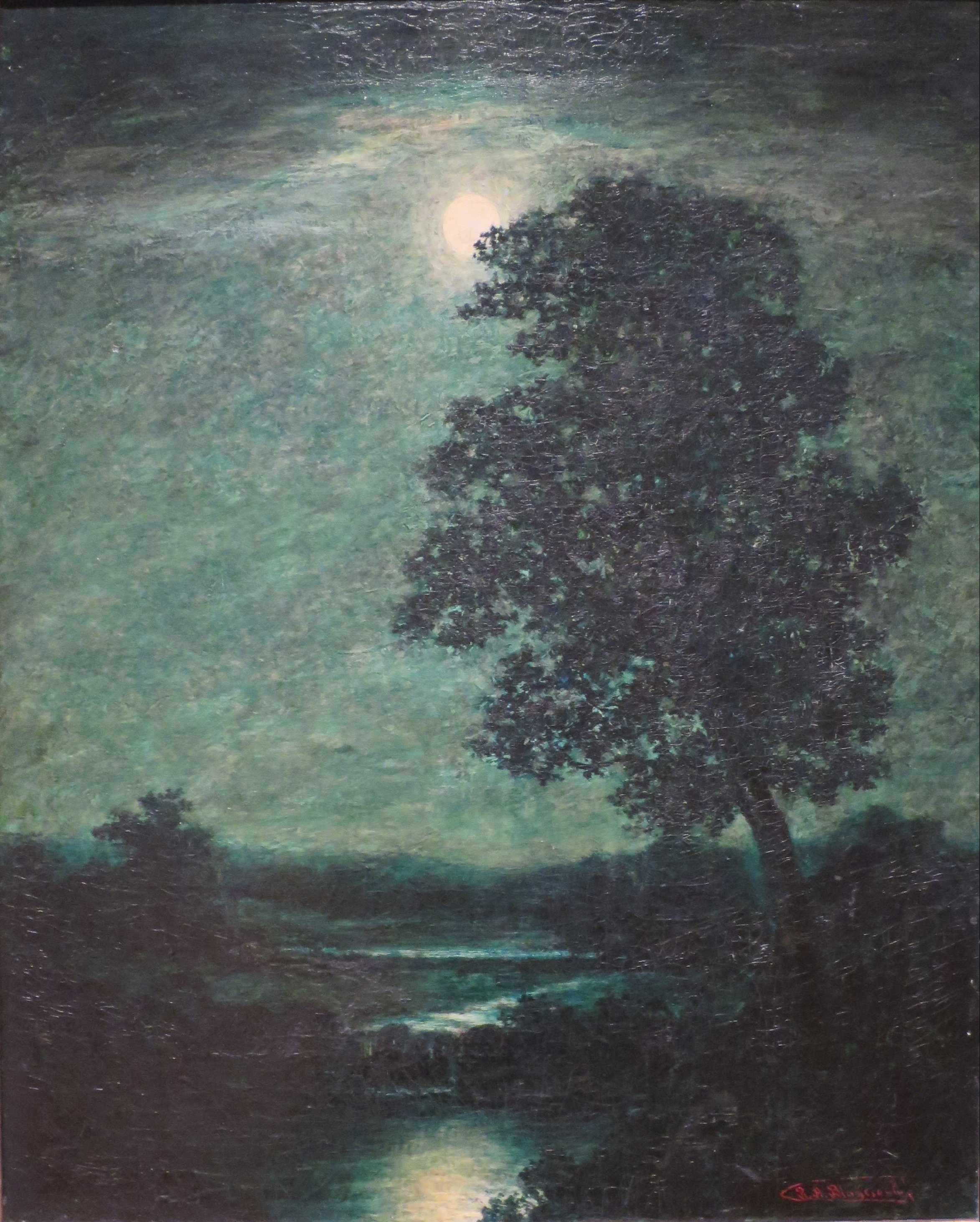
Moonlight, c. 1883–1889, High Museum, Atlanta, Georgia

== Biography ==
Ralph Blakelock was born in New York City on October 15, 1847, the son of Caroline Olinarg (Carry) and Ralph B. Blakelock, who was born in England. His father was a successful physician. Blakelock initially set out to follow in his footsteps, and in 1864 began studies at the Free Academy of the City of New York (now known as the City College). He dropped out after his third term, opting to forgo formal education. From 1869 to 1872 he traveled alone through the American West, wandering far from American settlements and spending time among the American Indians. Largely self-taught as an artist, he began producing competent landscapes, as well as scenes of Indian life, based on his notebooks he filled while traveling and on his personal memories and feelings. Blakelock's works were exhibited in the National Academy of Design.

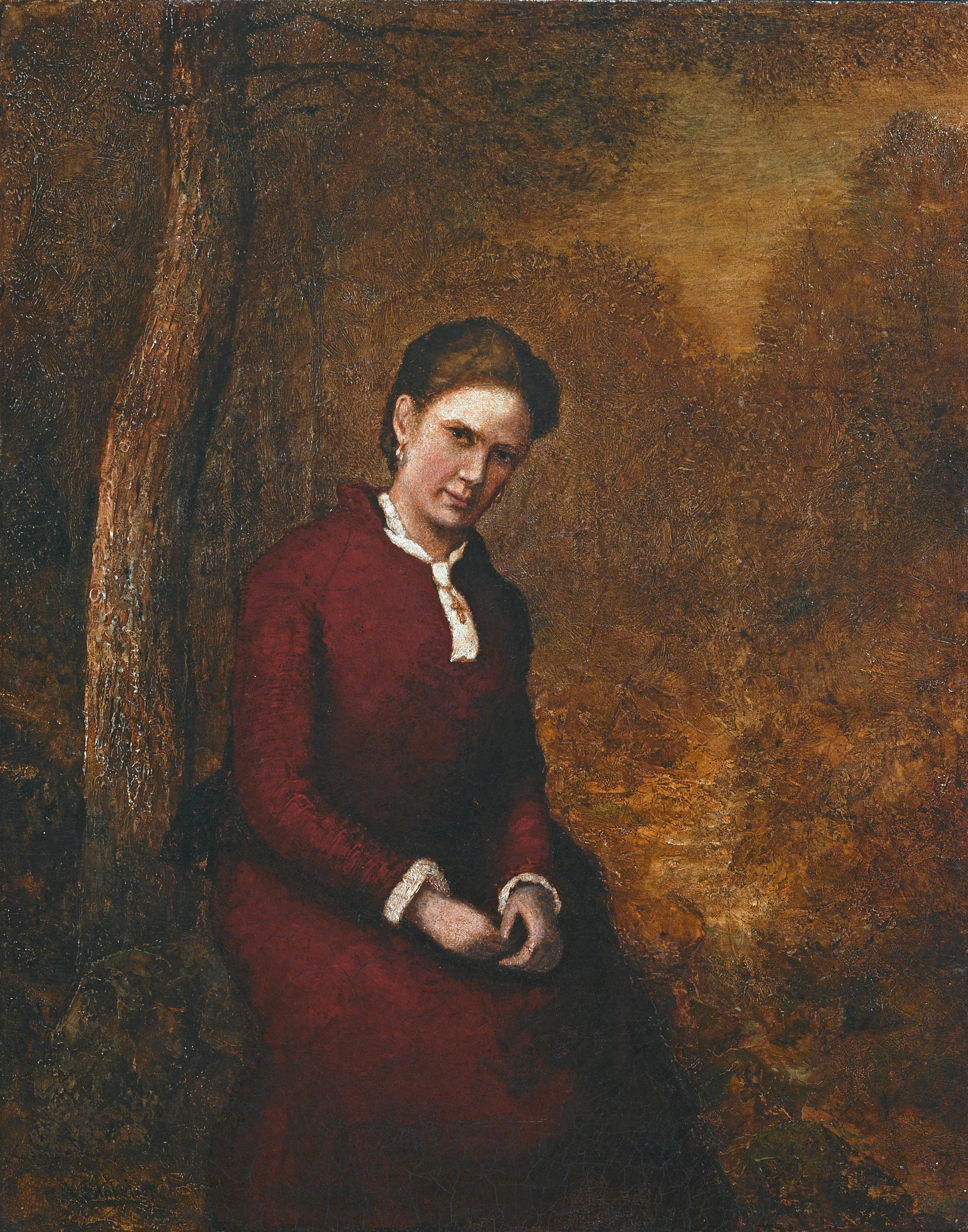
Cora Bailey (c. 1876)

In 1877 Blakelock married Cora Rebecca Bailey; they had nine children. In art, Blakelock was a genius, yet, in business dealings and in monetary transactions he proved a failure. He found it difficult, if not crushing to maintain and support his wife and children. In desperation he found himself selling his paintings for extremely low prices, far beneath their known worth. In hopes of lifting his family from abject poverty, reportedly on the day his 9th child was born, Blakelock had offered a painting to a collector for $1000. The collector made a counter offer and after refusing the proposed sum Blakelock found himself in a bitter argument with his wife. After the domestic dispute, Blakelock returned to the patron and sold the painting for a much lesser sum. Defeated and frustrated, it is said he broke down and tore the cash into pieces. And so it was after such repeated failed business transactions that he began to suffer from extreme depression and eventually show symptoms of mental frailty.

Blakelock suffered his first mental breakdown in 1891, while living with his brother in Greenpoint, Brooklyn. For financial assistance, he began selling his paintings, including 30 to 40 to vaudeville performer Lew Bloom between 1889 and 1892. His depression manifested in schizophrenic delusions in which he believed himself immensely wealthy – perhaps a compensation for his long struggle to provide for his family. In 1899, he suffered his final breakdown and spent almost the entire remaining twenty years of his life in mental institutions.

Almost as soon as Blakelock went into the first psychiatric hospital, his works began to receive recognition. Within a few years the paintings he had once sold for next to nothing were resold for several thousand dollars. In 1916, Blakelock was made an Academician of the National Academy of Design. Meanwhile, Blakelock languished in the mental asylum of Middletown State Homeopathic Hospital, whose administration and staff were unaware of his fame as an artist, and who viewed his belief that his paintings were in major museums as one more sign of his illness. While confined he continued to paint in ink, painting on the backs of cardboard and various supports, substituting bark and his own hair for brushes.

In 1916, one of Blakelock's landscapes sold at auction for $20,000, setting a record for a painting by a living American artist. It was this impressive price that captured the imagination of Sadie Filbert, who had reinvented herself as the socially prominent Beatrice Van Rensselaer Adams so that she could swindle the wealthy by persuading them to donate to charitable causes that would, in fact, serve to enrich herself. She founded and milked the Blakelock Fund, which was supposed to support the impecunious artist and his needy brood. She informed Harrison Smith, then a young reporter with the New York Tribune, of Blakelock's whereabouts, and he went to see Blakelock in the asylum. He found him largely lucid, although under the delusion that an imagined "diamond of the Emperor of Brazil" had been stolen from him. Smith explained to the asylum director who Blakelock was, and managed to arrange to bring Blakelock and the director to Manhattan, where a major gallery retrospective of Blakelock's work was taking place. Blakelock was awed by the changes in the city in the two decades since he had last seen it, and thrilled to see the recognition his work had received. Smith scored himself a major news story. (In a 1945 account, Smith added that Blakelock had quietly informed him that several of the paintings were forgeries, but Smith chose not to put that in his story because of the question of how far he could rely on the word of the less than fully sane Blakelock.) These events led to Blakelock's release from the asylum, in the "care" of Sadie Filbert, alias Beatrice Van Rensselaer Adams, who milked him for all he was worth.

He continued painting until his death at the age of 71 on August 9, 1919.

== Work ==
Blakelock taught himself to paint through trial and error, and continued to use improvisation as an artistic method throughout his life. He was also an accomplished musician, and would use his improvised piano compositions as inspiration for his paintings. He would work on paintings for years, building layers and then scoring, scraping, or rubbing them away.

Blakelock's early landscapes have their genesis in the style of the Hudson River School of painters. In time, he developed a more subjective and intimate style. His favorite themes were those depicting the wilderness and solitude; evocative and emotional paintings of illuminated moments in nature, of moonlight landscapes and twilight hours and Indian camps in the solitude of nature. He was also heavily influenced by the French Barbizon School, whose painters also favored dark forests and heavily worked surfaces. Blakelock's technique was highly personal and through his individualistic style his paintings summoned the viewer into a luminous, almost other worldly realm. In the majority of his paintings, space is given depth by the use of light; moonlight most often. Along with his contemporary Albert Pinkham Ryder, Ralph Albert Blakelock was one of the most individual American painters of his time.

One of his many paintings entitled Moonlight was sold at the highest price ever paid for the work of a living American artist at that time. Sadly, his fame along with the rising sums his work commanded never benefited his family or himself. By 1903 his works were being forged, so much so, that he remains today as "perhaps the most forged" artist in America.

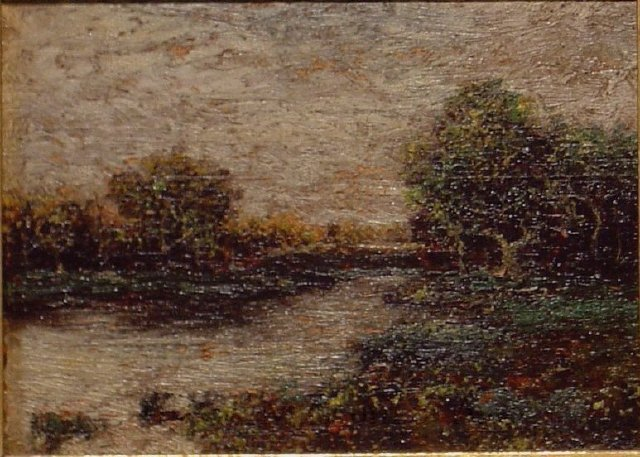
Solitude, 1869, Tucson Museum of Art

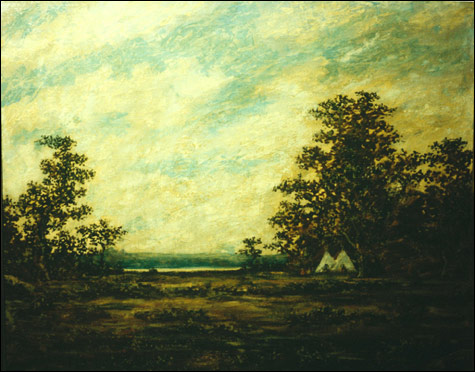
Indian Encampment, 1870, Midwest Museum of American Art

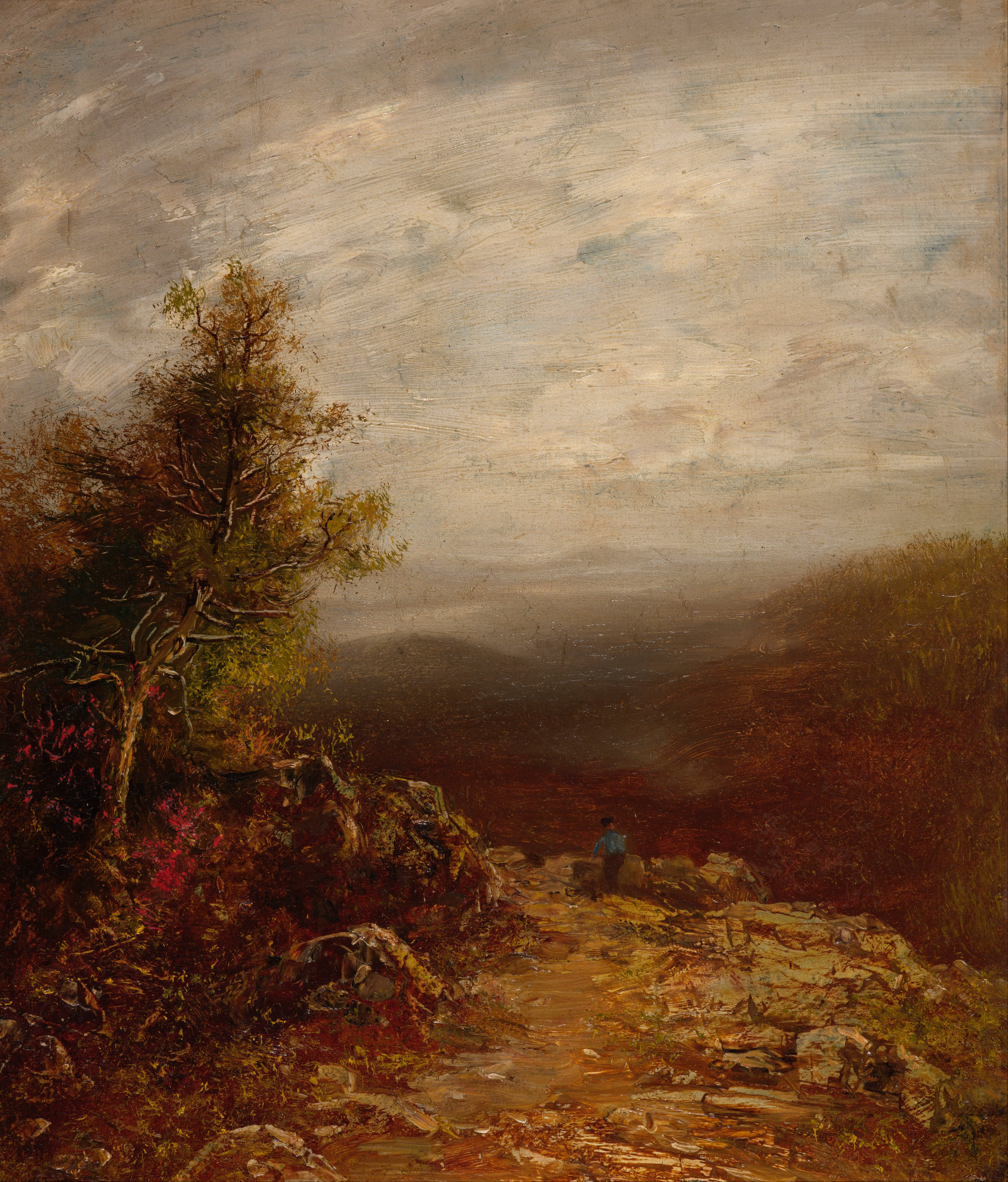
Above the Clouds, c. 1875, Indianapolis Museum of Art

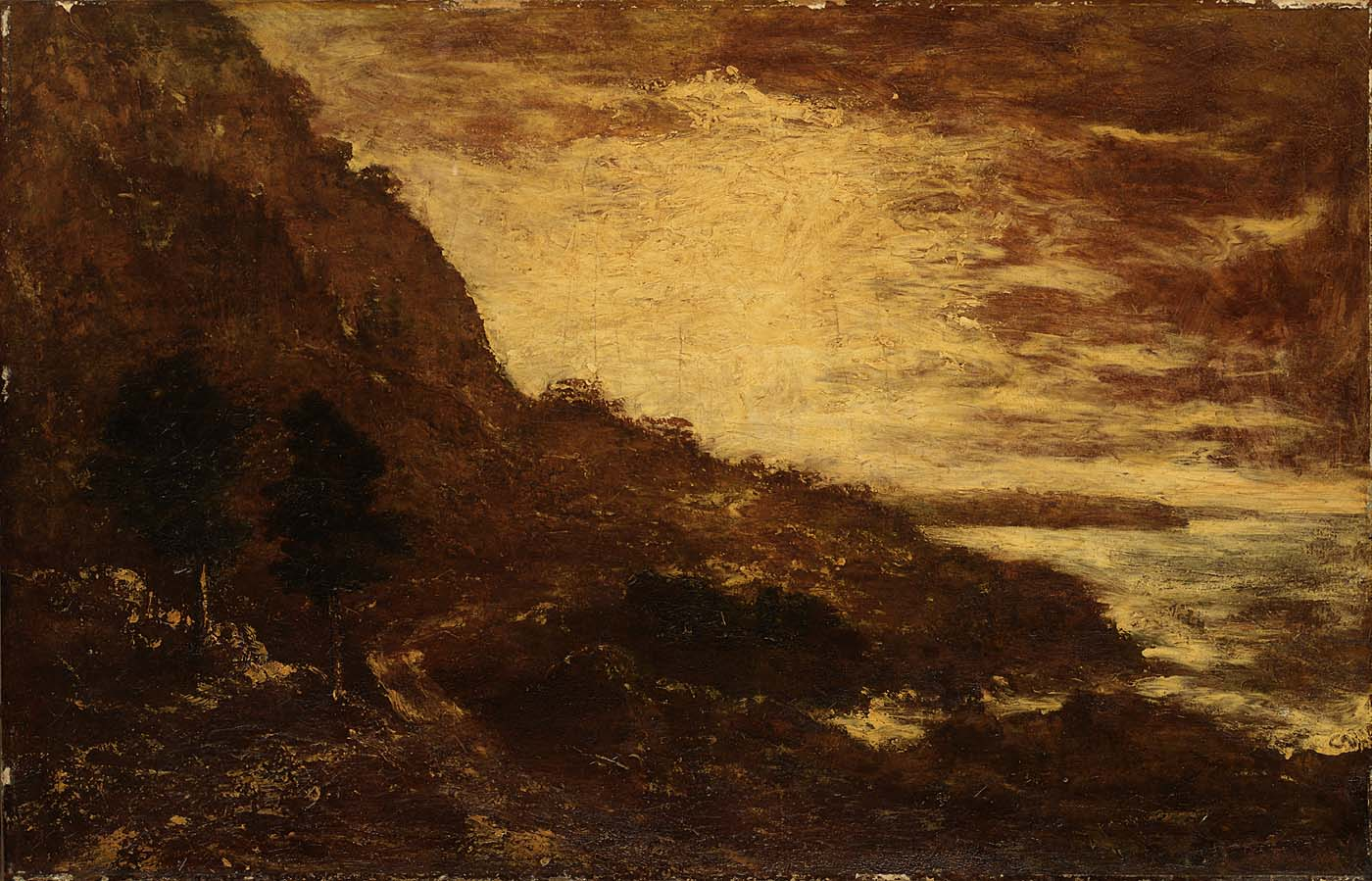
Sunset, Navarro Ridge, California Coast, 1870–1879, Smithsonian American Art Museum

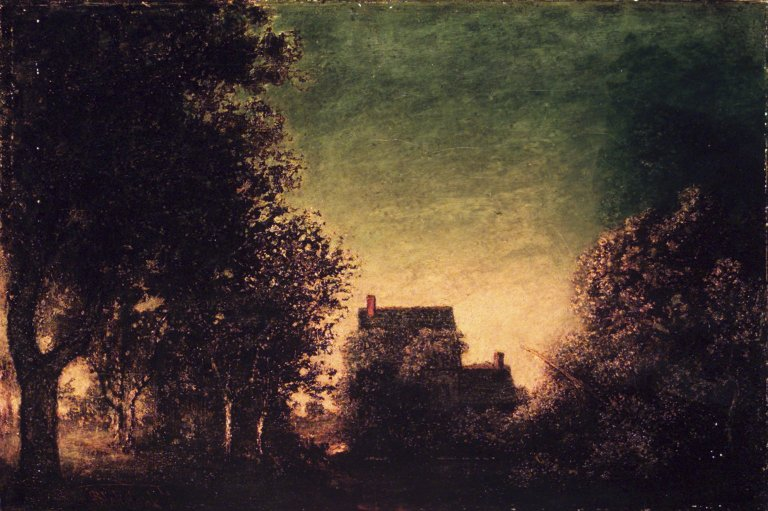
Edge of the Forest, 1880–1890, Brooklyn Museum

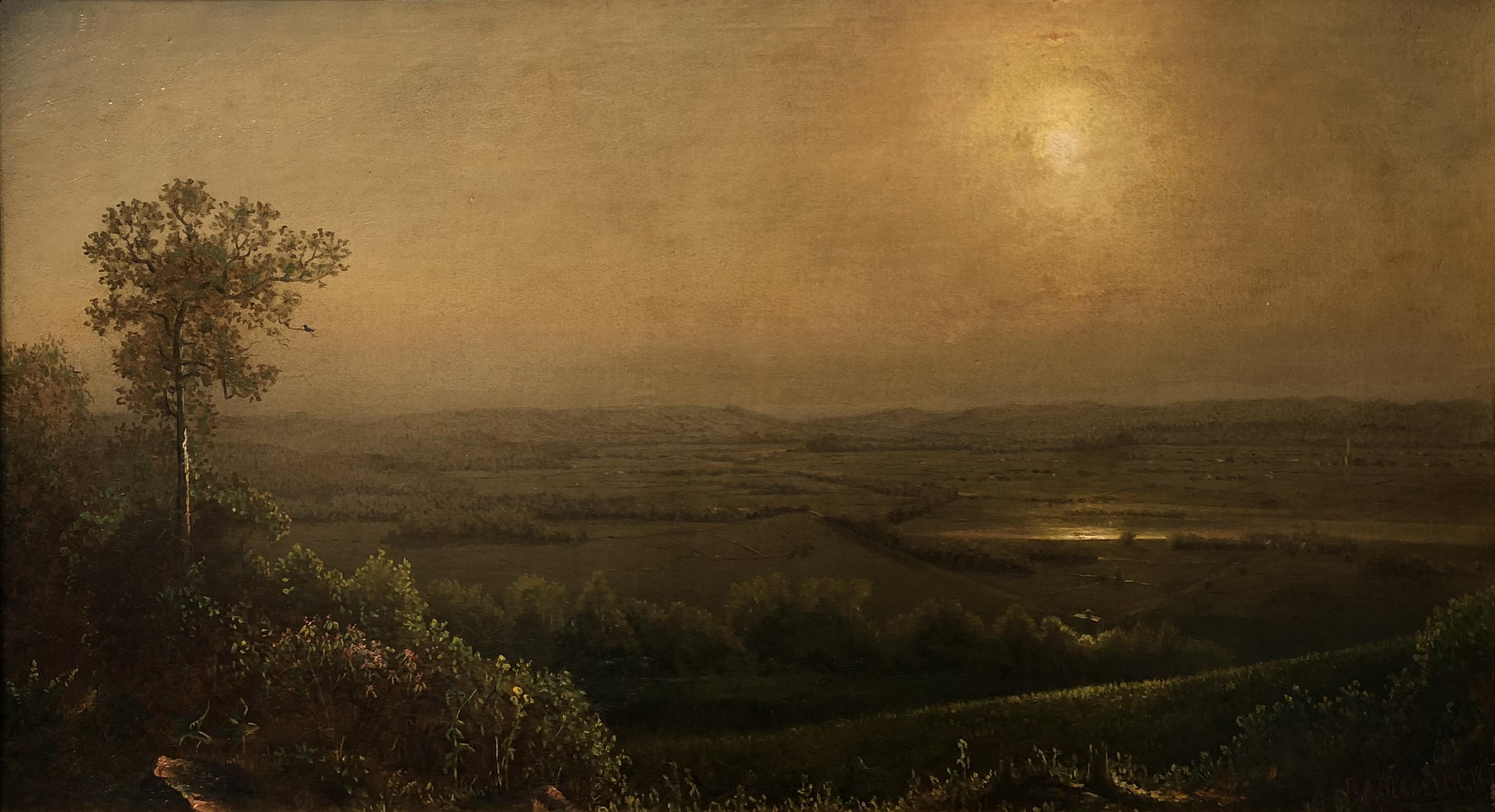
Evening, 1880–1890, Haggin Museum, Stockton

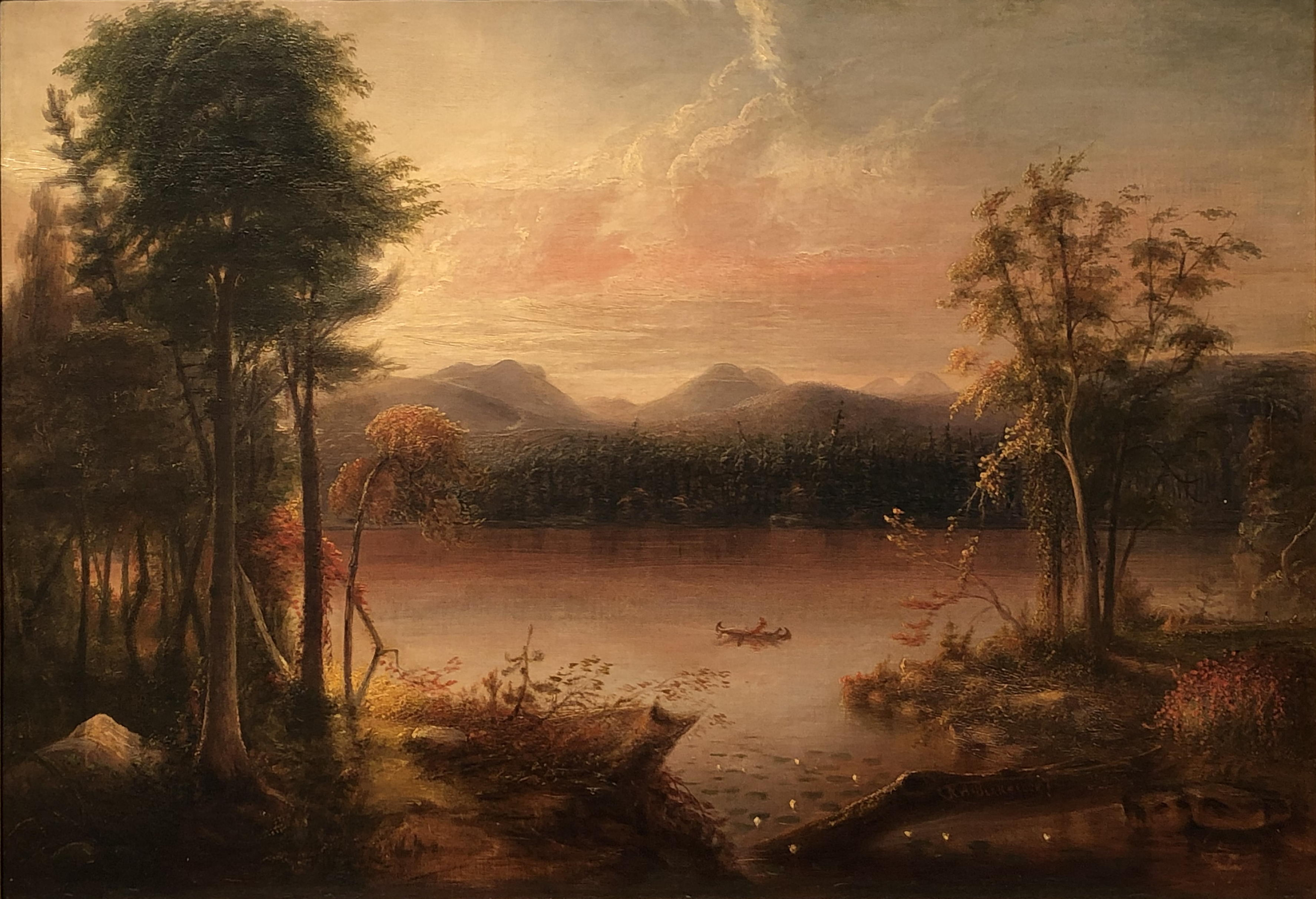
The Canoe, 1880–1890, Haggin Museum, Stockton

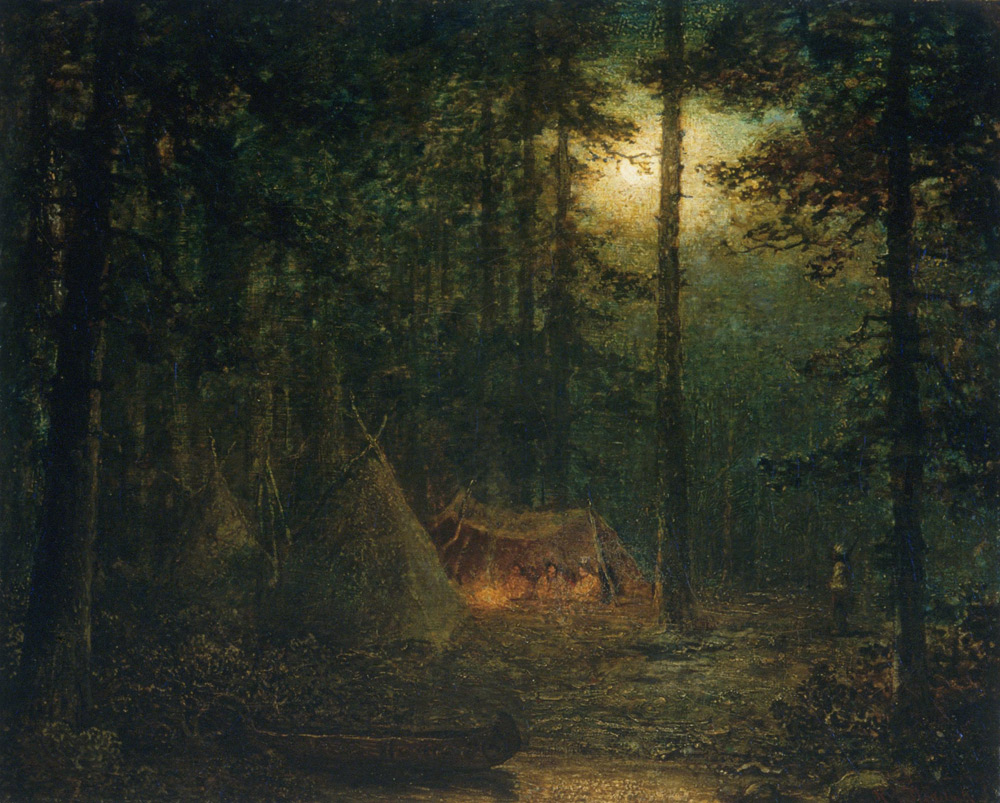
Canadian Indian Hunters, 1881, Herbert F. Johnson Museum of Art

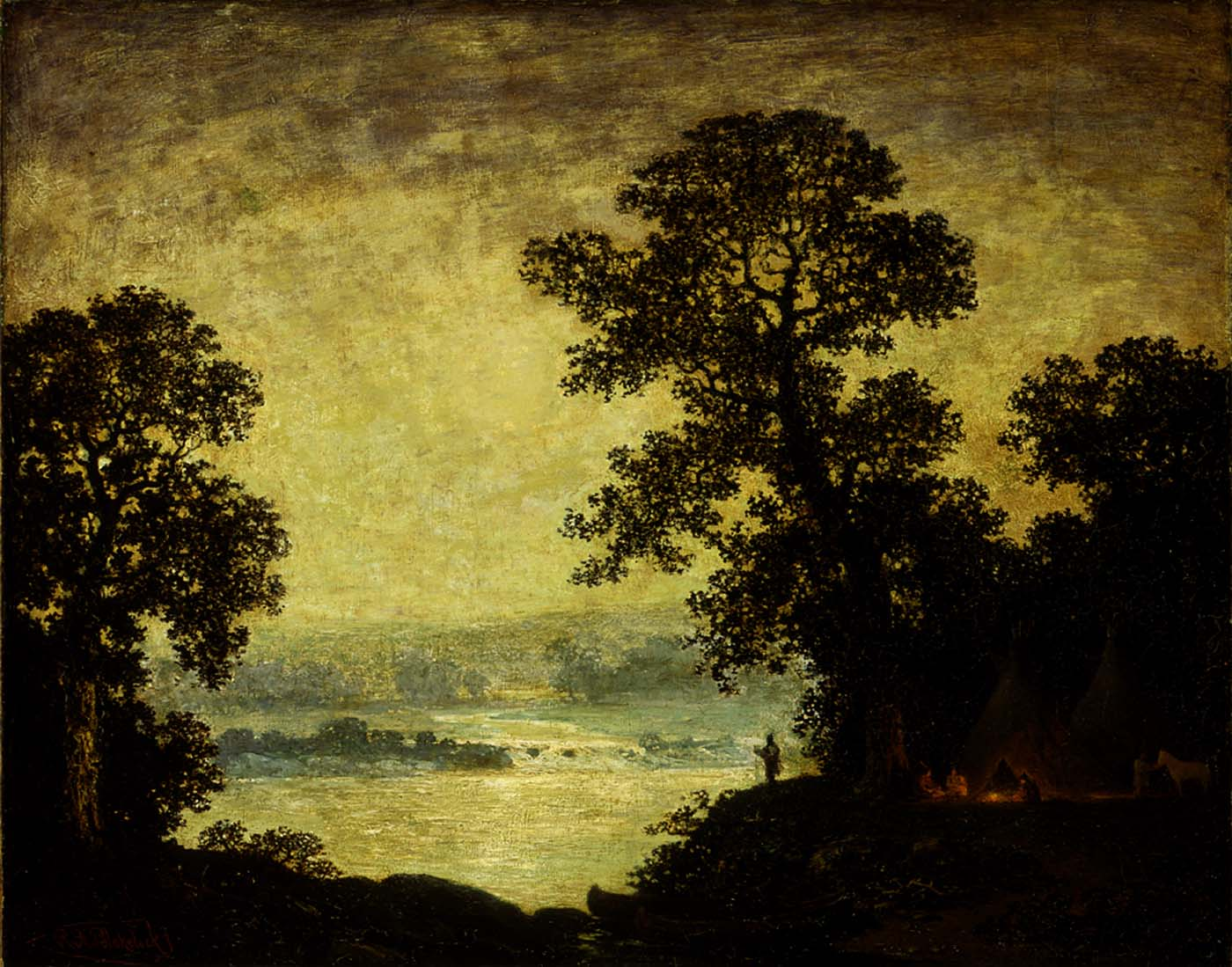
Moonlight, Indian Encampment, 1885–1890, Smithsonian American Art Museum

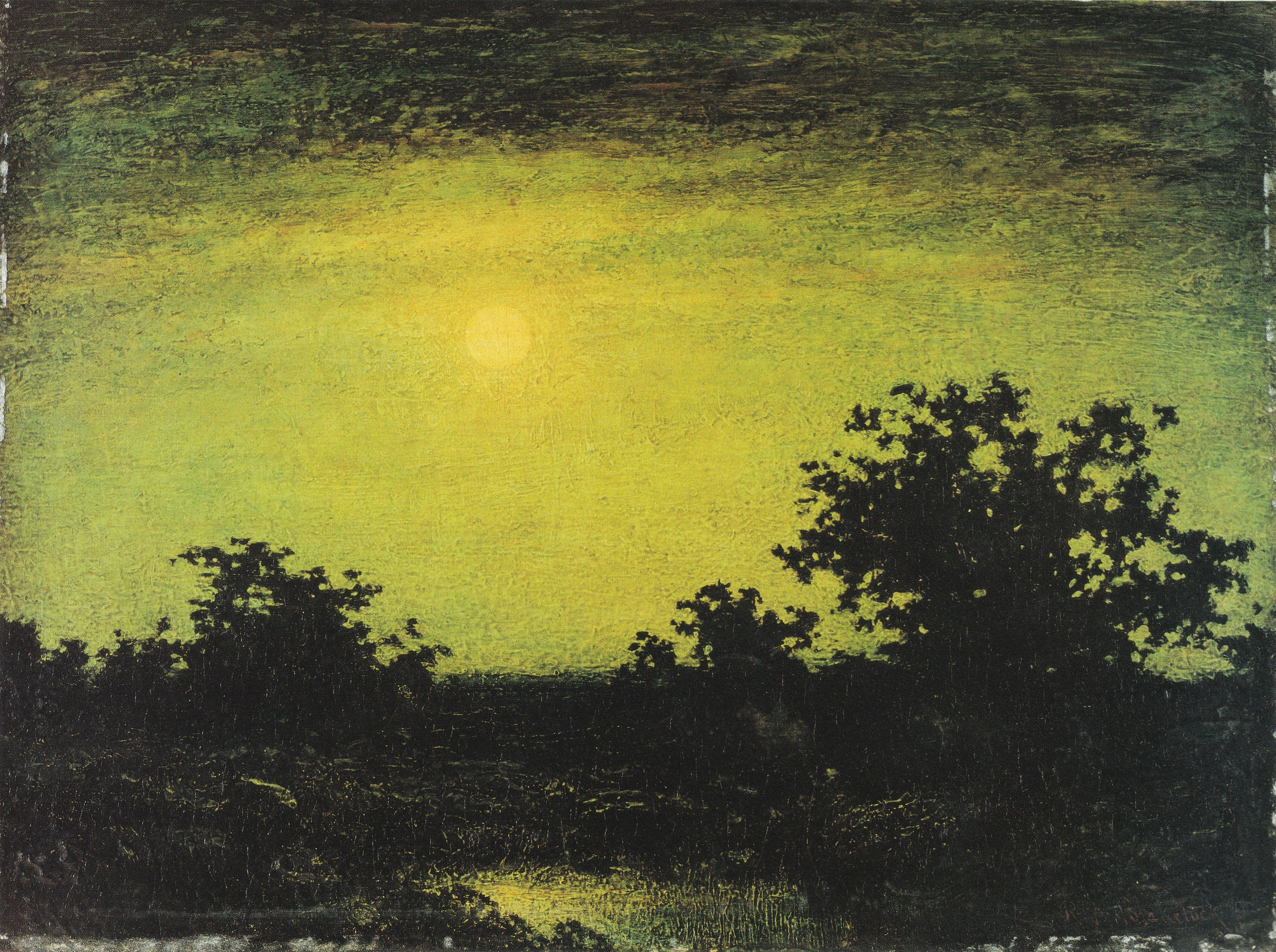
Moonlight, 1885–1890, Columbus Museum of Art

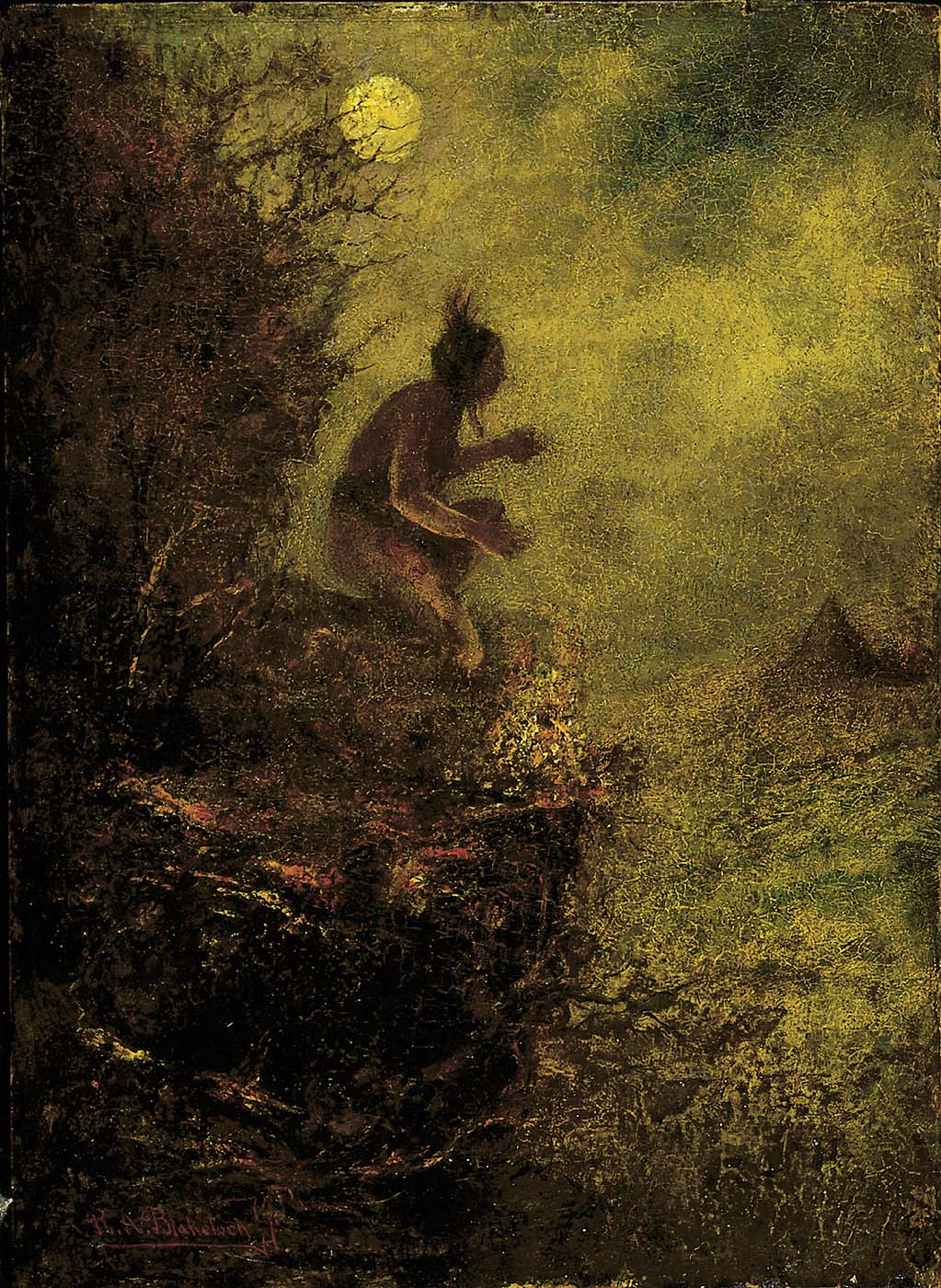
The Signal Fire, 1885–1890, Smithsonian American Art Museum

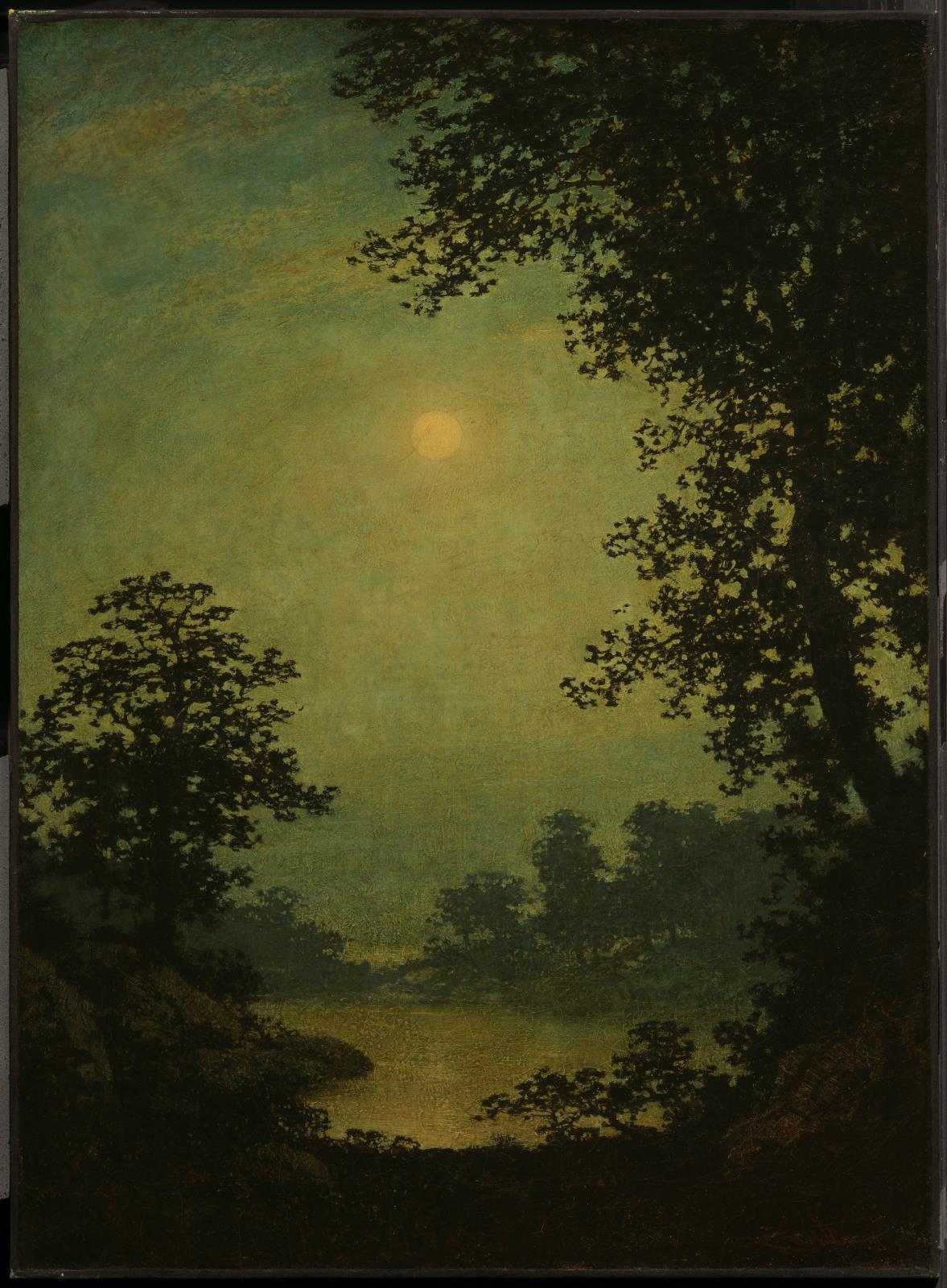
Moonlight Sonata, 1889–1892, Museum of Fine Arts, Boston

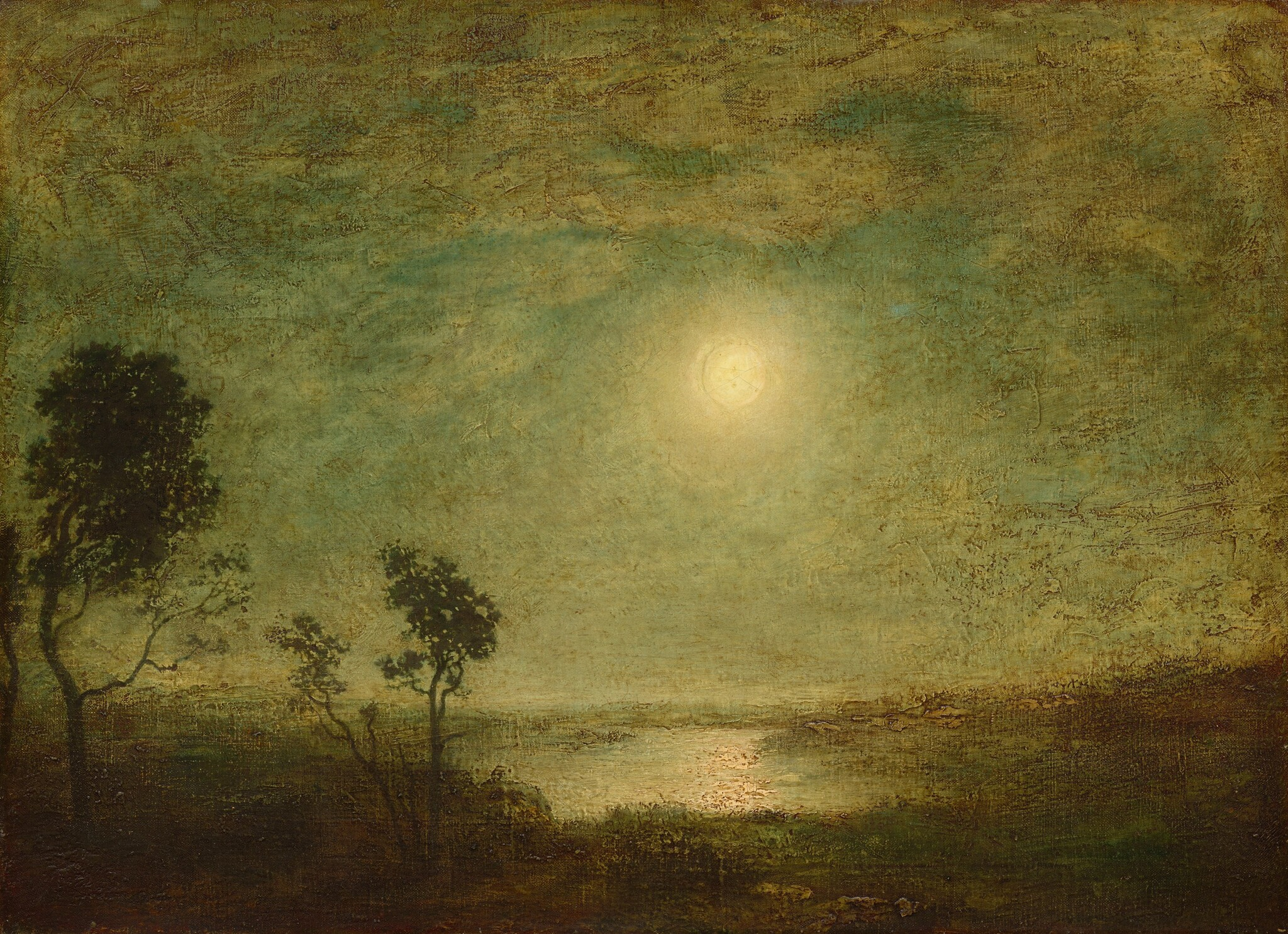
Moonlight, 1886–1895, Corcoran Gallery of Art

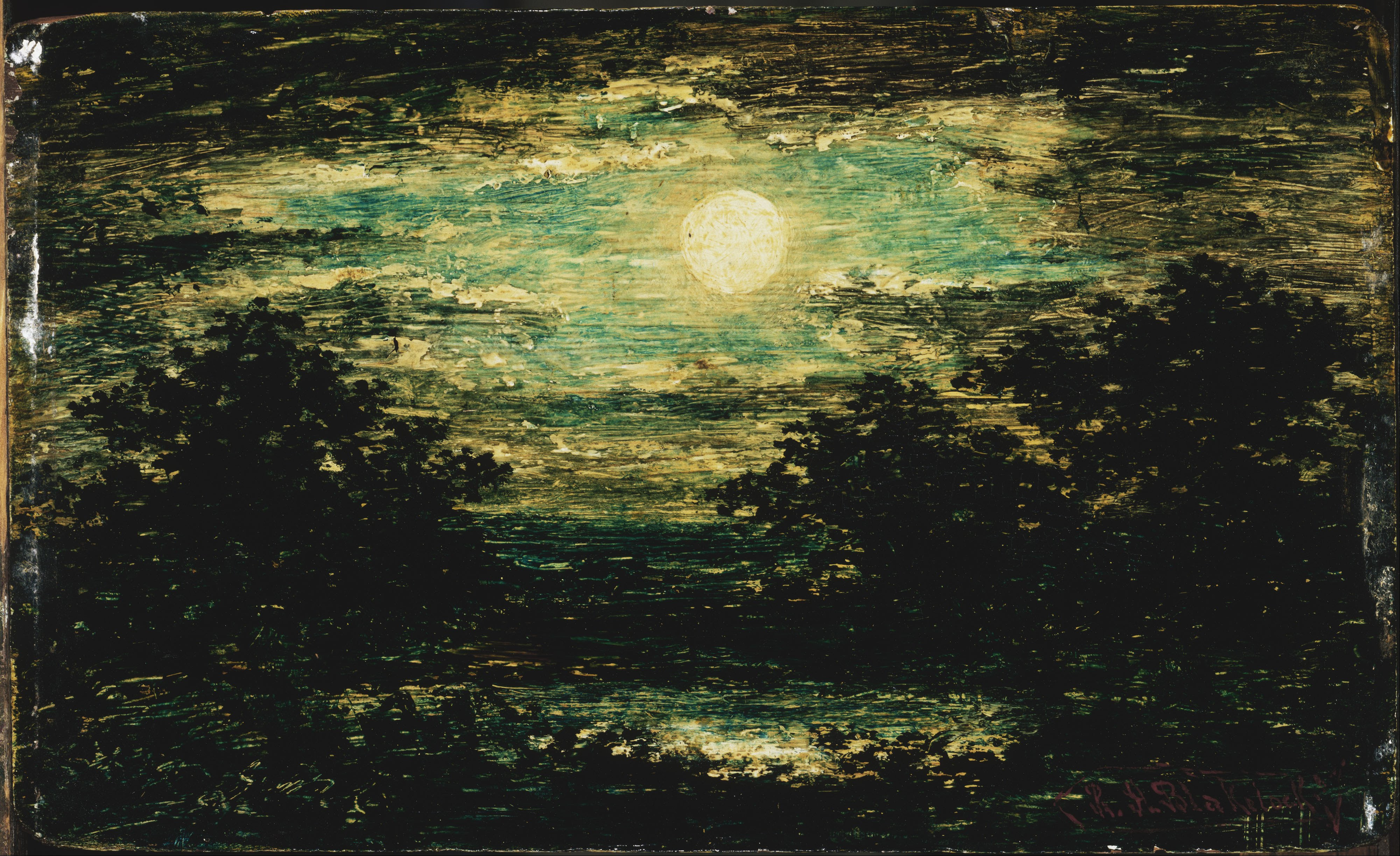
Moonlight, c. late 1880s–1890s, Phillips Collection

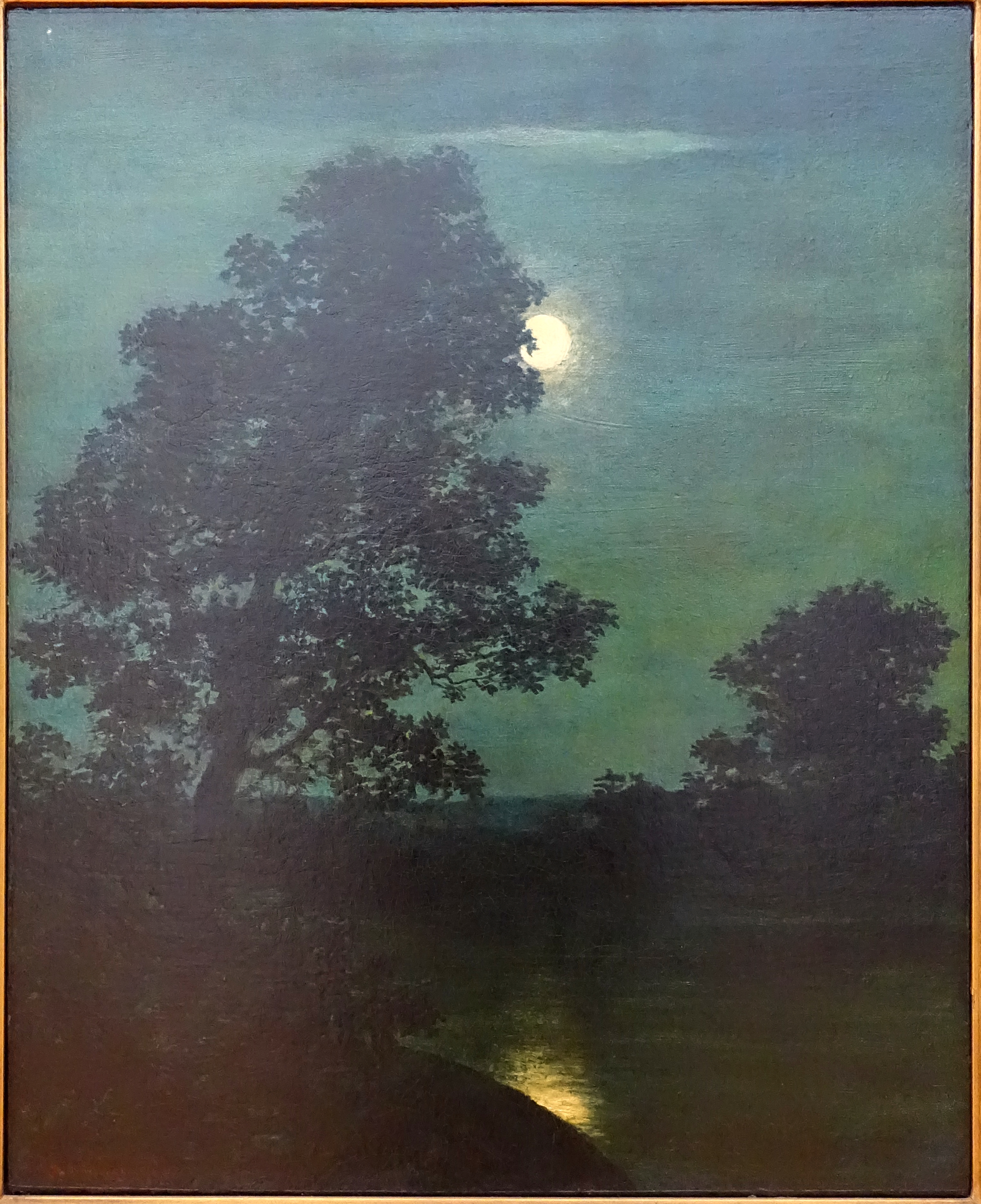
Moonlight on the Brook, 1886–1895, Krannert Art Museum

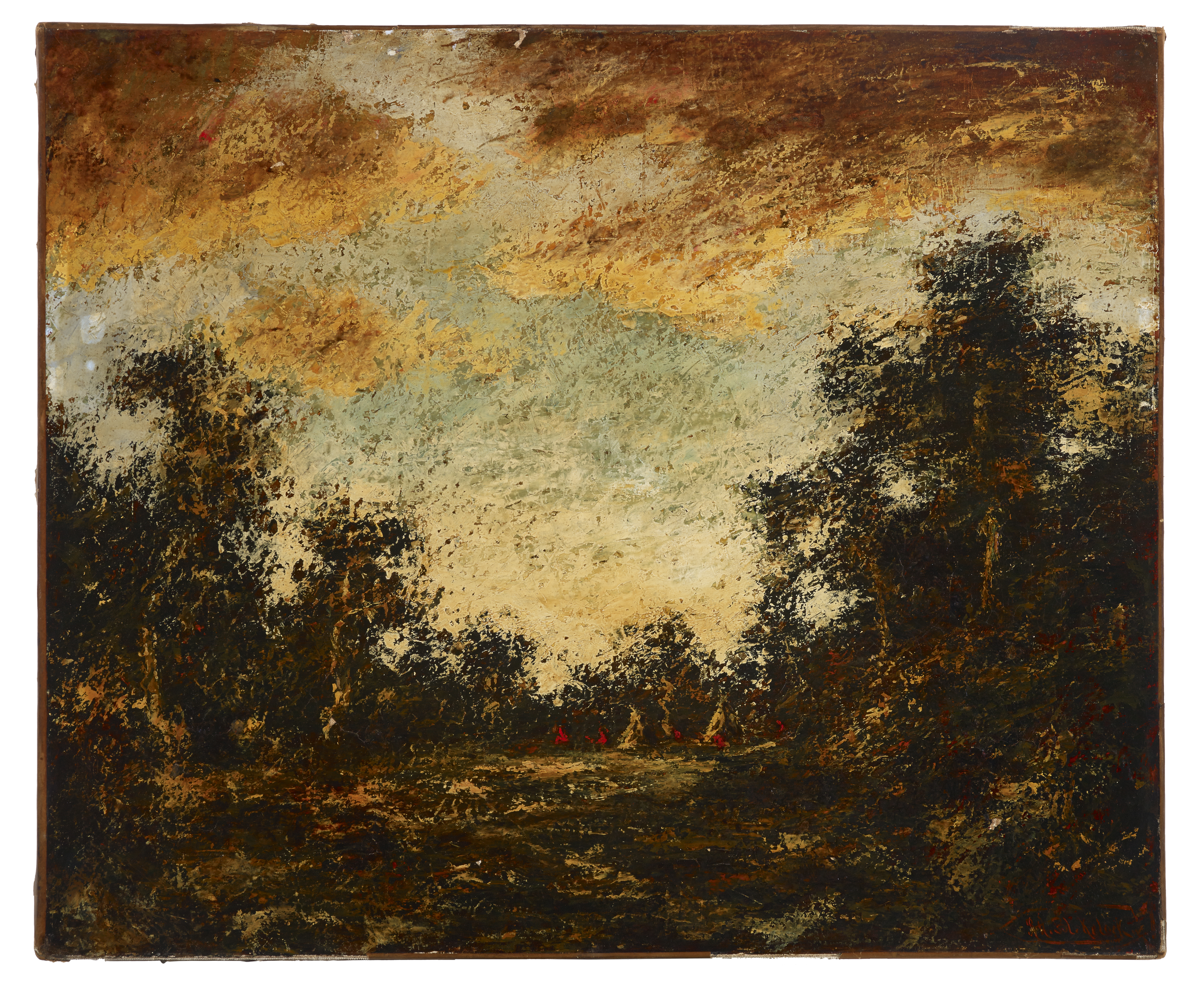
Morning Light, 1902, Indianapolis Museum of Art

== Friendship with Harry Watrous ==
Around or after 1886, Blakelock was befriended by the younger painter Harry Watrous, and often used his studio in the Sherwood Studio Building. "Over the years, when Blakelock was in financial need, Watrous handled his work for him, selling it to art dealers and collectors, something Blakelock often could not manage for himself." Watrous was Blakelock's "most faithful supporter, both during the productive decades of the 1880s and 1890s and during the period of his confinement" for mental illness. Around and after the time of Blakelock's death, Watrous began painting landscapes and nocturnes which "in their evocative mood, boldly designed compositions, and use of light and dark contrasts…resemble the work of his friend Blakelock," and may be seen as elegiac tributes. Some anecdotes about Watrous and Blakelock are related in American Paintings in the Metropolitan Museum of Art, Vol. III.

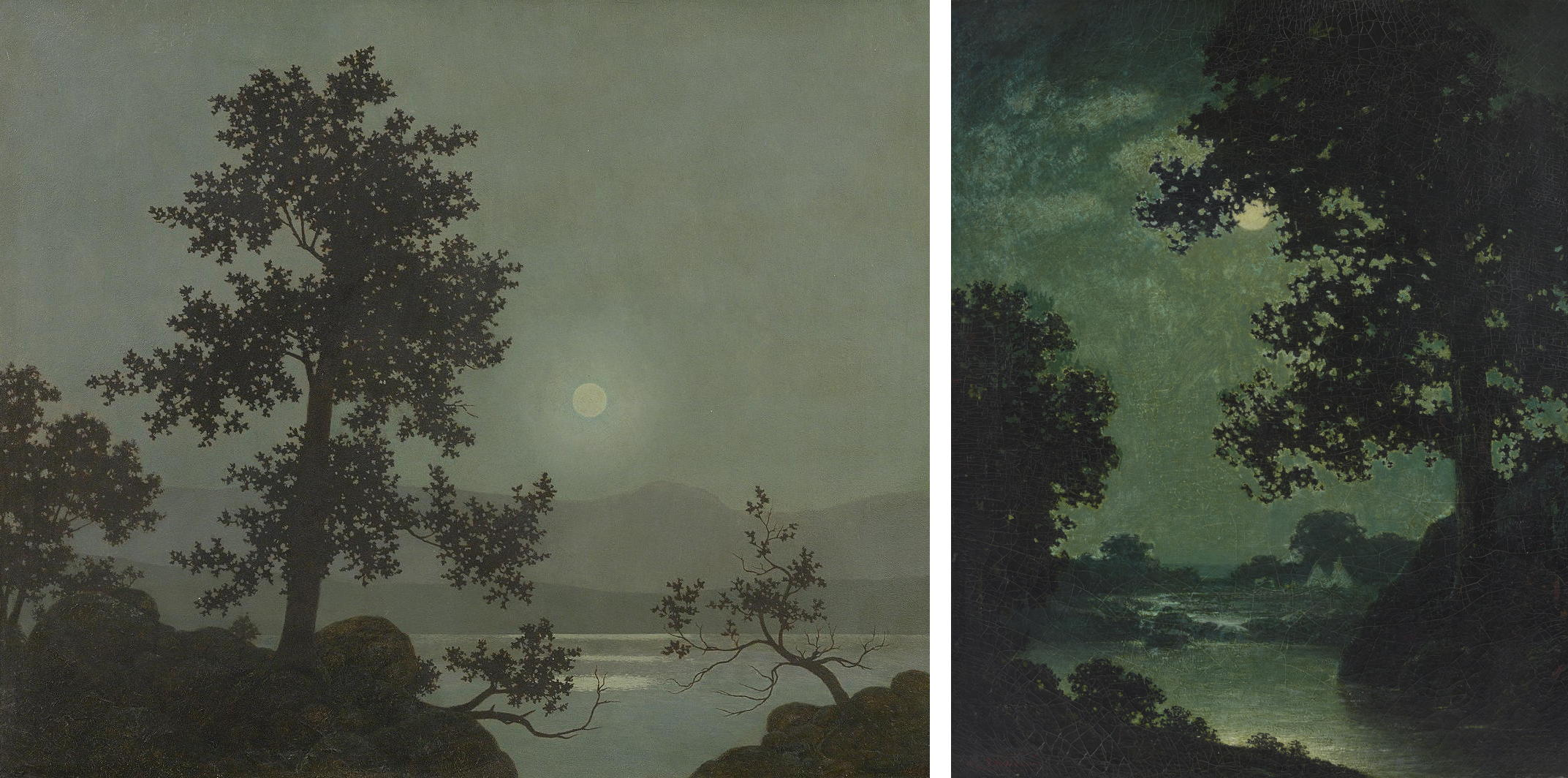
Left: Twilight (c. 1919–1923, private collection), one of Harry Watrous' nocturnes that pays posthumous homage. Right: Blakelock's Moonlight (c. 1888, Yale University Art Gallery).

== In popular culture ==
Blakelock is a key figure in the setting of Paul Auster's novel Moon Palace. In particular, one of his many Moonlight paintings, specifically the 1885 painting (68.7 by 81.3 cm) in the collection of the Brooklyn Museum (see picture in Artworks section below), is referred to in the novel.

Blakelock's paintings are a key plot point in the 2020 movie I'm Thinking of Ending Things.

== Artworks ==
Year	Title	Image	Collection	Comments
1885	Moonlight, oil on canvas		Brooklyn Museum, Brooklyn, New York City	This painting is referred to in Paul Auster's novel Moon Palace
1886	Moonlight (c. 1886–95), oil on canvas	view	Corcoran Gallery of Art, Washington, D.C.	
1885	Moonlight, Indian Encampment (c. 1885–89), oil on canvas	view	Smithsonian American Art Museum, Washington, D.C.	

== Sources ==
- Burke, Doreen Bolger (1994), American Paintings in the Metropolitan Museum of Art, vol. III, Metropolitan Museum of Art, ISBN 9780870992445
- Chisholm, Hugh, ed. (1911). "Blakelock, Ralph Albert" . Encyclopædia Britannica. Vol. 4 (11th ed.). Cambridge University Press.
- Davidson, Abraham. Ralph Albert Blakelock, Penn State University Press, 1996.
- Geske, Norman. Ralph Albert Blakelock: The Great Mad Genius, Questroyal Fine Art, Inc. 2005.
- Vincent, Glyn. The Unknown Night: the madness and genius of R. A. Blakelock, an American painter, Grove Press 2002, ISBN 0-8021-1734-1.
