= First Reading of the Emancipation Proclamation of President Lincoln =

1864 painting

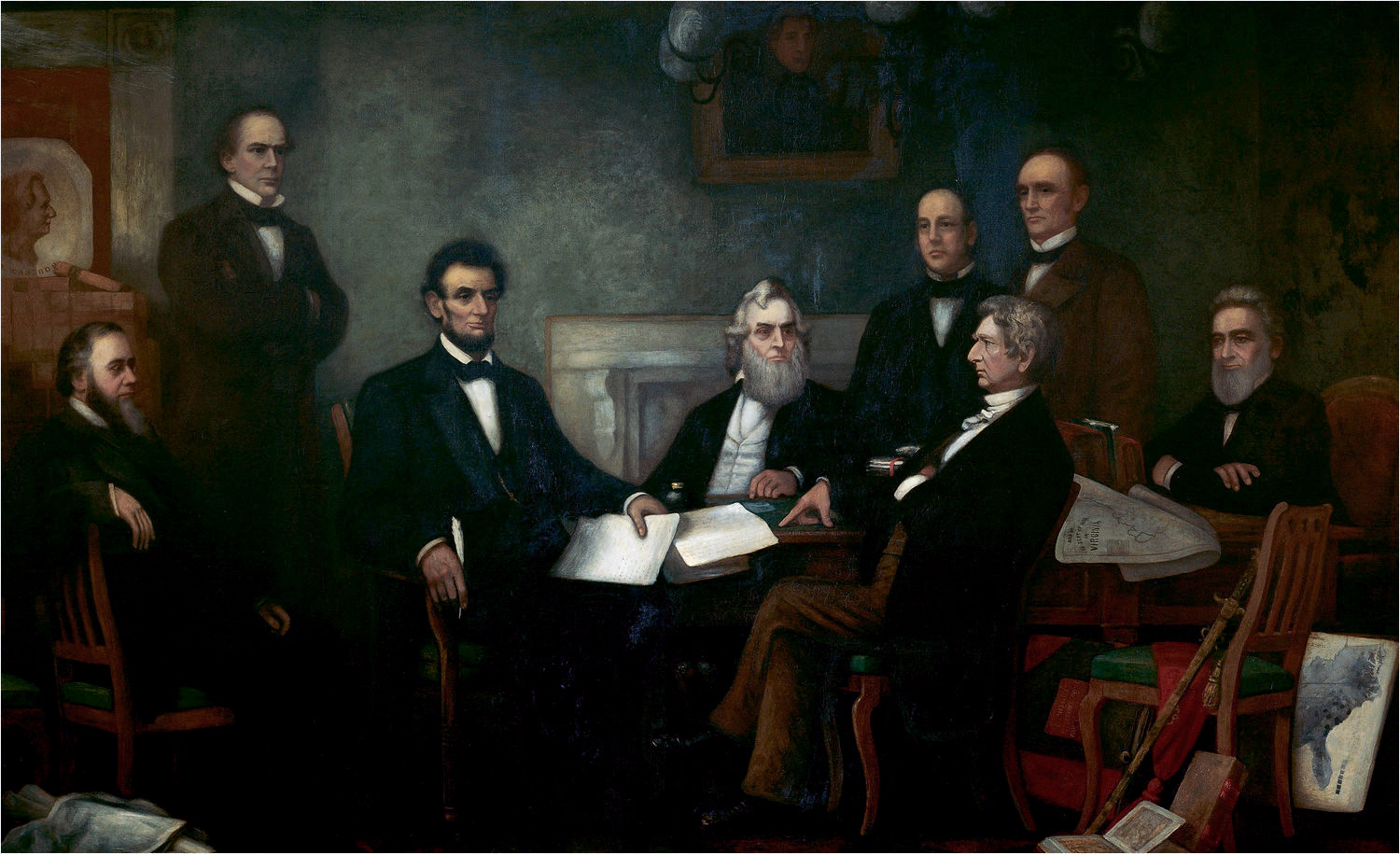
- Artist: Francis Bicknell Carpenter
- Year: 1864; 162 years ago
- Medium: Oil on canvas
- Dimensions: 274.3 cm × 457.2 cm (108 in × 180 in)
- Location: United States Capitol; Washington, D.C., U.S.

First Reading of the Emancipation Proclamation of President Lincoln is an 1864 oil-on-canvas painting by Francis Bicknell Carpenter. In the painting, Carpenter depicts Abraham Lincoln, the 16th president of the United States, and his Cabinet members reading over the Emancipation Proclamation, which proclaimed the freedom of slaves in the ten states in rebellion against the Union in the American Civil War on January 1, 1863. Lincoln presented the preliminary Emancipation Proclamation to his Cabinet on July 22, 1862 and issued it on September 22, 1862. The final Emancipation Proclamation took effect on January 1, 1863.

Carpenter spent six months in the White House while he painted. The painting is displayed at the United States Capitol in Washington, D.C.

== Background ==
Carpenter was deeply moved by Lincoln's Emancipation Proclamation, issued on January 1, 1863, calling it "an act unparalleled for moral grandeur in the history of mankind." Carpenter felt "an intense desire to do something expressive of ... the great moral issue involved in the war."

Carpenter, having formulated his idea for the subject of the painting and outlined its composition, met Frederick A. Lane, a friend who recently had earned a large amount of money. Lane agreed to bankroll Carpenter. By the influence of Samuel Sinclair of the New York Tribune and Representative Schuyler Colfax of Indiana, Carpenter gained Lincoln's assent to travel to Washington and work with him on the painting. Carpenter met with the President on February 6, 1864, who allowed him to live in the White House for four months, to work on the painting.

Carpenter began with many sketches of Cabinet members and of Lincoln himself, working from life, as Lincoln worked, and from photographs taken by Mathew Brady of Lincoln and members of his Cabinet. Carpenter was given free access to Lincoln's White House office for the former purpose, and the State Dining Room was given him for a studio. On July 12, 1864, Lincoln led his cabinet into the State Dining Room to view the completed work.

== Composition ==
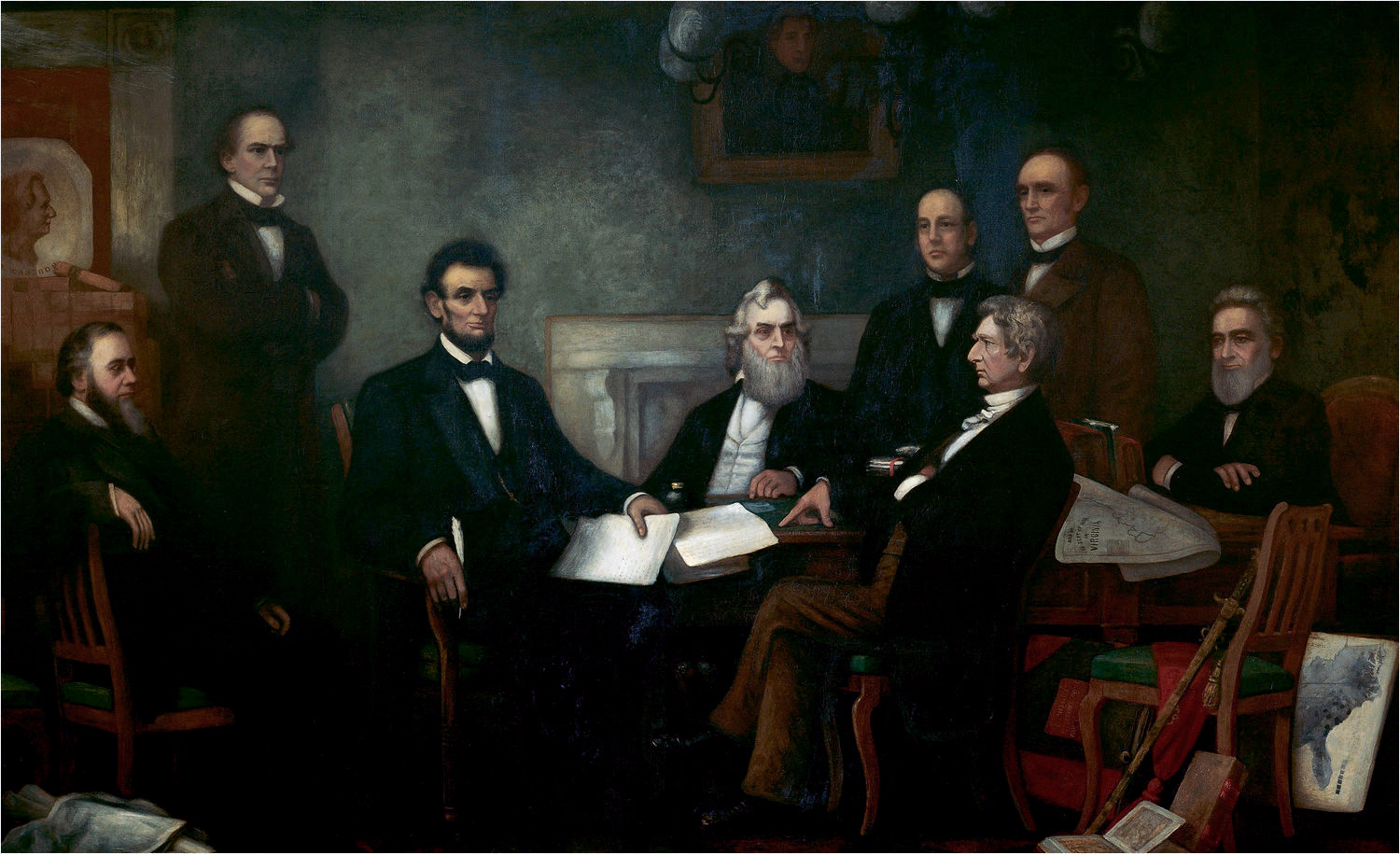
First Reading of the Emancipation Proclamation of President Lincoln by Francis Bicknell Carpenter (1864) (Clickable image—use cursor to identify.)

The setting of the painting is Lincoln's office, which also served as the Cabinet Room; it is now known as the Lincoln Bedroom. Lincoln indicated to Carpenter each person's position in the room on the day of the first reading. The artist had found the placement "fortunately entirely consistent with my purpose." Carpenter intentionally avoided, as he wrote, "imaginary curtain or column, gorgeous furniture or allegorical statue." Shown from left to right are Edwin M. Stanton, Secretary of War (seated); Salmon P. Chase, Secretary of the Treasury (standing); Lincoln; Gideon Welles, Secretary of the Navy (seated); Caleb Blood Smith, Secretary of the Interior (standing); William H. Seward, Secretary of State (seated); Montgomery Blair, United States Postmaster General (standing); and Edward Bates, United States Attorney General (seated). Portraits of Simon Cameron and Andrew Jackson adorn the wall behind them.

Carpenter said, "There were two elements in the Cabinet—the radical and the conservative. Mr. Lincoln was placed at the head of the official table, between two groups, nearest that representing the radical; but the uniting point of both. The chief powers of a government are War and Finance: the ministers of these were at his right—the Secretary of War, symbolizing the great struggle, in the immediate foreground; the Secretary of the Treasury, actively supporting the new policy, standing by the President’s side.... To the Secretary of State, as the great expounder of the principles of the Republican party... would the attention of all at such a time be given.... The ... chief officers of the government were thus brought in accordance with their relations to the administration, nearest the person of the President, who, with the manuscript proclamation in his hand, which he had just read, was represented leaning forward, listening to, and intently considering the views presented by the Secretary of State."

The map shown at the bottom right corner of the painting is a map made by the US Coast Survey in 1861 by using census data from 1860, and shows the relative prevalence of slavery in Southern counties that year.

== Exhibition and reception ==
When Lincoln had the painting exhibited to the public in the East Room of the White House, Carpenter noted that the exhibition was thronged with visitors. An engraving of the painting was made by Alexander Hay Ritchie for mass reproduction. The painting was well received by critics, according to newspaper advertisements for those reproductions; also, many of the subjects in the painting commented favorably. The painting itself then toured the country.

Chase wrote a letter to Carpenter in 1866, remarking the composition of the work, noting that he and Stanton appear symbolically on Lincoln's right in the painting, having "thoroughly endorsed and heartily welcomed the measure," and the cabinet members who had at first "doubted, or advised delay, or even opposed" the proclamation appear on Lincoln's left.

Carpenter later wrote a memoir, Six Months at the White House with Abraham Lincoln, of his experience painting the portrait.

== Purchase and donation to Congress ==
Carpenter campaigned for Congress to purchase the painting, enlisting the help of fellow Homer native William O. Stoddard, Lincoln's private secretary. Congress did not appropriate the money. The painting remained in Carpenter's possession until 1877, when he arranged for Elizabeth Thompson to purchase it for $25,000 and donate it to Congress. A joint session of Congress was held in 1878, on Lincoln's birthday, to serve as a reception for the painting. The artist was present at this event.
