= Florence Carpenter Ives =

American journalist and editor

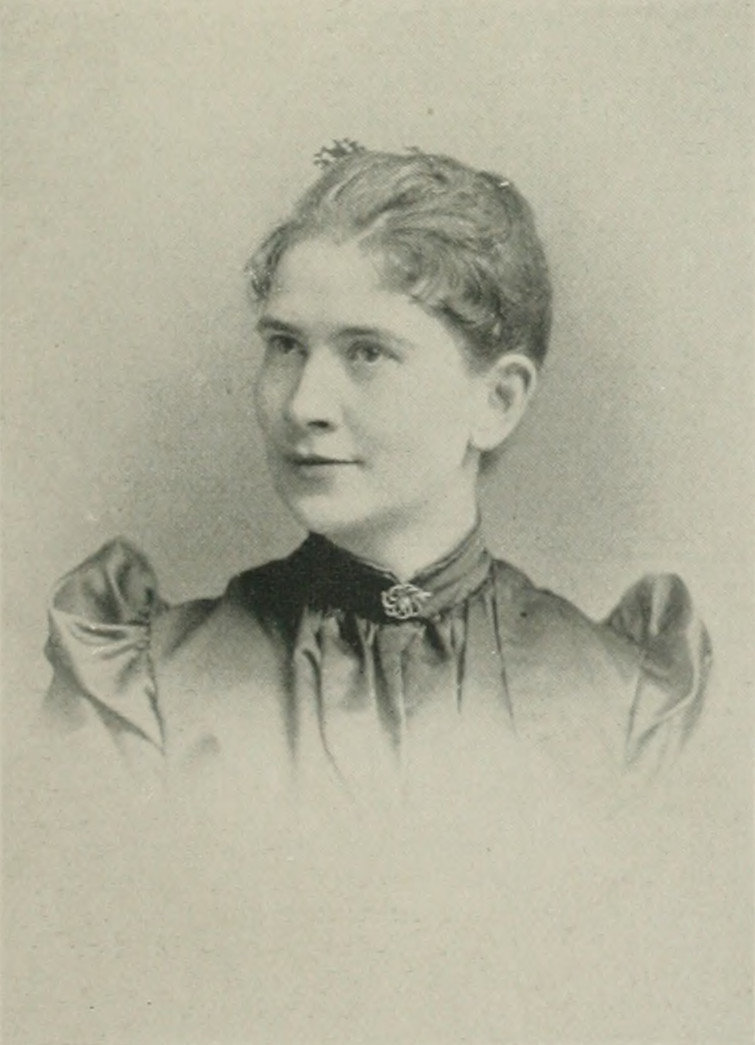
- Photo in A Woman of the Century
- Born: Florence Trumbull Carpenter; March 10, 1854; New York City, US
- Died: December 20, 1900 (aged 46); Quaker Hill, Dutchess County, New York, US
- Resting place: Glenwood Cemetery
- Education: Rutgers Female College
- Occupations: journalist, editor
- Spouse: Albert Chester Ives (m. 1877)
- Children: Emerson Ives
- Relatives: Francis Bicknell Carpenter
- Writing career
- Language: English

Florence Carpenter Ives (née, Carpenter; March 10, 1854 – December 20, 1900) was an American journalist and editor. She served as editor of the woman's department of the Metropolitan and Rural Home. During the World's Columbian Exposition, she was in charge of all the press work sent out by the general board of lady managers to the New York papers. In addition to New York City, she lived in London and Paris, also spending time in Dresden and Dublin.

== Early life and education ==
Florence Trumbull Carpenter was born in New York City, March 10, 1854. She was a daughter of the artist, Francis Bicknell Carpenter. Her father's position in the literary and artistic world and her own beauty made her one of the favorites of the intellectual circles of New York City.

She graduated from Rutgers Female College.

== Career ==
In 1887, in New York City, Ives made her first attempts in newspaper work. Her first position was as a general worker on the Press, where she performed various tasks, including art criticism, society news, fashions, gossip, and articles about women. Her work finally settled into that of literary editor, which place she held as long as her connection with the paper lasted. In 1891, she widened her field of work so as to include many of the leading New York papers, her articles on topics of important and permanent interest appearing in the Sun, the Tribune, the World, the Herald and other journals. She became editor of the woman's department of the Metropolitan and Rural Home.

With the opening of executive work for the World's Columbian Exposition, she was put in charge of all the press work sent out by the general board of lady managers to the New York papers. A few months later, she received an appointment by the World's Fair board of managers of the State of New York as chief executive clerk of the woman's board of that State. That position required her to move to Albany and her temporary withdrawal from active newspaper work in New York, although she retained certain of her connections with the press.

== Personal life ==
On May 12, 1877, soon after her graduation from Rutgers Female College, she married Albert Chester Ives, a journalist of New York, at that time stationed in London, England, where their home, for several years, was one of the centers of attraction for people of the U.S. and England. They lived for several years in a like manner in Paris, France, and also spent time in Dresden and Dublin. Their son, Emerson Ives, was born in 1882, during a year spent in the U.S.

Florence Carpenter Ives died December 20, 1900, at Quaker Hill, Dutchess County, New York. Interment was in Homer, New York.
