= William Stoddard =

American writer

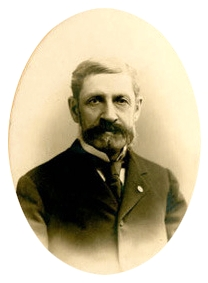
- Born: William Osborn Stoddard; September 24, 1835; Homer, New York
- Died: August 29, 1925 (aged 89); Madison, New Jersey
- Education: University of Rochester
- Occupations: journalist; clerk; author
- Spouse: Susan Eagleson Cooper (m. 1870)
- Children: 5

Signature
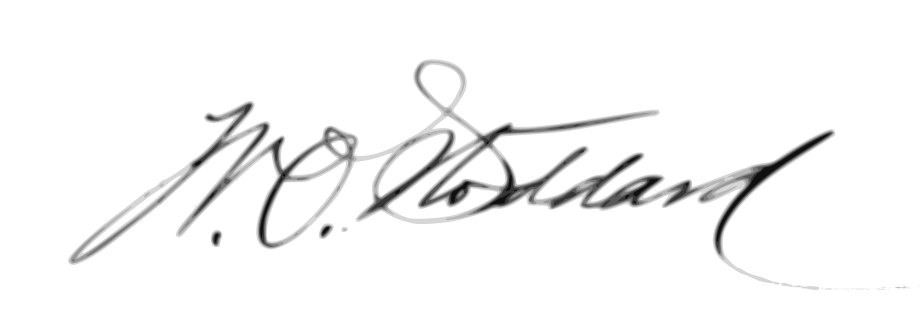

William Osborn Stoddard (1835–1925) was an American journalist, inventor, and author of memoirs, novels, poetry, and children's books. He served in the White House as a private secretary to Abraham Lincoln.

== Biography ==
Stoddard was born in Homer, New York, on September 24, 1835. His parents were Prentice S. and Sarah (Osborn) Stoddard. Stoddard's father was a bookseller, and Stoddard worked in his bookshop while growing up.

Stoddard attended the University of Rochester, where he entered with the Class of 1858 and graduated in 1857. After graduation, he was employed in an "editorial position" in 1857 at the Daily Ledger (Chicago); by 1858 he had become editor and proprietor of the Central Illinois Gazette, in Champaign, Illinois.

Stoddard knew Lincoln, worked hard for his election, and received a government appointment. He first served as a clerk in the Interior Department. On July 15, 1861, he was appointed "Secretary to the President to sign land patents." After a brief period of service in the Army, Stoddard became Assistant Private Secretary to Lincoln and "one of three people doing all the White House clerical work during the early Lincoln administration." Preparation of a digest of newspaper articles was one of his original responsibilities; it was stopped because, according to Stoddard, "Mr. Lincoln never found time to spend an hour upon laborious condensations." It is believed that Stoddard personally made the first copy of the draft Emancipation Proclamation in September 1862.

After two bouts with typhoid, Stoddard left his White House post in July 1864. On September 24, 1864, he was appointed United States Marshal for Arkansas; however, in 1865 he resigned for health reasons. He moved to New York City and worked briefly on Wall Street. He entered government service again from 1871 to 1873, this time for the government of New York City. He was a clerk for the Department of Docks.

Stoddard began publishing his writing in 1869. He wrote poetry, fiction, memoirs, biographies, and 76 children's books, ultimately producing over one hundred books in total.

Stoddard also received nine patents for inventions. One of his inventions was a center-locking printer's chase.

On July 25, 1870, Stoddard married Susan Eagleson Cooper; they had five children. He died at his home in Madison, New Jersey, on August 29, 1925.

== Works ==
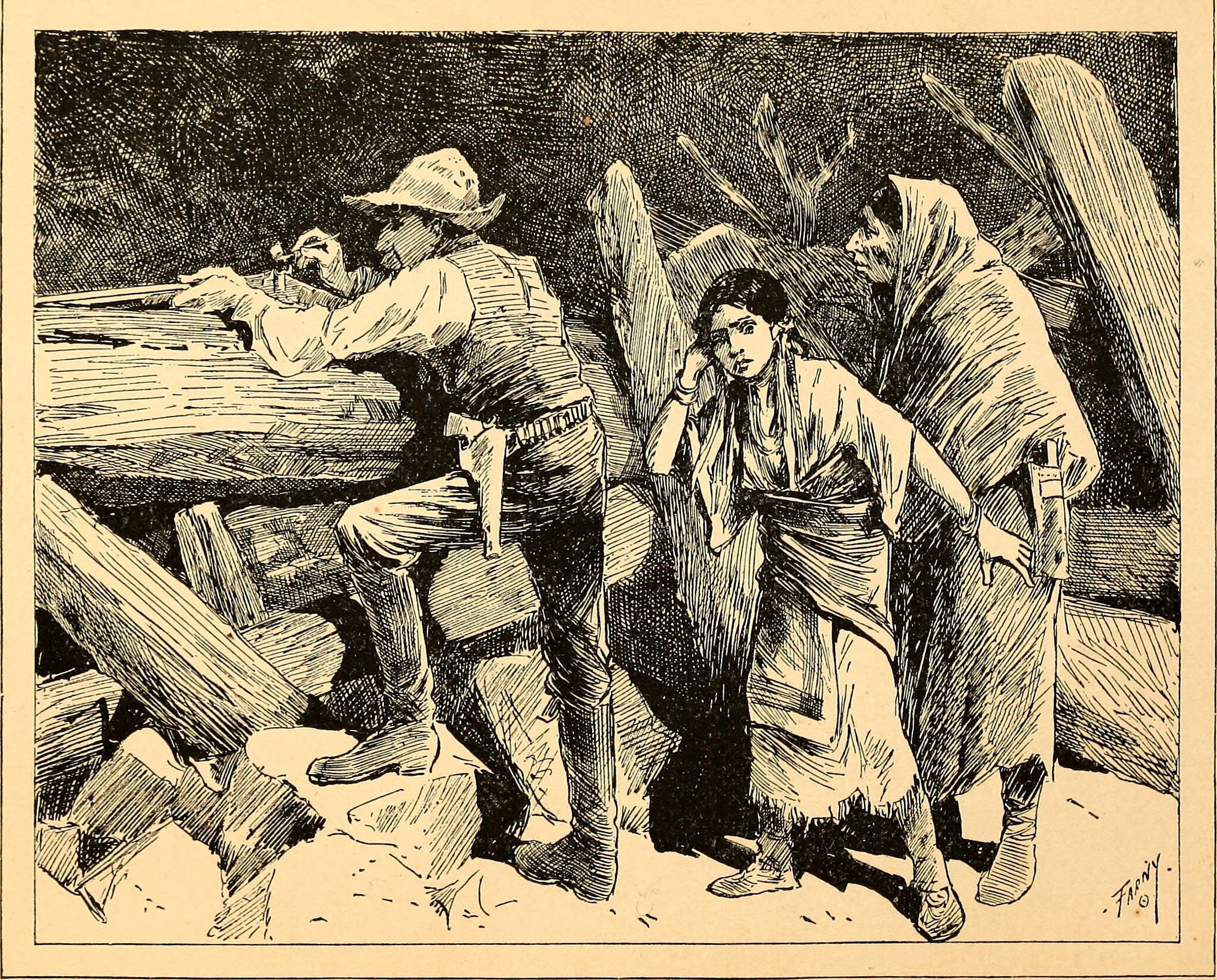
Illustration of Two arrows - a story of red and white (1886)

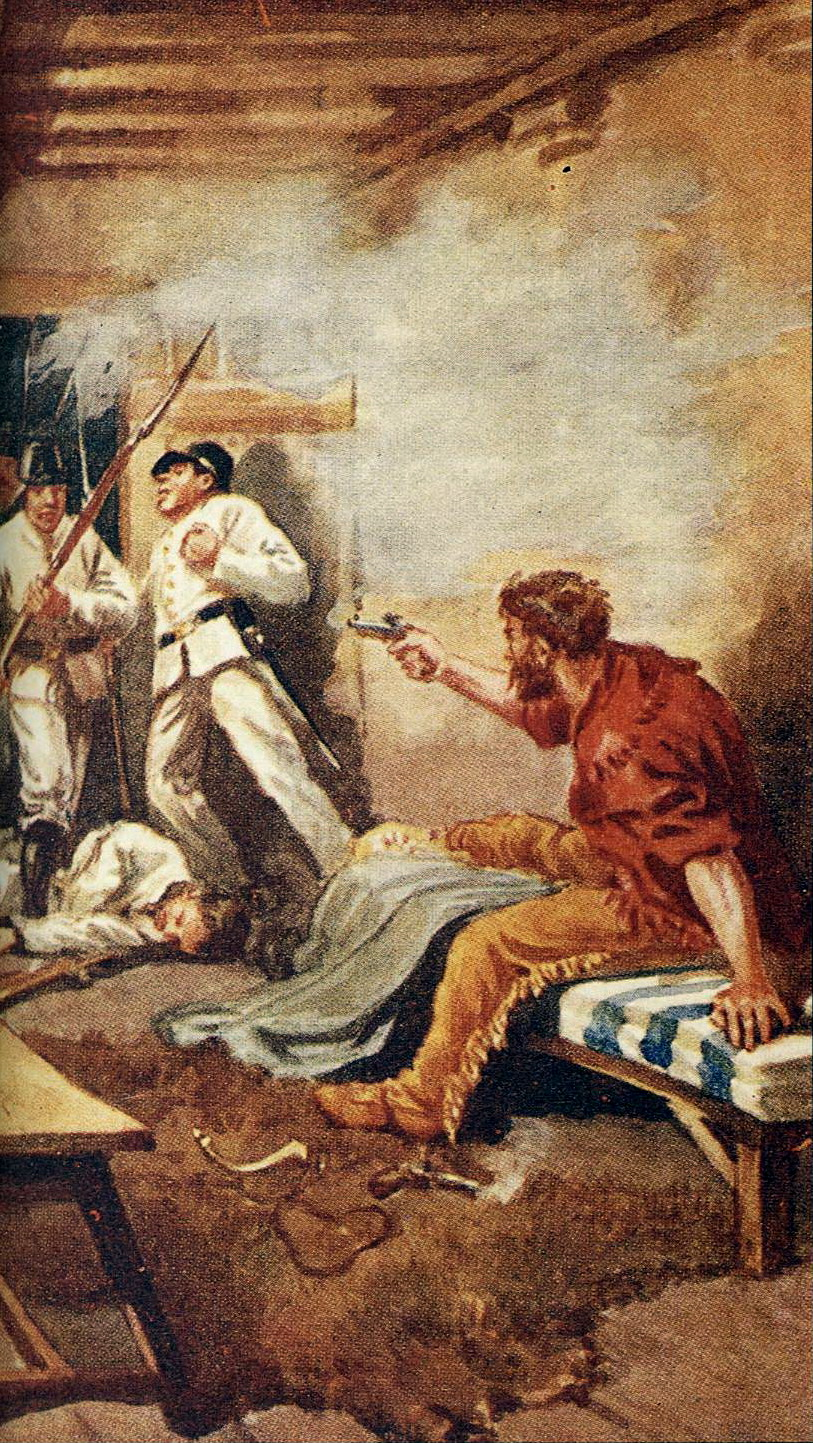
The Lost Gold of the Montezumas: A Story of the Alamo (Illustration by Charles A. Stephens)

- Dismissed (1878)
- The Heart of It (1880)
- Dab Kinzer (1881)
- Esau Hardery (1882)
- Saltillo Boys (1882)
- Talking Leaves (1882)
- Among the Lakes (1883)
- Wrecked? (1883)
- Abraham Lincoln, The True Story of a Great Life: Showing the Inner Growth, Special Training, and Peculiar Fitness of the Man for His Work (1884)
- Two Arrows: A Story of Red and White (1886)
- Chumley's Post: Story of the Pawnee Trail (1886)
- The Lives of the Presidents (10 vols. 1886–9)
- Abraham Lincoln and Andrew Johnson (1888)
- The Red Beauty (1889)
- Crowded Out o' Crofield (1890)
- Inside the White House in War Times (1890)
- The Red Mustang (1890)
- Little Smoke: A Tale of the Sioux (1891)
- The White Cave (1893)
- The Table Talk of Abraham Lincoln (1894)
- On the Old Frontier (1895)
- Winter Fun (1895)
- The Windfall (1896)
- The Lost Gold of the Montezumas (1897)
- With the Black Prince (1898)
- The Despatch Boat of the Whistle A Story of Santiago (1899)
- Ulric the Jarl (1899)
- Lincoln at Work: Sketches from Life (1900)
- Ned, the Son of Webb (1900)
- The Noank's Log (1900)
- Ahead of the Army (1903)
- The Village Champion (1903)
- The Boy Lincoln (1905)
- Lincoln's White House Secretary: The Adventurous Life of William O. Stoddard (2007)
