= Theodore Parker =

American transcendentalist and minister (1810–1860)

The Reverend Theodore Parker
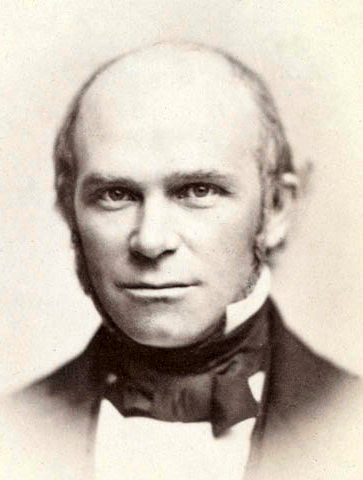
- Parker, c. 1855
- Born: August 24, 1810; Lexington, Massachusetts, U.S.
- Died: May 10, 1860 (aged 49); Florence, Italy
- Education: Harvard University
- Occupation: Minister
- Spouse: Lydia Dodge Cabot
- Relatives: John Parker (captain) (grandfather)

Ecclesiastical career
- Religion: Unitarianism

Theodore Parker (August 24, 1810 – May 10, 1860) was an American transcendentalist and reforming minister of the Unitarian church. A reformer and abolitionist, his words and popular quotations would later inspire speeches by Abraham Lincoln and Martin Luther King Jr.

== Early life and education ==
Parker was born in Lexington, Massachusetts, the youngest child in a large farming family. His paternal grandfather was John Parker, the leader of the Lexington militia at the Battle of Lexington. Among his colonial Yankee ancestors were Thomas Hastings, who came from the East Anglia region of England to the Massachusetts Bay Colony in 1634, and Deacon Thomas Parker, who came from England in 1635 and was one of the founders of Reading, Massachusetts.

Most of Theodore's family had died by the time he was 27, probably due to tuberculosis. Out of eleven siblings, only five remained: three brothers, including Theodore, and two sisters. His mother, to whom he was emotionally close, died when he was eleven. He responded to these tragedies by refusing to lapse into what he called "the valley of tears", focusing instead on other events and demands, and by affirming "the immortality of the soul", later a benchmark of his theology.

Descriptions of Parker as a teenager recall him as "raw" and rough, emotional and poetic, sincere, "arch", "roguish", volatile, witty, and quick. He excelled at academics and gained an early education through country schools and personal study. He studied long and late when farm chores allowed, teaching himself math, Latin, and other subjects. At seventeen he began teaching in local schools. He continued teaching himself and private students in advanced and specialized subjects. He learned Hebrew from Joshua Seixas (son of Gershom Mendes Seixas and Hannah Manuel), whom he may have baptized in a covert conversion to Christianity. He also studied for a time under Convers Francis, who later preached at Parker's ordination.

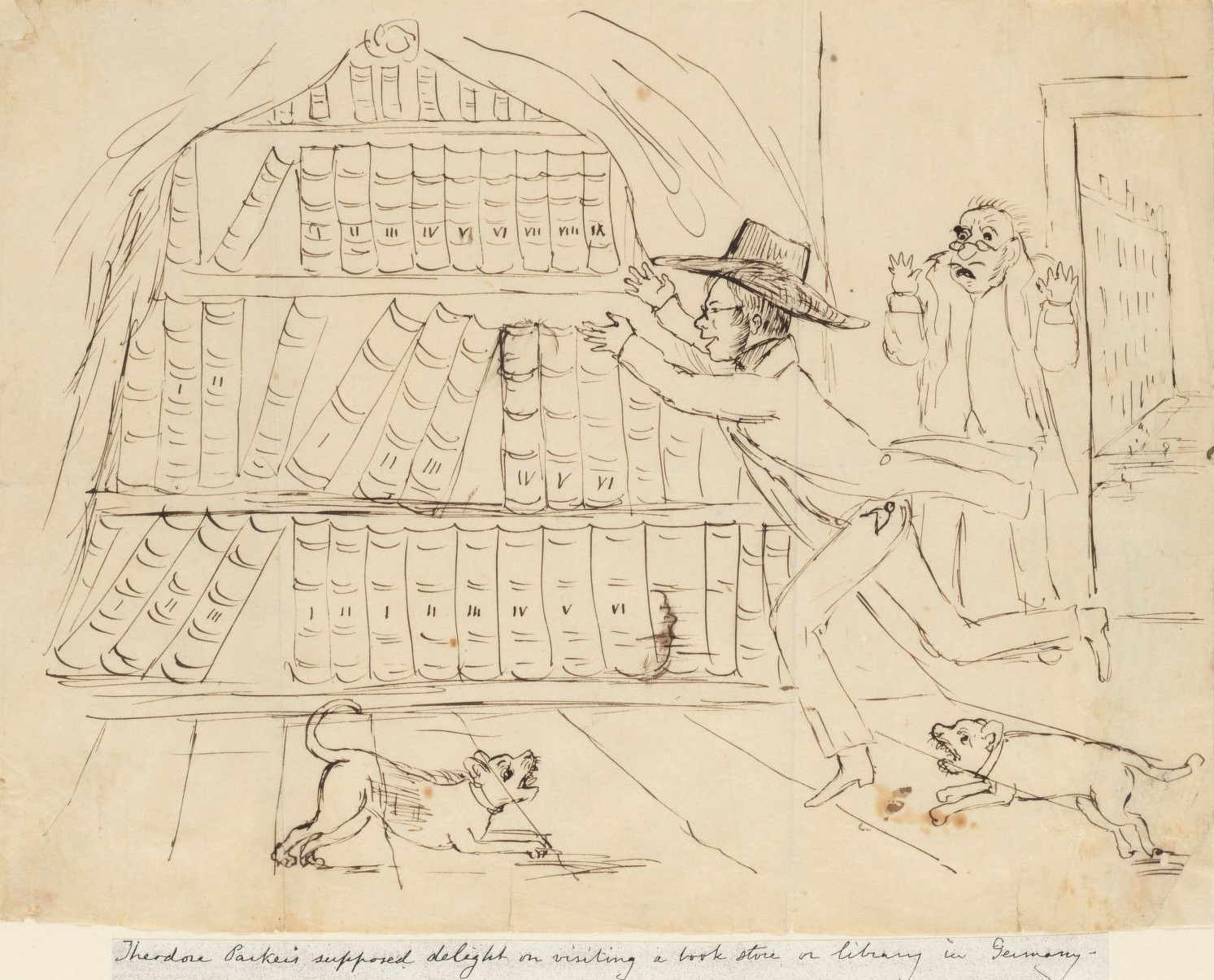
Caricature by Christopher Pearse Cranch depicting Parker's interest in German thinking

In 1830, at age 19, Parker walked the ten miles from Lexington to Cambridge to apply to Harvard College. He was accepted but could not pay the tuition, so he lived and studied at home, continued to work on his father's farm, and joined his classmates only for exams. Under that program, he was able to complete three years of study in one. He then took various posts as a teacher, conducting an academy from 1831 to 1834 at Watertown, Massachusetts, where his late mother's family lived. At Watertown, he met his future wife, Lydia Dodge Cabot. He announced their engagement to his father in October 1833. Theodore and Lydia were married four years later on April 20, 1837.

While at Watertown, Parker produced his first significant manuscript, The History of the Jews, which outlined his skepticism of biblical miracles and an otherwise liberal approach to the Bible. These were to be themes throughout his career.

Parker considered a career in law, but his strong faith led him to theology. He entered the Harvard Divinity School in 1834. He specialized in the study of German theology and was drawn to the ideas of Coleridge, Carlyle, and Emerson. He wrote and spoke (with varying degrees of fluency) Latin, Greek, Hebrew, and German. His journal and letters show that he was acquainted with many other languages, including Chaldee, Syriac, Arabic, Coptic and Ethiopic. He completed the divinity school program quickly, in 1836, in order to marry and begin preaching without delay.

== Career ==
Parker called the late 1830s a "period of...disappointment". Citing "home; children; & a good professional sphere", he wrote in his journal that "All fail me, & all equally." Increasing controversies in his career culminated in a break with orthodoxy in the early 1840s. The fallout from these events affected him deeply, and it took him a few years to land on his feet and move forward.

=== First pastorate ===
Parker had spent 1836 visiting pulpits in the Boston area, but for family reasons accepted a pastorate at West Roxbury, Massachusetts, in 1837. At first, he found the location less than stimulating and work constraining. He adapted to pastoral life, however, and preached in many pulpits around Boston as a visitor. He gained a wide reputation as an earnest, effective speaker. In 1840 Harvard awarded him an honorary master's degree on the basis of his extensive learning.

Parker delivered one especially popular sermon twenty-five times between 1838 and 1841. In it, he argued against the popular notion that religion could be reduced to morality. "The principle of morality is obedience to the Law of con[science]," he wrote, while religion required more: that we "feel naturally, allegiance to a superior Being: dependence on him & accountability to him." The theme of dependence echoes Friedrich Schleiermacher, an indication of the German influence on his theology. Morality involves right acting, while religion requires love of God and regular prayer, which Parker considered essential to human life. "No feeling is more deeply planted in human nature than the tendency to adore a superior being," he preached, "to reverence him, to bow before him, to feel his presence, to pray to him for aid in times of need" and "to bless him when the heart is full of joy."

=== Transcendentalism ===
In 1837, Parker had begun attending meetings of the group later known as the Transcendental Club. Ralph Waldo Emerson's Divinity School Address that year had been deeply arresting to him, and he welcomed the opportunity to associate with Emerson, Amos Bronson Alcott, Orestes Brownson, and several others. Transcendentalists such as Henry David Thoreau and Parker wrote of the world as divine, and of themselves as part of this divinity. Unlike Emerson and other Transcendentalists, however, Parker believed the movement was rooted in deeply religious ideas and did not believe it should retreat from religion. All shared a conviction that slavery should be abolished and social reforms should take root.

Parker gradually introduced Transcendentalist ideas into his sermons. He tempered his radicalism with diplomacy and discretion, however. "I preach abundant heresies," he wrote to a friend, "and they all go down—for the listeners do not know how heretical they are." For years he had wrestled with the factuality of the Hebrew Scriptures, and by 1837 he was wishing "some wise man would now write a book...and show up the absurdity of...the Old Testament miracles, prophecies, dreams, miraculous births, etc.'" He was hardly alone. "'What shall we do with the Old Testament?' asked fellow Unitarian James Walker in 1838. 'That question is of such frequent recurrence among laymen as well as clergymen, that any well-considered attempt to answer it, or supply the means of answering it, is almost sure of hearty welcome." Questions regarding biblical realism and meaning, and the answers clergy increasingly found through the German-based higher criticism, formed the basis of liberal Christianity as it emerged and developed throughout the nineteenth century.

In 1838 Parker published his first major article, a critical review of an orthodox work written by his former professor John Gorham Palfrey. In it Parker broke for the first time with supernatural realism, as he also increasingly did in his sermons. To him, Christianity was natural rather than miraculous. More and more, he praised social reform movements such as those for temperance, peace, and the abolition of slavery. In 1840 he described such movements as divinely inspired, though he added that they did not fully address the spiritual and intellectual ills of society. Controversy mounted regarding these and other Transcendentalist elements in his work. So did criticism, which often saddened and distressed him.

=== Break with Orthodoxy ===
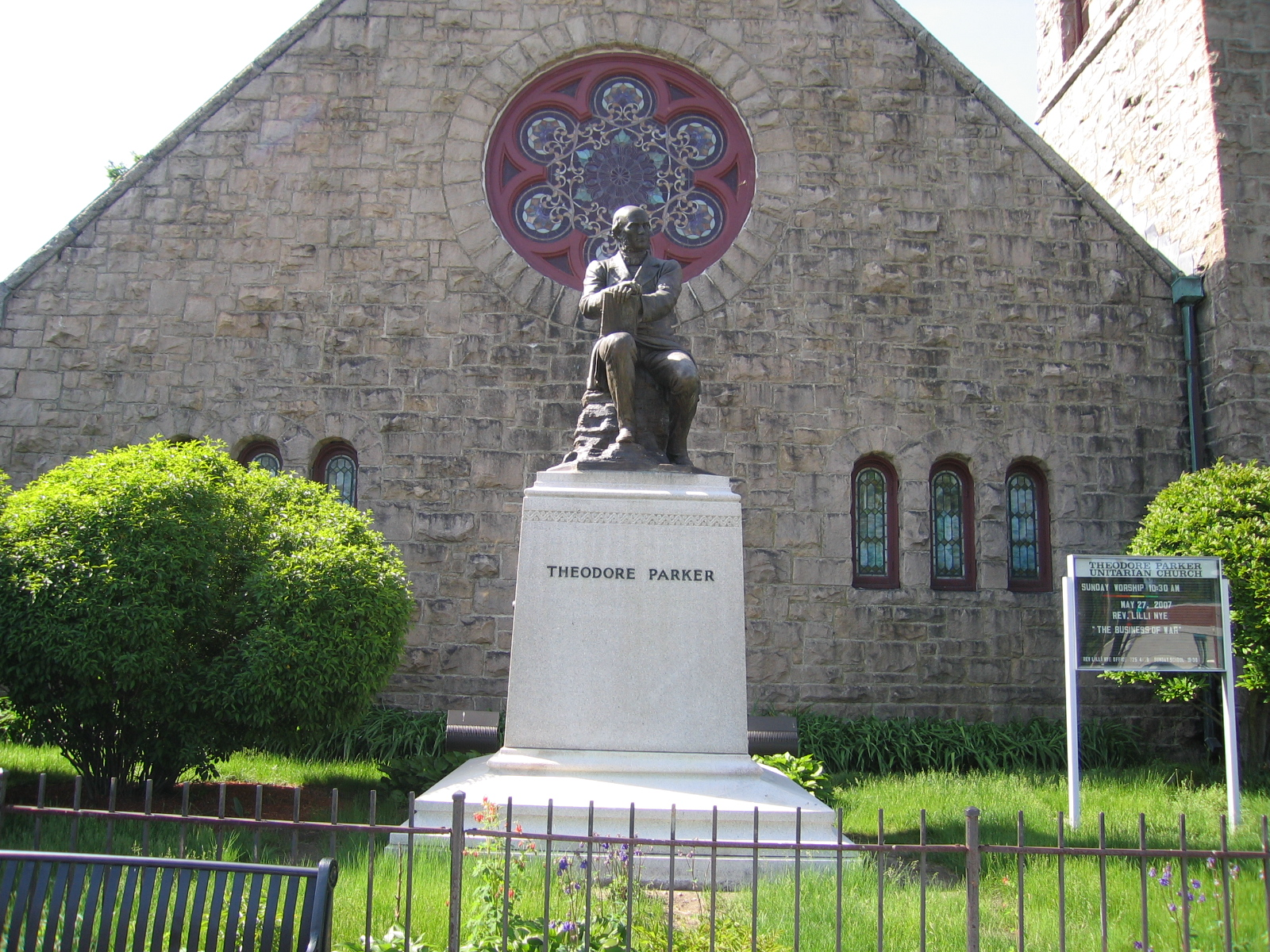
Parker's statue in front of the Theodore Parker Church, a Unitarian parish in West Roxbury, Massachusetts

In 1841, Parker laid bare his radical theological position in a sermon titled A Discourse on the Transient and Permanent in Christianity, in which he espoused his belief that the traditions of historic Christianity did not reflect the truth. In so doing, he made an open break with orthodox theology. He instead argued for a type of Christian belief and worship in which the essence of Jesus's teachings remained permanent but the words, traditions, and other forms of their conveyance did not. He stressed the immediacy of God and saw the Church as a communion, looking upon Christ as the supreme expression of God. Ultimately, he rejected all miracles and revelation and saw the Bible as full of contradictions and mistakes. He retained his faith in God but suggested that people experience God intuitively and personally, and that they should center their religious beliefs on individual experience.

Parker's West Roxbury church remained loyal. Sermons and media attacked him, however, when he denied Biblical miracles and the literal authority of the Bible and Jesus. Many questioned his Christianity. Nearly all the pulpits in the Boston area were closed to him, and he lost friends. Parker reacted with grief and defiance. He remained unwilling to concede that his views placed him beyond the outer bounds of Unitarian liberalism. After this unwilling break with the Unitarian establishment, he spent two years (1841–1843) adjusting to the reality of his newly controversial and independent career and increasing his social activism on religious grounds. He began to see himself as a prophetic religious reformer.

Parker also expressed doubts of the claims of the new spiritualist movement. Despite this, he became popular with some spiritualists because of his critique of the religious establishment, and was even published in the spiritualist magazine Banner of Light.

== Personal life ==
Parker and Lydia Cabot married in 1837, but the union was rocky from the start. In 1840 he befriended a neighbor, Anna Blake Shaw. Although their relationship was by all accounts not sexual, it caused problems with his wife.

== Mature home life and career, 1843–1859 ==
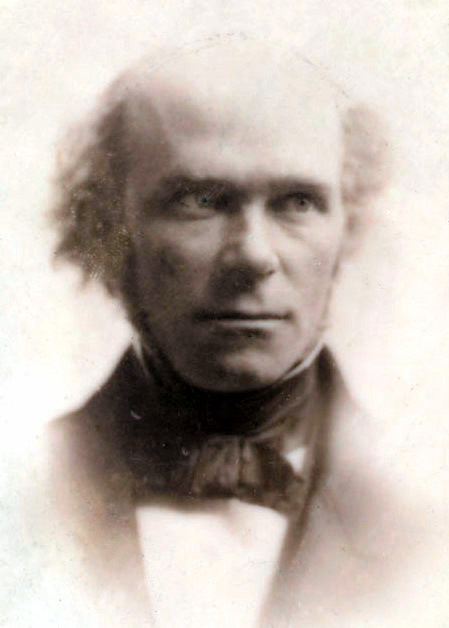
Parker c. 1850

Parker's family life, temperament, and work steadied during the 1840s. The second half of his career revolved around antislavery, democracy, and religious social activism.

=== Travel to Europe ===
In 1843 and 1844, Theodore and Lydia traveled in Europe. While there his theology, career, and personal life matured and steadied. He was no longer as sensitive to criticism and bore difficulties more easily. Away from extended family problems in West Roxbury, his marriage seems to have improved and become more steadily affectionate. Despite complex issues that occasionally resurfaced, he and Lydia were happier. "My wife is kind as an angel," he would write in his journal during denominational trials in 1845. His travels also seemed to stimulate a growing interest in political and social issues.

=== Independent Boston pastorate ===
Returning to the United States, Parker found Unitarianism on the cusp of a division over his right to fellowship as a minister. His controversial 1841 sermon had created a stir that ballooned into an all-out storm in 1844 at the Church of the Disciples. The debate over the nature and degree of Parker's "infidelity" caused Unitarians to adopt a liberal creed, which they had formerly declined to do based on an inclusive principle. Their position proved too orthodox to include Parker.

In January, 1845, a sizeable group of supporters gathered at Marlboro Chapel in Boston and resolved to provide Parker "a chance to be heard in Boston." Calling themselves "Friends of Theodore Parker", they hired a hall and invited him to preach there on Sunday mornings. Despite misgivings, Parker accepted and preached his first sermon at the Melodeon (Boston, Massachusetts) Theater in February. Although the arrangement was temporary at first, he resigned his West Roxbury pastorate in early 1846 (to the dismay of his faithful parishioners there). He elected to call his new congregation the 28th Congregational Society of Boston; after the Melodeon, Parker's congregation met in the Boston Music Hall on Winter Street, Boston.

Parker's congregation grew to 2,000 and included influential figures such as Louisa May Alcott, William Lloyd Garrison, Julia Ward Howe (a personal friend), and Elizabeth Cady Stanton. Stanton called his sermons "soul-satisfying" when beginning her career, and she credited him with introducing her to the idea of a Heavenly Mother in the Trinity. Parker was increasingly known for preaching what he and his followers identified as a type of prophetic Christian social activism.

The 28th Congregational Society, now renamed Theodore Parker Unitarian Church, located on 1851 Centre Street in West Roxbury was designated a Boston Landmark by the Boston Landmarks Commission in 1985.

=== Reform movements and social theology ===
After 1846, Parker shifted from a focus on Transcendentalism and challenging the bounds of Unitarian theology to a focus on the gathering national divisions over slavery and the challenges of democracy. In Boston, he led the movement to combat the stricter Fugitive Slave Act, a controversial part of the Compromise of 1850. This act required law enforcement and citizens of all states—free states as well as slave states—to assist in recovering fugitive slaves. Parker called the law "a hateful statute of kidnappers" and helped organize open resistance to it. He and his followers formed the Boston Vigilance Committee, which refused to assist with the recovery of fugitive slaves and helped hide them. For example, they smuggled away Ellen and William Craft when Georgian slave catchers came to Boston to arrest them. Due to such efforts, from 1850 to the onset of the American Civil War in 1861, only twice were slaves captured in Boston and transported back to the South. On both occasions, Bostonians combatted the actions with mass protests.

As Parker's early biographer John White Chadwick wrote, Parker was involved with almost all of the reform movements of the time: "peace, temperance, education, the condition of women, penal legislation, prison discipline, the moral and mental destitution of the rich, the physical destitution of the poor" though none became "a dominant factor in his experience" with the exception of his antislavery views. He "denounced the Mexican War and called on his fellow Bostonians in 1847 'to protest against this most infamous war,'" while at the same time promoting economic expansionism and exposing a racist view of Mexicans' inherent inferiority, calling them "a wretched people; wretched in their origin, history, and character".

Yet his abolitionism became his most controversial stance. He wrote the scathing To a Southern Slaveholder in 1848, as the abolition crisis was heating up, and took a strong stance against slavery and advocated violating the Fugitive Slave Law of 1850, a controversial part of the Compromise of 1850 which required the return of escaped slaves to their owners. Parker worked with many fugitive slaves, some of whom were among his congregation. As in the case of William and Ellen Craft, he hid them in his home. Although he was indicted for his actions, he was never convicted.

As a member of the Secret Six, he supported financially the abolitionist John Brown. After Brown's arrest, Parker wrote a public letter, "John Brown's Expedition Reviewed", arguing for the right of slaves to kill their masters and defending Brown's actions.

== Death ==
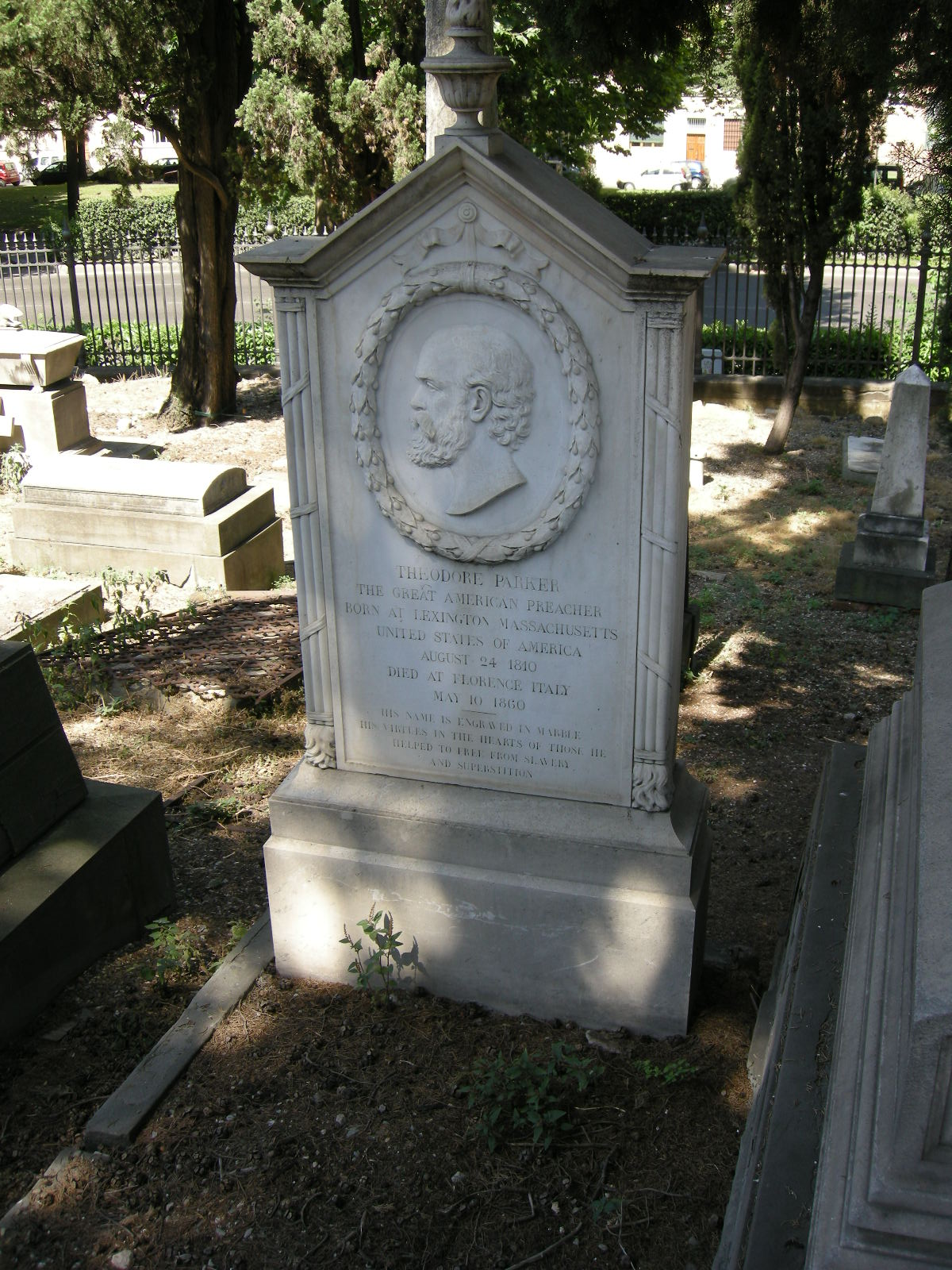
Parker's tomb in Florence

Following a lifetime of overwork, Parker's ill health forced his retirement in 1859. He developed tuberculosis, then without effective treatment, and departed for Florence, Italy, where he died on May 10, 1860. He sought refuge in Florence because of his friendship with Elizabeth Barrett and Robert Browning, Isa Blagden and Frances Power Cobbe, but died scarcely a month following his arrival. It was less than a year before the outbreak of the American Civil War.

Parker was a patient of William Wesselhoeft, who practiced homeopathy. Wesselhoeft gave the oration at Parker's funeral. He is buried in the English Cemetery in Florence. When Frederick Douglass visited Florence, he went first from the railroad station to Parker's tomb.

Parker's headstone by Joel Tanner Hart was later replaced by one by William Wetmore Story. The British writer Fanny Trollope, also buried here, wrote the first anti-slavery novel and Richard Hildreth wrote the second. Both books were used by Harriet Beecher Stowe for her antislavery novel Uncle Tom's Cabin (1852).

== Legacy and honors ==
Unitarian Universalists honor Theodore Parker as "a canonical figure—the model of a prophetic minister in the American Unitarian tradition."

The church in West Roxbury where Parker held his first pastorate (1837–1846) was renamed Theodore Parker Unitarian Universalist Church in 1962. It retains this name today.

Frances P. Cobbe collected and published Parker's writings in 14 volumes.

According to Unitarian clergyman John White Chadwick, Parker made common use of the phrase, "A democracy—of all the people, by all the people, for all the people" in his letters and writing. It appears publicly in a speech by Parker at an 1850 anti-slavery convention. William H. Herndon, Lincoln's law partner, witnessed Parker use the phrase in a July 4, 1858 address and claimed to have given Lincoln a copy, which Lincoln later used in formulating his Gettysburg Address.

Parker predicted the inevitable success of the abolitionist cause, inventing the moral arc of history in the process:

I do not pretend to understand the moral universe; the arc is a long one, my eye reaches but little ways; I cannot calculate the curve and complete the figure by the experience of sight; I can divine it by conscience. And from what I see I am sure it bends towards justice.

A century later, Martin Luther King Jr. would paraphrase these words in a number of his speeches and sermons, including: a prepared statement he read in 1956 following the conclusion of the Montgomery bus boycott; his speech "How Long, Not Long", delivered in March 1965, when the last of the Selma to Montgomery marches reached the Alabama State Capitol; "Where Do We Go From Here?", delivered in August 1967 to the Southern Christian Leadership Conference; and his "Remaining Awake Through a Great Revolution" sermon, delivered in March 1968 at the National Cathedral. In each instance, King's paraphrase included the words "The arc of the moral universe is long, but it bends toward justice". In 1963, Betty Friedan's influential best seller, The Feminine Mystique, believed to have sparked the 1960s and 70s women's movement, bore the following 1853 epigraph from Theodore Parker:

The domestic function of the woman does not exhaust her powers... To make one half of the human race consume its energies in the functions of housekeeper, wife and mother is a monstrous waste of the most precious material God ever made.

Eight months after the publication of Friedan's book, Kurt Vonnegut uses the same quote in his short story "Lovers Anonymous", first published in the October issue of Redbook magazine and reprinted in Vonnegut's 1999 collection Bagombo Snuff Box.

The beige rug chosen for President Barack Obama's remodeled Oval Office in August 2010, was bordered by five quotations, two of which (by Lincoln and King) are inspired by the writings of Parker, as noted above.

== See also ==
- American Unitarian Association
- Jennie Collins, social reformer inspired by Parker
- List of opponents of slavery
