= Wood End School =

Wood End Elementary School
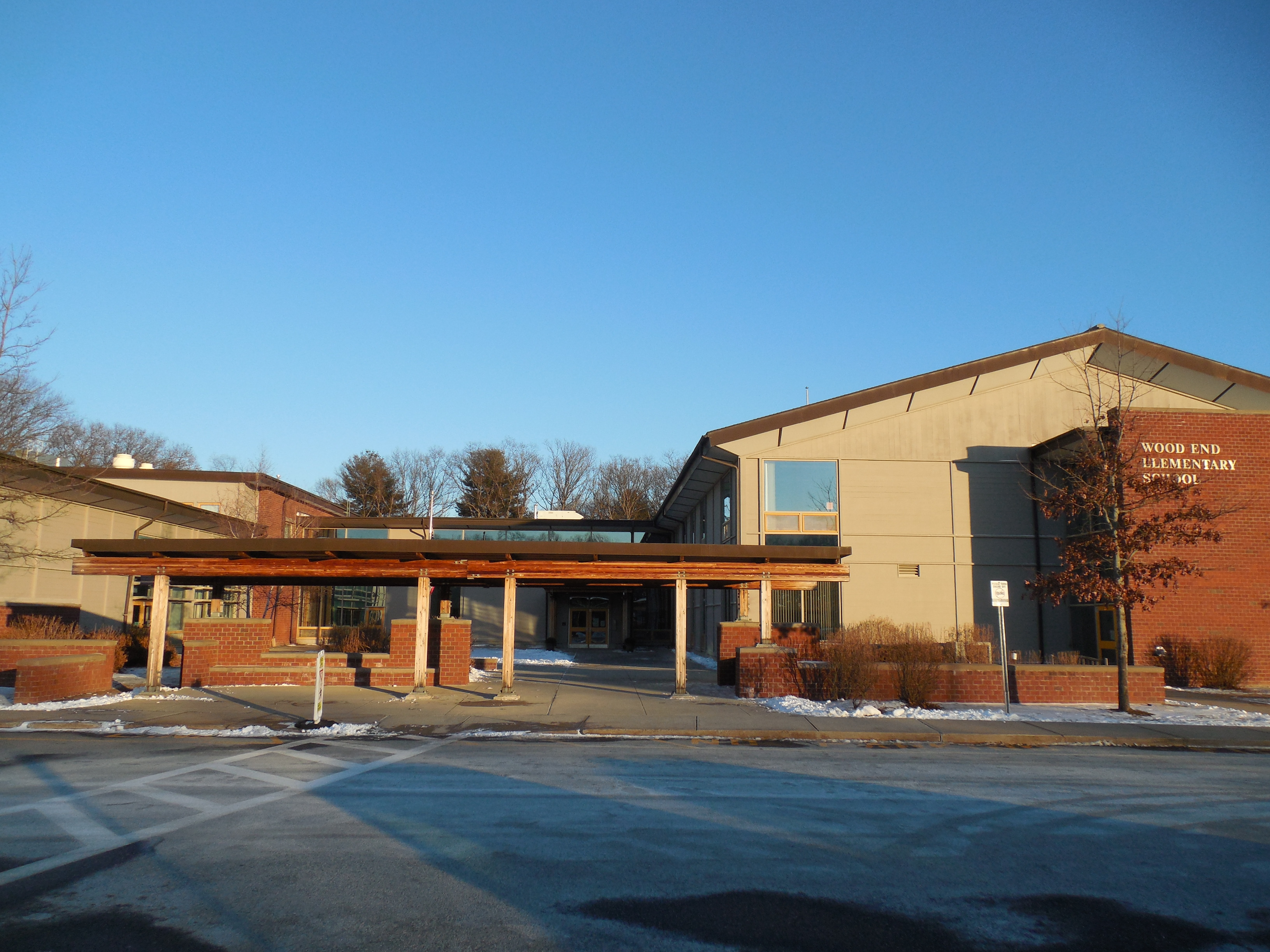

Location
- 85 Sunset Rock Lane; Reading, Middlesex County, Massachusetts 01867; United States; 42°33′05.00″N 71°06′58.93″W

Information
- Status: Open
- School district: Reading Public Schools
- NCES District ID: 2509990
- School code: MA-0246-02460020
- NCES School ID: 250999001958
- Principal: Nicole Schwartz
- Faculty: 21.77 (on an FTE basis)
- Grades: K–5
- Enrollment: 246 (2022–23)
  - Kindergarten: 34
  - Grade 1: 44
  - Grade 2: 30
  - Grade 3: 49
  - Grade 4: 48
  - Grade 5: 41
- Student to teacher ratio: 11.30:1
- Website: woodend.reading.k12.ma.us

Wood End School is an elementary school (grades K-5) in Reading, Massachusetts, United States. There were 246 students in grades K–5 and 21 staff members in 2022. The school was recognized in 2008 as a "Beacon of Light" school by the Blue Ribbon School of Excellence Program.
