= House at 23 Lawrence Street =

Historic house in Massachusetts, United States

- U.S. National Register of Historic Places
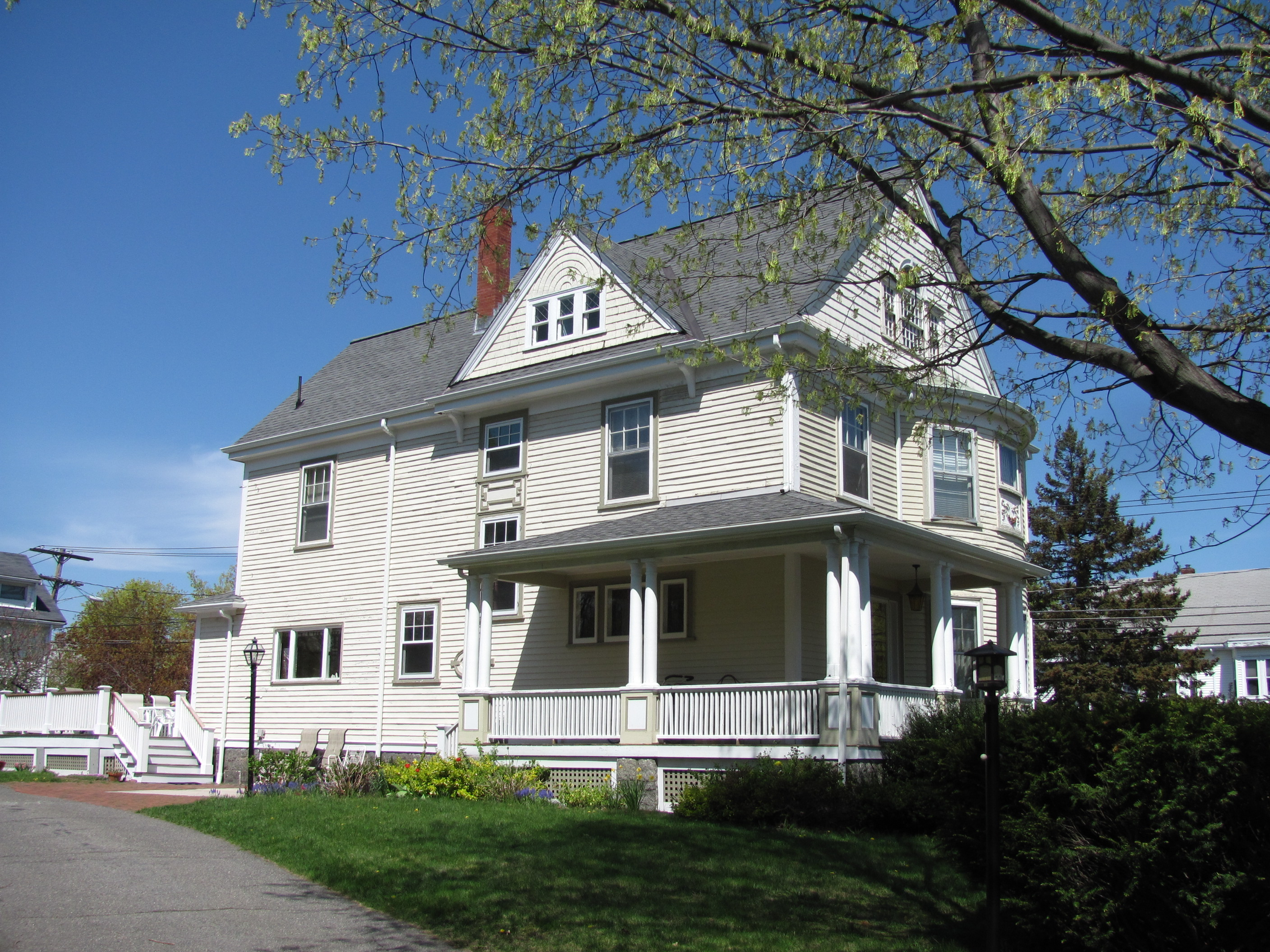
- House at 23 Lawrence Street

- Location within Massachusetts Location within the United States
- Location: 23 Lawrence St., Wakefield, Massachusetts
- Coordinates: 42°30′40″N 71°4′10″W
- Area: less than one acre
- Built: 1896
- Architectural style: Colonial Revival
- MPS: Wakefield MRA
- NRHP reference No.: 89000681
- Added to NRHP: July 06, 1989

The House at 23 Lawrence Street in Wakefield, Massachusetts is a good example of a late 19th-century high-style Colonial Revival house. Built in the late 1890s, it was listed on the National Register of Historic Places in 1989.

== Description and history ==
Lawrence Street is located north of downtown Wakefield, extending east from Main Street toward Vernon Street at the southern end of Lake Quannapowitt. This house stands on the north side, at the northwest corner with Pleasant Street. It is a 2½-story wood-frame structure, with a gabled roof and clapboarded exterior. Its front facade, facing Lawrence Street, has a round corner bay and a wraparound porch supported by paired columns atop paneled piers. The main gable is filled with a Palladian window. The facade facing Pleasant Street has a single-story rounded bay with a small central window above a panel with a swag at the center. The roof on this side is pierced by two large cross gables, each with half-round windows at their centers.

Lawrence Street was laid out in 1857, but was not platted for development until 1874, a boom period of development in Wakefield. James Emerson, owner of one of the city's largest shoe factories, partnered with another businessman to build out the street's lots. Emerson's family homestead (now demolished) stood at the corner of Lawrence and Main Streets, as did its first shoe factory. This house was built in the late 1890s, based on style and period maps, and probably replaced an older house that was recorded as standing here in 1857.

== See also ==
- House at 15 Lawrence Street
- House at 20 Lawrence Street
- National Register of Historic Places listings in Wakefield, Massachusetts
- National Register of Historic Places listings in Middlesex County, Massachusetts
