= House at 15 Lawrence Street =

Historic house in Massachusetts, United States

- U.S. National Register of Historic Places
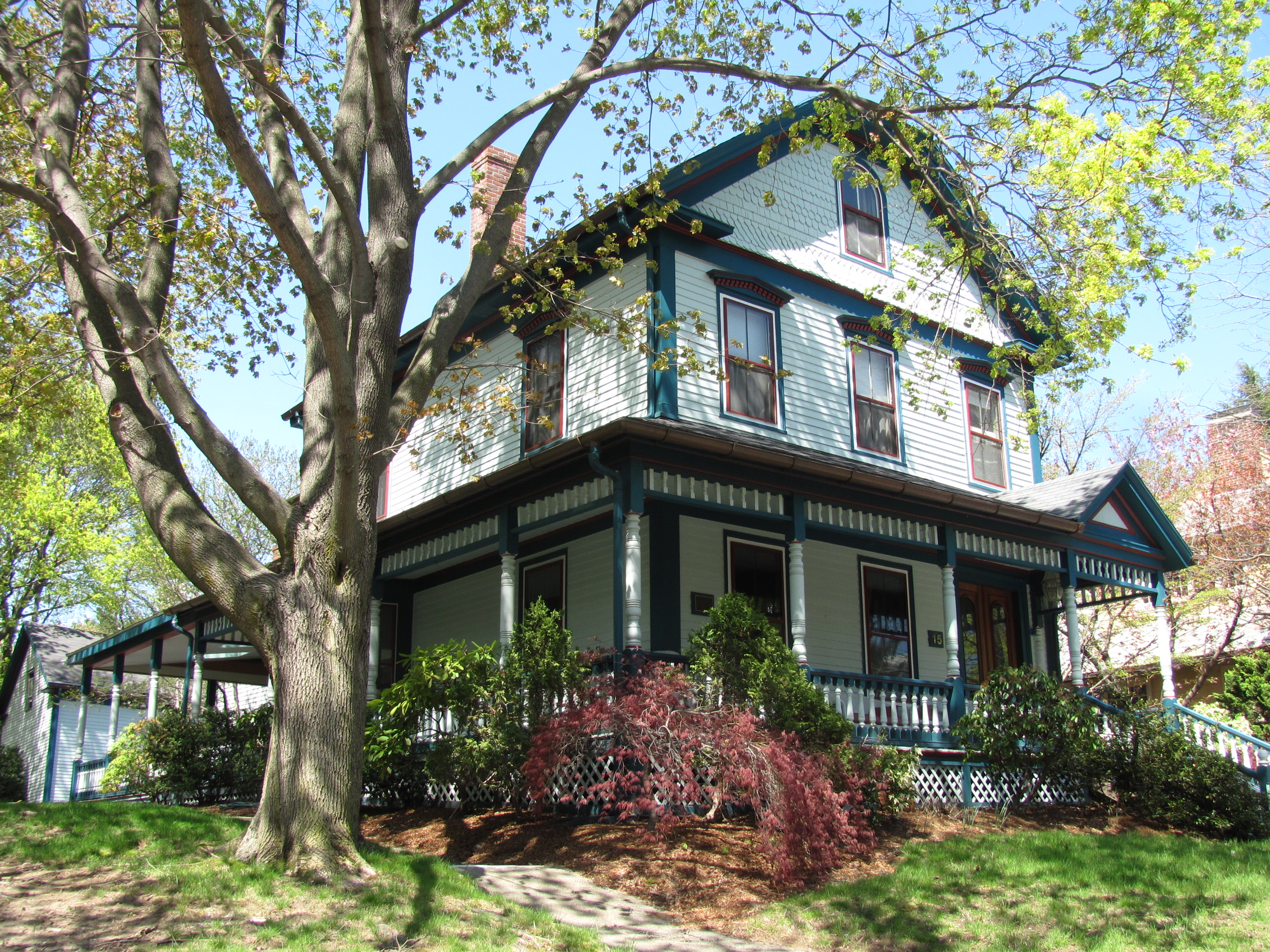
- House at 15 Lawrence Street

- Location within Massachusetts Location within the United States
- Location: 15 Lawrence Street., Wakefield, Massachusetts
- Coordinates: 42°30′37″N 71°4′14″W
- Area: less than one acre
- Built: 1870; 156 years ago
- Architectural style: Queen Anne
- MPS: Wakefield MRA
- NRHP reference No.: 89000682
- Added to NRHP: July 06, 1989

The House at 15 Lawrence Street in Wakefield, Massachusetts is a well-preserved Queen Anne house with a locally rare surviving carriage house. It was built in the early 1870s, and was listed on the National Register of Historic Places in 1989.

== Description and history ==
Lawrence Street is located north of downtown Wakefield, extending east from Main Street toward Vernon Street at the southern end of Lake Quannapowitt. This house stands on the north side of the westernmost block, its lot fringed by low retaining walls, with granite posts flanking the driveway entrance. The house is 2 1/2 stories in height, with a front-facing clipped gable roof, and an exterior finished in a combination of wooden clapboards and decorative cut shingles. It is basically rectangular in plan, with a single-story hip-roofed porch extending across the front and around part of the left side. The porch features turned posts, a decorative valance, and turned balustrades. Second floor windows are topped by shallow gables, and there is a round-arch window in the gable above. The original carriage barn stands behind the house, also exhibiting original Queen Anne styling.

Lawrence Street was laid out in 1857, but was not platted for development until 1874, a boom period of development in Wakefield. James Emerson, owner of one of the city's largest shoe factories, partnered with another businessman to build out the street's lots. Emerson's family homestead (now demolished) stood at the corner of Lawrence and Main Streets, as did its first shoe factory. The house was written up in a local newspaper for its architecture in 1894.

== See also ==
- House at 20 Lawrence Street
- House at 23 Lawrence Street
- National Register of Historic Places listings in Wakefield, Massachusetts
- National Register of Historic Places listings in Middlesex County, Massachusetts
