= House at 18A and 20 Aborn Street =

Historic house in Massachusetts, United States

- House at 18A and 20 Aborn Avenue
- U.S. National Register of Historic Places
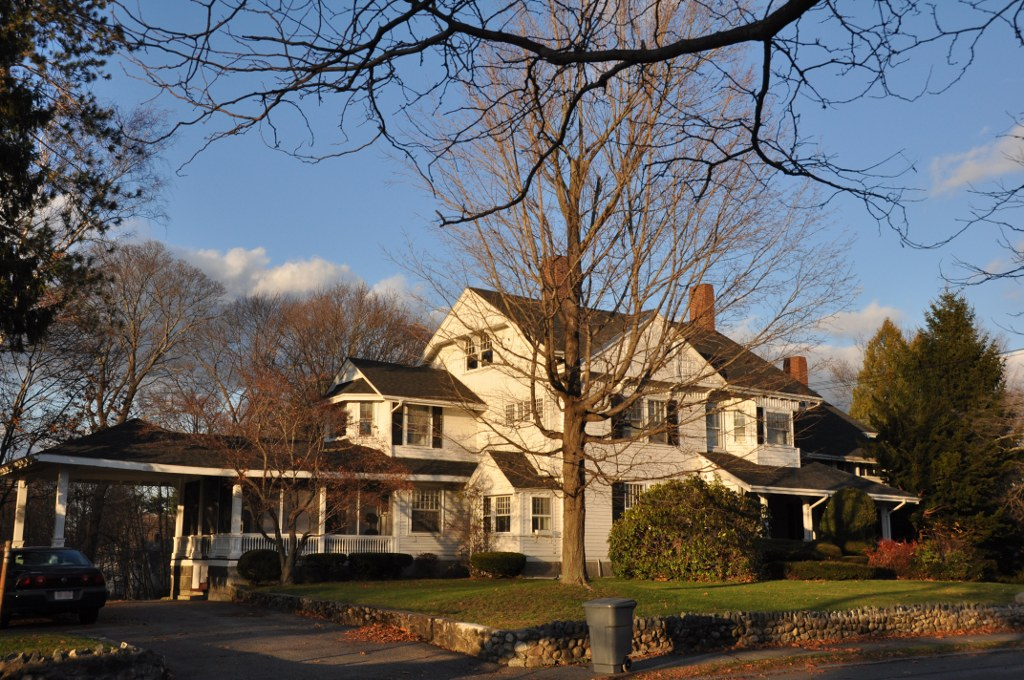

- Location within Massachusetts Location within the United States
- Location: 18A and 20 Aborn Ave., Wakefield, Massachusetts
- Coordinates: 42°30′45″N 71°4′20″W
- Area: 1.1 acres (0.45 ha)
- Built: 1883
- Architectural style: Queen Anne
- MPS: Wakefield MRA
- NRHP reference No.: 89000676
- Added to NRHP: July 06, 1989

The House at 18A and 20 Aborn Avenue in Wakefield, Massachusetts is a historic house and carriage house with elaborate Queen Anne styling. It was built in the mid-1880s, and is one of the most ornate houses in the neighborhood. The property was listed on the National Register of Historic Places in 1989.

== Description and history ==
Aborn Avenue is located northeast of downtown Wakefield, and is a short street in a residential neighborhood just east of Lake Quannapowitt. The house is a 2 1/2-story wood-frame structure, set on a rise above a fieldstone retaining wall. It has irregular massing typical of the Queen Anne period. Its main part has a rough L shape, but it is studded with porches, bay windows, and an extended porte cochere. Several architectural details appear in several places, including gable sections that project slightly over the main wall surface below, and vertically laid trim below some of the cornices. The former carriage house, which has been fully converted for residential use, carries through some of these details.

Aborn Avenue was originally part of a larger property owned by John Aborn, a shoemaker who lived in a house west of this one on Main Street. Aborn and his father-in-law John White owned a successful shoe factory. Aborn's heirs laid out Aborn Avenue and adjacent White Avenue in 1857, and the area was developed in the 1860s and 1870s as a residential area for local middle-class businessmen and tradesmen. Based on map records and stylistic analysis, this house was probably built in the mid-1880s.

== See also ==
- National Register of Historic Places listings in Wakefield, Massachusetts
- National Register of Historic Places listings in Middlesex County, Massachusetts
