= House at 20 Lawrence Street =

Historic house in Massachusetts, United States

- U.S. National Register of Historic Places
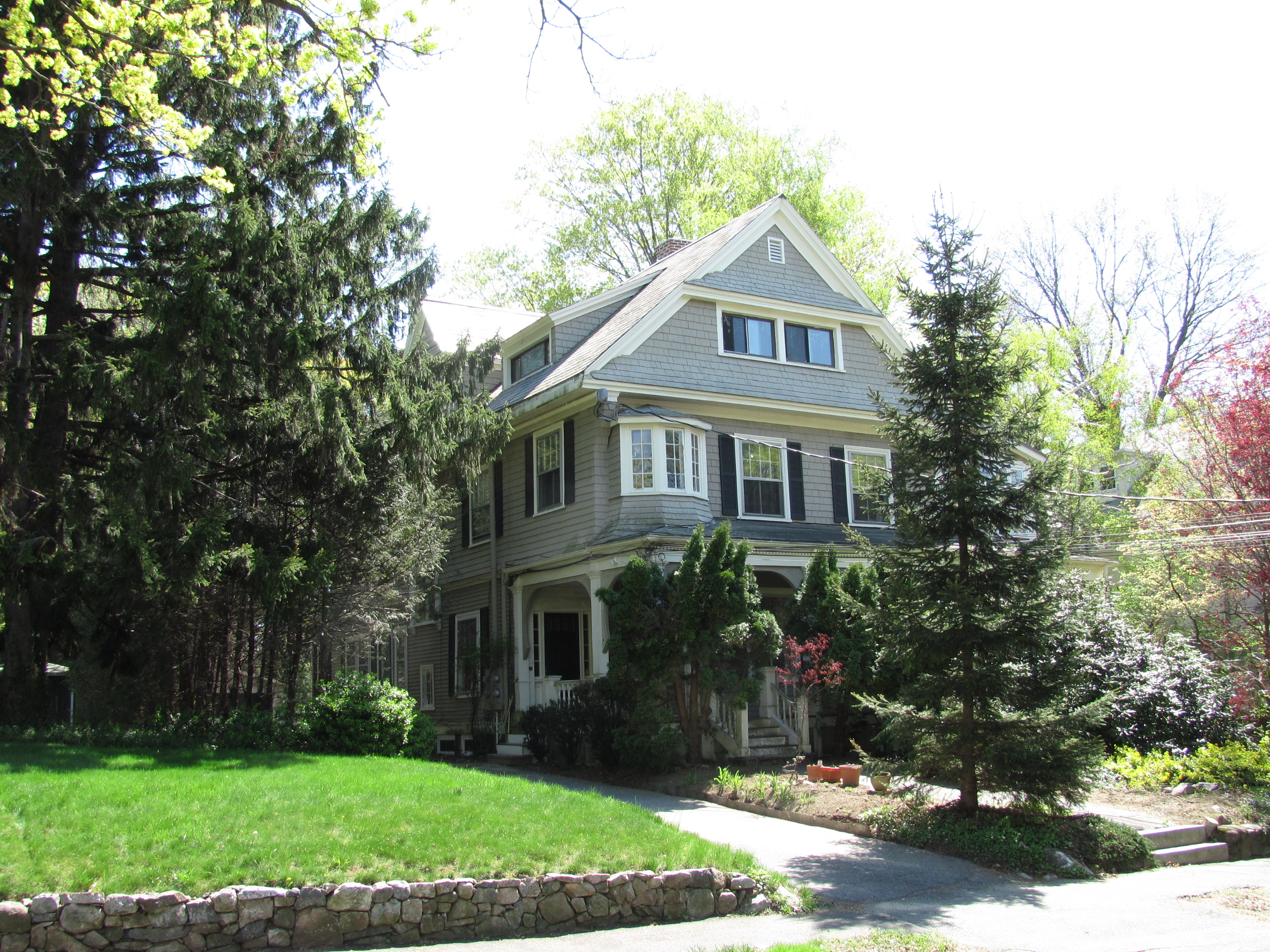
- House at 20 Lawrence Street

- Location within Massachusetts Location within the United States
- Location: 20 Lawrence St., Wakefield, Massachusetts, U.S.
- Coordinates: 42°30′36″N 71°4′11″W
- Area: less than one acre
- Built: 1880
- Architectural style: Queen Anne
- MPS: Wakefield MRA
- NRHP reference No.: 89000680
- Added to NRHP: July 06, 1989

The House at 20 Lawrence Street in Wakefield, Massachusetts is a complex residential structure with elements of Queen Anne, Stick style, and Colonial Revival style. Built about 1880, it was listed on the National Register of Historic Places in 1989.

== Description and history ==
Lawrence Street is located north of downtown Wakefield, extending east from Main Street toward Vernon Street at the southern end of Lake Quannapowitt. This house stands on the south side of the westernmost block. It is a 2 1/2-story wood frames structure, with an L plan, cross-gabled roof, and exterior finished in a combination of wooden clapboards and decorative cut shingles. Portions of the exterior have applied Stick style decorative woodwork. The wraparound porch, Colonial Revival in style, has been partially enclosed. The main gable is filled with two-slope wooden shingles, a common feature of area 1880s houses.

Lawrence Street was laid out in 1857, but was not platted for development until 1874, a boom period of development in Wakefield. James Emerson, owner of one of the city's largest shoe factories, partnered with another businessman to build out the street's lots. Emerson's family homestead (now demolished) stood at the corner of Lawrence and Main Streets, as did its first shoe factory. This house was probably built about 1879 or 1880 by Edwin Miller, the son of Henry F. Miller, a local piano manufacturer. The younger Miller continued in his father's business, and was active in local politics, serving in the state legislature for one term.

== See also ==
- House at 15 Lawrence Street
- House at 23 Lawrence Street
- National Register of Historic Places listings in Wakefield, Massachusetts
- National Register of Historic Places listings in Middlesex County, Massachusetts
