= Dr. Thomas Simpson House =

Historic house in Massachusetts, United States

- U.S. National Register of Historic Places
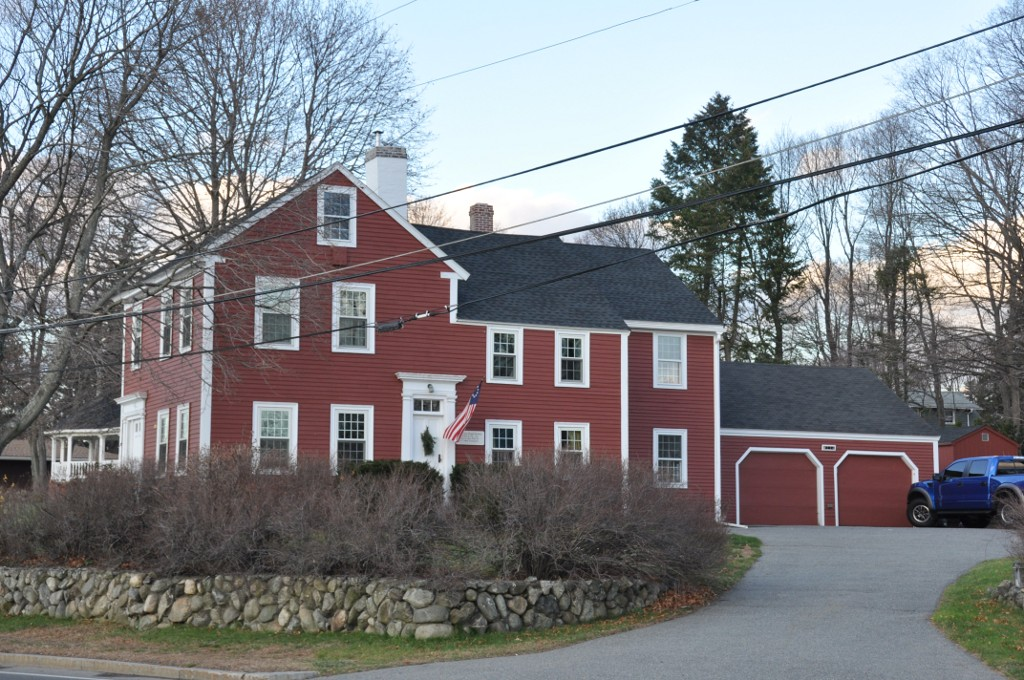

- Location within Massachusetts Location within the United States
- Location: 114 Main St., Wakefield, Massachusetts
- Coordinates: 42°31′6″N 71°4′35″W
- Area: less than one acre
- Built: 1750
- Architectural style: Georgian, Federal
- MPS: Wakefield MRA
- NRHP reference No.: 89000665
- Added to NRHP: July 06, 1989

The Dr. Thomas Simpson House is a historic house at 114 Main Street in Wakefield, Massachusetts. It is a 2 1/2-story timber-frame house, in a local variant of Georgian style that is three bays wide and four deep, with a side gable roof. Its primary entrance, facing west toward Lake Quannapowitt, has sidelight windows and pilasters supporting an entablature, while a secondary south-facing entrance has the same styling, except with a transom window instead of sidelights. The core of this house was built by Dr. Thomas Simpson sometime before 1750, and has been added onto several times. It was restyled in the Federal period, when the door surrounds would have been added.

The house was listed on the National Register of Historic Places in 1989.

== See also ==
- National Register of Historic Places listings in Wakefield, Massachusetts
- National Register of Historic Places listings in Middlesex County, Massachusetts
