= House at 11 Wave Avenue =

Historic house in Massachusetts, United States

- U.S. National Register of Historic Places
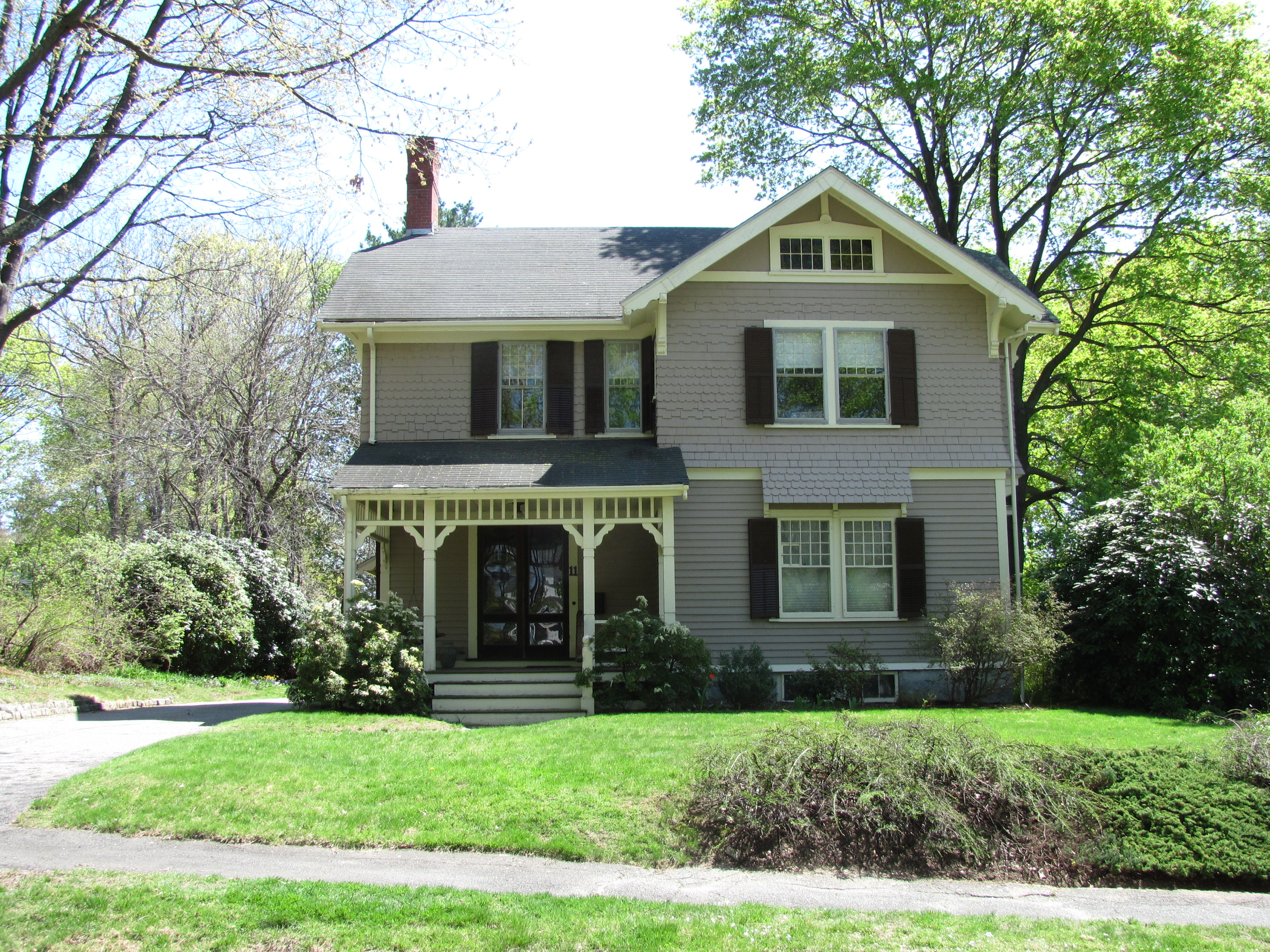
- House at 11 Wave Avenue

- Location within Massachusetts Location within the United States
- Location: 11 Wave Ave., Wakefield, Massachusetts
- Coordinates: 42°30′40″N 71°4′15″W
- Area: less than one acre
- Built: 1875
- Architectural style: Stick/Eastlake, Queen Anne
- MPS: Wakefield MRA
- NRHP reference No.: 89000678
- Added to NRHP: July 06, 1989

The House at 11 Wave Avenue in Wakefield, Massachusetts is a well-preserved example of Queen Anne/Stick-style architecture. Built between 1875 and 1888, it was listed on the National Register of Historic Places in 1989.

== Description and history ==
Wave Avenue is located north of downtown Wakefield, and is a two-block residential street just east of Lake Quannapowitt. This house is set on the south side of the street, facing north on a lot that slopes down west toward the lake. It is a 2 1/2-story wood-frame structure, with a gabled roof and clapboarded exterior. It is basically L-shaped, with a cross-gable roof and a porch in the crook of the L. It has Stick style decoration in its gable ends, with Queen Anne window hoods and bands of wavy cut shingles on the second floor. Its front porch is supported by square columns with brackets and a decorative valance.

The land on which this house was built previously belonged to Thomas Emerson, owner of one of Wakefield's major shoe manufactories, located downtown at Main and Yale Streets. Emerson was also active in local politics, serving in many town offices and in the state legislature. Emerson died in 1871, and his heirs laid out Wave Avenue for development. This house was built sometime between 1875 and 1888, based on analysis of period maps. Residents of this area included both the management and workers of local shoe factories.

== See also ==
- House at 15 Wave Avenue, next door
- National Register of Historic Places listings in Wakefield, Massachusetts
- National Register of Historic Places listings in Middlesex County, Massachusetts
