= Beacon Street Tomb =

- U.S. National Register of Historic Places
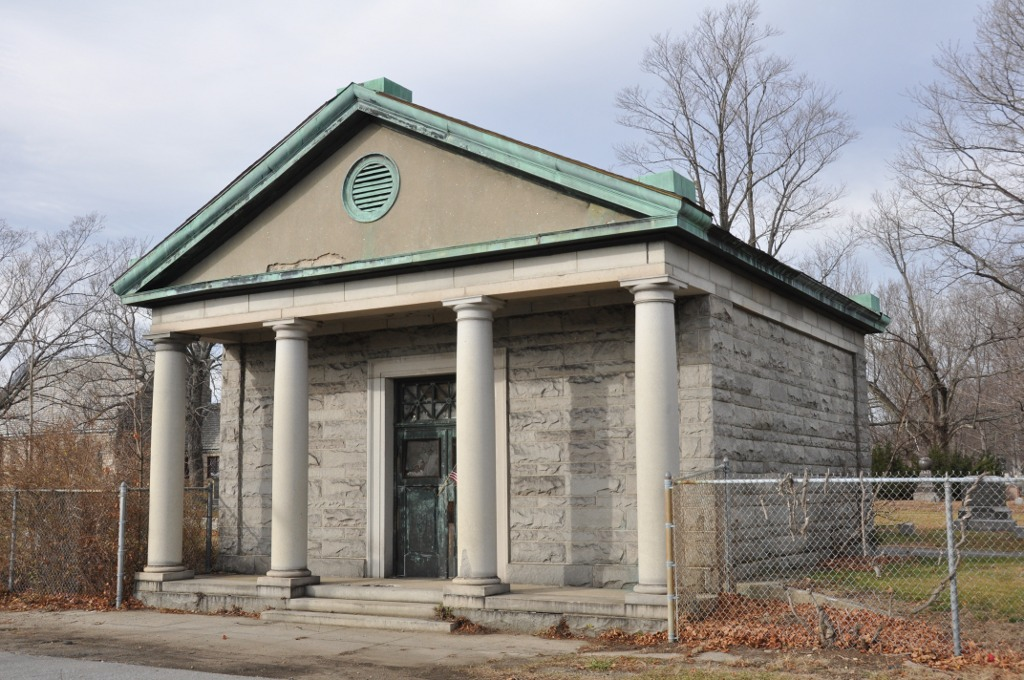

- Location within Massachusetts Location within the United States
- Location: Beacon St., Lakeside Cemetery, Wakefield, Massachusetts
- Coordinates: 42°30′35″N 71°4′50″W
- Area: less than one acre
- Built: 1858
- Architectural style: Greek Revival
- MPS: Wakefield MRA
- NRHP reference No.: 89000714
- Added to NRHP: July 6, 1989

The Beacon Street Tomb is a historic receiving tomb in the Lakeside Cemetery of Wakefield, Massachusetts. Built about 1858, it is one of the finest examples of Greek Revival architecture. It was listed on the National Register of Historic Places in 1989.

== Description and history ==
The Beacon Street tomb is located on the south side of Lakeside Cemetery, itself set on the west side of Lake Quannapowitt. It faces south, away from the cemetery and toward Beacon Street, which runs along the cemetery's southern border. It is a single-story stone structure, built out of ashlar granite and covered by a front-facing gabled roof. The front facade is defined by four Doric columns, which rise to a fully pedimented gable, which has a louvered oculus window at its center. There are no windows, and a double-leaf door on the southern elevation.

Lakeview Cemetery was established in 1848, on land previously owned by an ice harvesting company that operated on the lake in winter. This building, built sometime between 1858 and 1860, was used to store caskets during the winter months when burial was impossible due to frozen ground. It was used in this role until the 20th century.

== See also ==
- National Register of Historic Places listings in Wakefield, Massachusetts
- National Register of Historic Places listings in Middlesex County, Massachusetts
