= Mollie Sweetser =

American politician

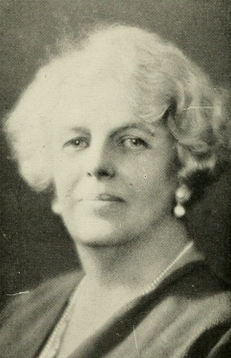

Member of the Massachusetts House of Representatives from the 18th Middlesex district
- In office 1933–1936

Personal details
- Born: Mollie Ashby Sweetser

Mollie Ashby Sweetser was an American politician from Reading, Massachusetts. She represented the 18th Middlesex district in the Massachusetts House of Representatives from 1933 to 1936.
