= Parker Tavern =

- U.S. National Register of Historic Places
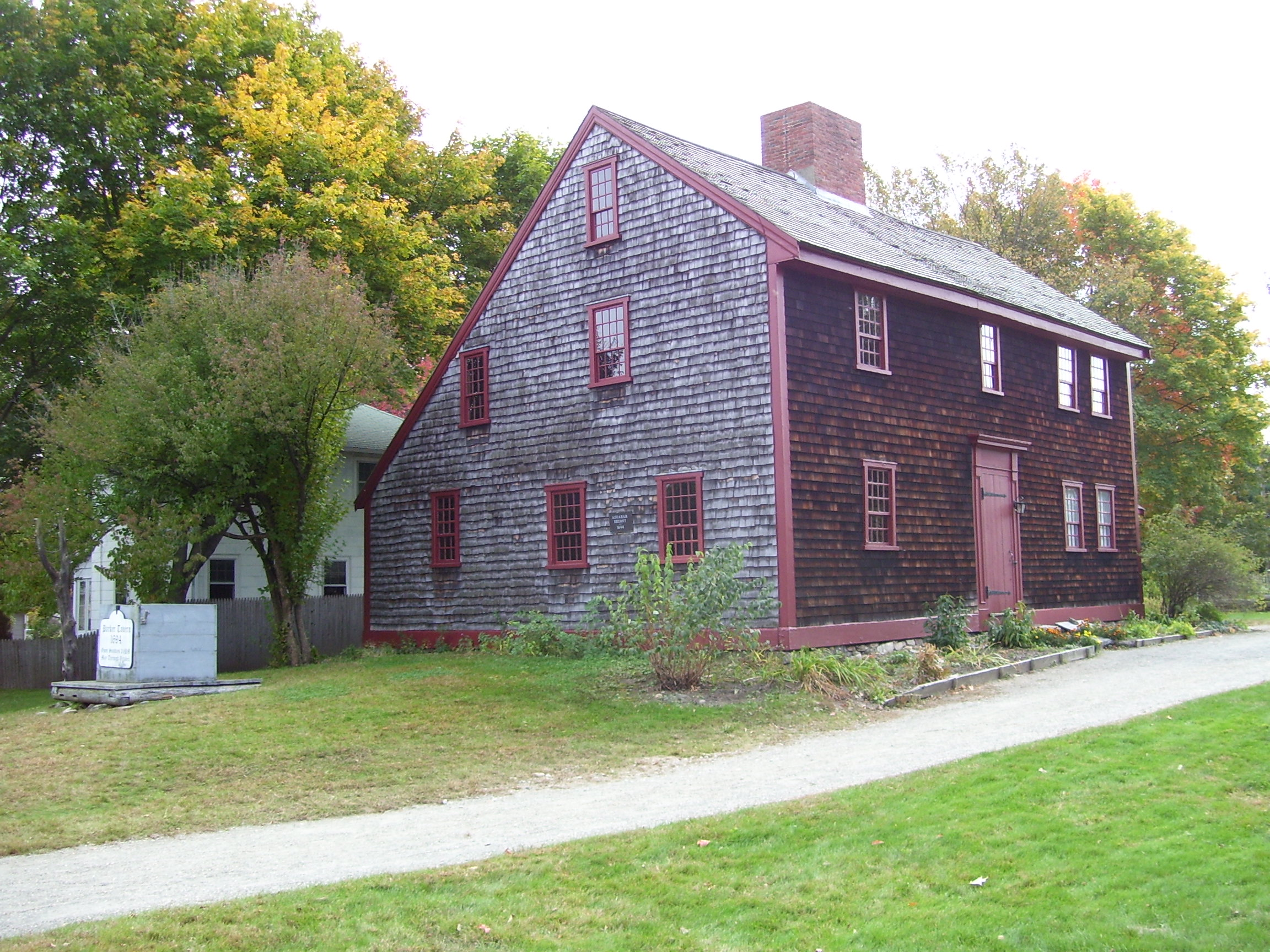
- Parker Tavern in 2008

- Location within Massachusetts Location within the United States
- Location: 103 Washington Street, Reading, Massachusetts
- Coordinates: 42°31′14.75″N 71°6′24.18″W
- Built: 1694
- Architectural style: Colonial
- MPS: Reading MRA (AD)
- NRHP reference No.: 75000286
- Added to NRHP: August 19, 1975

The Parker Tavern is a historic house museum in Reading, Massachusetts, United States. Built in 1694, it is the oldest extant structure in Reading. The saltbox was built by Abraham Bryant, a farmer and blacksmith, and Ephraim Parker operated a tavern on the premises in the 18th century. It has been a local history museum since 1923, and was listed on the National Register of Historic Places in 1975.

== Description and history ==
The Parker Tavern is located on the south side of Washington Street, west of Main Street and a short way south of the Reading MBTA station. It is set near the back of a level, grassy lot, and faces west. It is a 2 1/2-story wood-frame structure, with a side-gable roof, wooden-shingle siding, and a granite foundation. The front facade is four bays wide, with two windows to the left of the entrance and one to the right. The door and window surrounds are plain. The building has an integral leanto at the rear, giving it a classic New England saltbox appearance.

In 1693 Abraham Bryant, a blacksmith, acquired the land on which the house stands, and was taxed a substantially larger amount the following year, suggesting the house was built by 1694. His heirs remained in the house until the 1730s, after which it was owned by Ebenezer Nichols, a tanner prominent in the civic affairs of the town. Ephraim Parker, the great-grandson of Thomas Parker, who was one of the founders of Reading, was the next owner, living here until his death in 1804. Parker was licensed to operate a tavern on the premises between 1770 and 1785. He served in the Battle of Lexington and Concord at the start of the American Revolutionary War, and hosted as a prisoner of war Colonel Archibald Campbell, whose regiment had been captured aboard ship in Boston Harbor in 1776. Campbell remained at the tavern until 1778, when he was exchanged for Ethan Allen.

For most of the 19th century the house was owned by the Sweetser family. It was acquired by the town in 1916, and sold to the Reading Antiquarian Society in 1923 for a nominal sum. The society has since operated the property as a historic house museum, generally open on Sundays from 2 to 5 pm between May and October.

== See also ==
- List of the oldest buildings in Massachusetts
- National Register of Historic Places listings in Reading, Massachusetts
- National Register of Historic Places listings in Middlesex County, Massachusetts
