= House at 15 Wave Avenue =

Historic house in Massachusetts, United States

- U.S. National Register of Historic Places
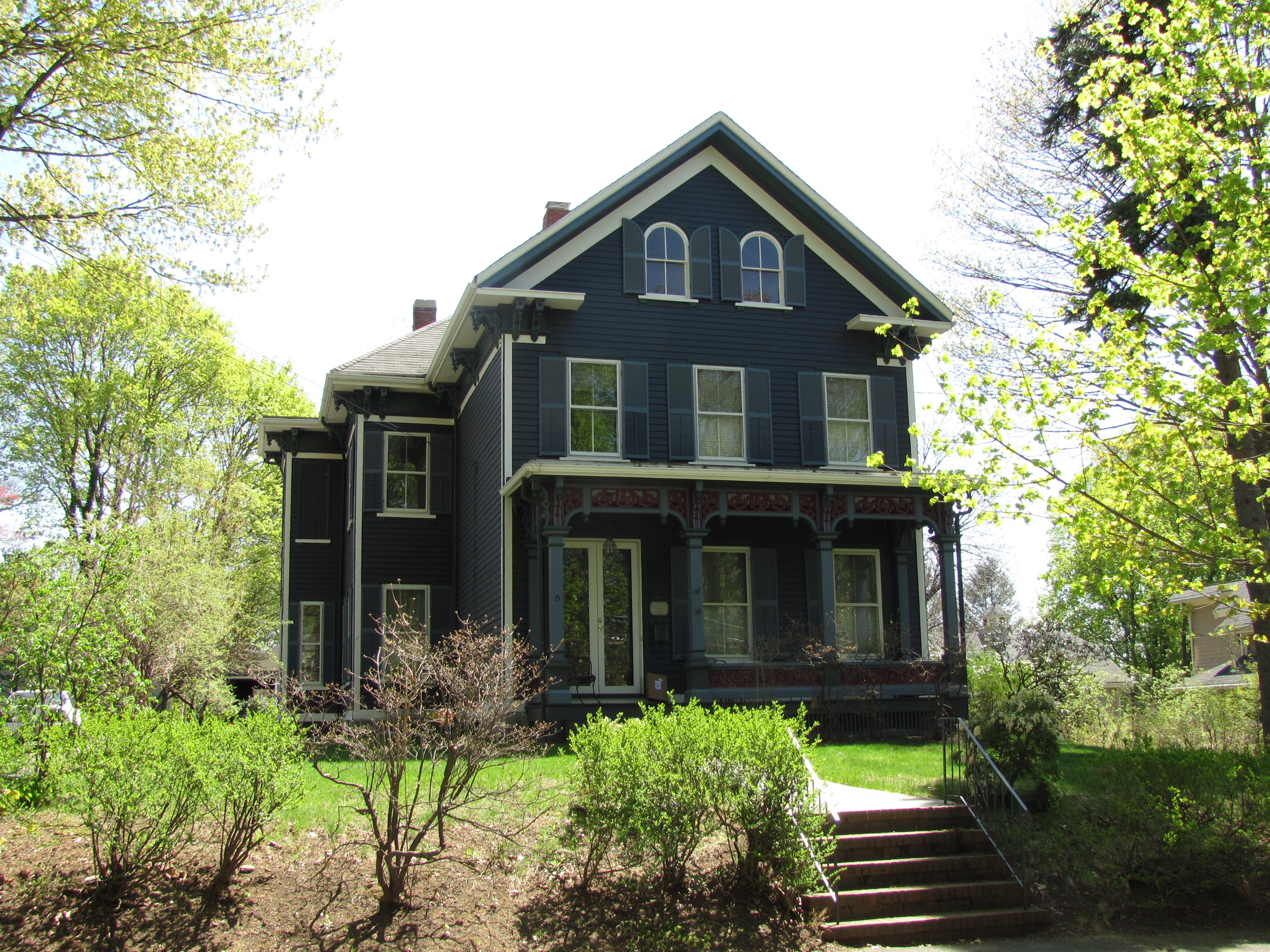
- House at 15 Wave Avenue

- Location within Massachusetts Location within the United States
- Location: 15 Wave Ave., Wakefield, Massachusetts
- Coordinates: 42°30′40″N 71°4′14″W
- Area: less than one acre
- Built: 1875
- Architectural style: Italianate
- MPS: Wakefield MRA
- NRHP reference No.: 89000679
- Added to NRHP: July 06, 1989

15 Wave Avenue is a well-preserved Italianate style house in Wakefield, Massachusetts. It was built between 1875 and 1883, and was listed on the National Register of Historic Places on July 6, 1989.

== Description and history ==
Wave Avenue is located north of downtown Wakefield, and is a two-block residential street just east of Lake Quannapowitt. This house is set on the south side of the street, facing north on a lot that slopes down west toward the lake. It is a 2 1/2-story wood-frame structure, with a front-facing gabled roof and clapboarded exterior. A two-story ell projects to rear, offset slightly to the left side. Its main facade is three bays wide, with the entrance in the leftmost bay. A single-story porch extends across the front supported by square posts with jigsawn brackets and valances. The front gable houses a pair of round-arch windows, and the roofs extended eaves are studded with paired decorative brackets.

The land on which this house was built previously belonged to Thomas Emerson, owner of one of Wakefield's major shoe manufactories, located downtown at Main and Yale Streets. Emerson was also active in local politics, serving in many town offices and in the state legislature. Emerson died in 1871, and his heirs laid out Wave Avenue for development. This house was built sometime between 1875 and 1883, based on analysis of period maps. Residents of this area included both the management and workers of local shoe factories, and one shoe factory, that of Henry Haskell, stood at the foot of Wave Avenue.

== See also ==
- House at 11 Wave Avenue, next door
- National Register of Historic Places listings in Wakefield, Massachusetts
- National Register of Historic Places listings in Middlesex County, Massachusetts
