= To a Southern Slaveholder =

1848 essay by Theodore Parker

"To a Southern Slaveholder" was a 1848 anti-slavery essay written by the Unitarian minister Theodore Parker, as the abolition movement was developing in the United States.

The essay's tone was akin to someone correcting someone else about a fact they got wrong. Parker wrote several times that he was not trying to antagonize enslavers; instead, he was their friend.

Parker points out flaws in proslavery thought regarding Biblical endorsement of slavery. Parker argued that African Americans were not descendants of Noah's son Ham, cursed by his father to be enslaved. Parker wrote that even though the Old Testament allows slavery, the New Testament ended such justifications.
