= Moral arc of history =

Belief that justice prevails in society

The moral arc of history is a belief that, over the course of human history, positive societal outcomes eventually win out over negative ones. The idea was popularized by Martin Luther King Jr. in his 1965 How Long, Not Long speech, though King was quoting 19th century Unitarian minister Theodore Parker. King's formulation, and the most frequently quoted, is "The arc of the moral universe is long, but it bends towards justice."

== History ==
Theodore Parker, an abolitionist, gave an 1853 sermon in which he said:

I do not pretend to understand the moral universe. The arc is a long one. My eye reaches but little ways. I cannot calculate the curve and complete the figure by experience of sight. I can divine it by conscience. And from what I see I am sure it bends toward justice.

Martin Luther King Jr., in his 1965 How Long, Not Long speech during the civil rights movement, simplified Parker's sermon and said:

How long? Not long, because the arc of the moral universe is long, but it bends toward justice.

King used Parker's quote in other speeches, and might have even used it before his How Long speech, as he tended to attribute quotes he took from other ministers when he first used them, but he did not attribute Parker in How Long. However, his How Long speech was recorded and widely known, and became the leading example of the moral arc quote.

The quote became a favorite of President Barack Obama, who even had the phrase woven into a rug in the White House.

== Interpretation ==
Chris Hayes, writing for NBC's Think assessed that the moral arc of history is an optimistic belief that reflects a fundamental faith in humanity. In short, humanity may make missteps (such as slavery or Jim Crow), but eventually corrects them. Hayes commented that the idea had particular traction in American political thought. However, he ultimately criticized the idea for fostering complacency, pointed to many counterexamples, and concluded that "Nothing bends towards justice without us bending it."
