= Kate McCulley =

American influencer

- Born: August 2, 1984 (age 42); Boston, Massachusetts
- Education: Fairfield University
- Occupation: Travel Blogger
- Website: adventurouskate.com

Kate McCulley (born August 2, 1984) is an American travel blogger under the name Adventurous Kate who seeks to inspire women to travel independently. According to Forbes, she was one of the top influencers in her field in 2017. McCulley has travelled to all seven continents, 83 of 195 countries, 28 of 50 U.S. states, plus the District of Columbia, and 159 of 1121 UNESCO World Heritage Sites.

== Early life and education ==
McCulley was born in 1984 in Boston, and raised in Reading, Massachusetts, graduating from Reading Memorial High School in 2002. She went on to graduate from Fairfield University where she achieved her B.A. in English/ creative writing.

== Career ==
After graduating from Fairfield University in 2005, McCulley worked for Dogwood as an Associate Editor in Fiction. She later built a career in online marketing, working for companies such as Circles, Cheapflights and Catalyst Online.

In September 2010, at the age of 26, McCulley quit her job to travel Southeast Asia for six months, where she started her online blogging website and which transitioned into her full time career.

In March 2011, McCulley survived a shipwreck off of the island of Komodo. McCulley has portrayed her travel blogging as supporting the idea that women can safely travel alone.

During the COVID-19 lockdowns, McCulley focused on recounting "funny travel stories" and wrote about "relevant topics such as working from home".

In 2021, scholar Tom Nuenen noted that earlier that year, McCulley had "paradoxically" criticized other travel bloggers for contributing to overtourism, as she had remarked that Iceland had become so extensively covered online that "every subject has been written about" and new bloggers added little of value.

== Recognition ==
In 2017, Forbes featured McCulley as one of the top ten travel influencers for her work, and her niche of female solo travel tips and her collaborations with other creators in the field.

Also in 2017, McCulley was listed as one of the top 100 of the best and the brightest Irish-American and Irish-born leaders for her work by Irish America.

In 2018, McCulley was a Nominee within the Travel category during the 10th Annual Shorty Awards.

== Personal life ==
MuCulley moved to Prague in 2020, and lives there with her boyfriend Charlie and their two cats, Lewis and Murray.
