= Reading Memorial High School =

Coordinates: 42°32′4.5″N 71°6′32.7″W

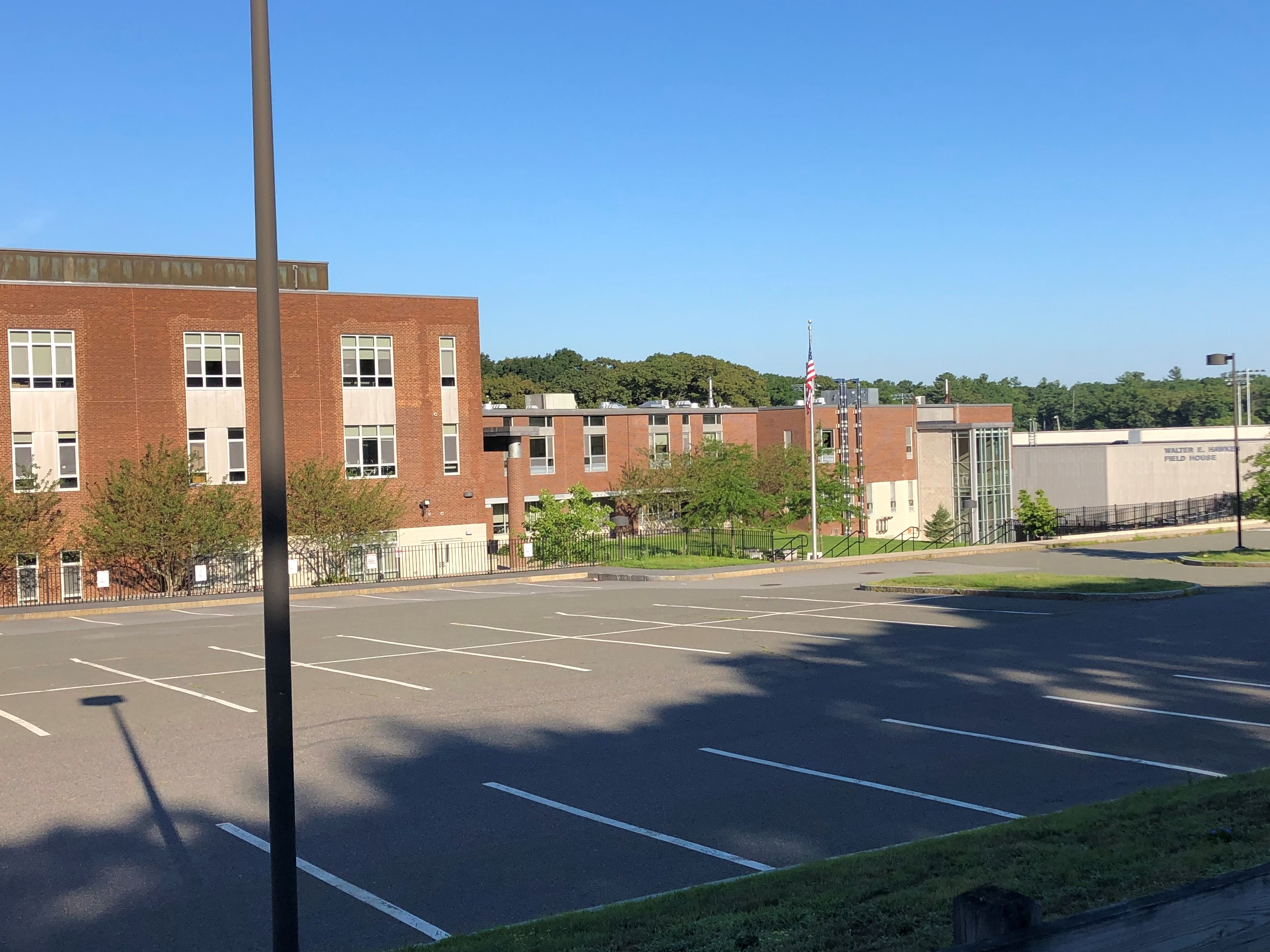

Location
- 62 Oakland Road; Reading, Massachusetts 01867; United States

Information
- Type: Public
- Established: 1954
- School district: Reading Public Schools
- Superintendent: Dr. Thomas Milaschewski
- Principal: Jessica Callanan
- Teaching staff: 85.22 (FTE)
- Grades: 9–12
- Enrollment: 1,097 (2023–2024)
- Student to teacher ratio: 12.87
- Language: English
- Schedule type: Rotating
- Hours in school day: 6.5
- Campus type: Suburban
- Colors: Red and black
- Athletics conference: Middlesex League
- Mascot: Rockets
- Team name: Rockets
- Accreditation: New England Association of Schools and Colleges; Massachusetts Department of Education
- Newspaper: Orbit
- Graduation Rate: 96.9 % (2012)
- MCAS Scores, Grade 10: English: 97% Proficient or higher Math: 96% Proficient or higher
- Website: Reading Memorial High School

Reading Memorial High School (RMHS), overseen by the Reading Public School district, is a four-year high school serving the town of Reading, Massachusetts, United States, as its only public grade 9–12 school. The school had a student body of 1,269 as of 2016 and draws from Reading's Parker and Coolidge Middle Schools. A major building renovation and construction project was completed prior to the 2007–08 academic year. Competing in the Middlesex League, the school's sports teams are called the Rockets. The school's administration includes principal Jessica Callanan.

== Athletics ==
In the Spring of the 1995–96 school year, the Reading Memorial Boys Varsity Baseball team won their first State Championship.

The Reading Memorial High School Girls Basketball program was the 2012 Division II Massachusetts State Champions. Reading Girls basketball capped an undefeated (25–0) 2012 season by defeating Central Champion Tyngsborough at the DCU Center in Worcester on March 17, 2012. This was the first state championship for Reading Memorial High School in the sport of basketball. The following year the team competed for the Eastern Division II Massachusetts State Championship, but fell in overtime to Medfield, 59–51.

On March 16, 2014, the Rockets' boys varsity hockey team won the Division I State Championship over Braintree 4–1 at the TD Garden, their first state championship since winning the Super 8 Championship in 2008.

On March 15, 2015, the Reading girls varsity hockey team won the Division I State Championship over Acton-Boxborough Regional High School 3–0 at the TD Garden, their first in the school's history.

On November 11, 2016, Reading Memorial's varsity football team advanced to their respective playoff division Super Bowl for the second consecutive year after beating Lincoln Sudbury 21–7 in the Division 1A North Final. However, they lost to King Philip High School 21–18 in the Super Bowl at Gillette Stadium, their second consecutive loss in an MIAA Super Bowl. The Rockets' football team has won two of the five Super Bowls they have participated in since 2003, winning in 2009 and 2012. The football team also won Super Bowls in 1993, 1995, 1996, and 1998.

In the fall of 2016 the Reading High School Varsity Girls Swim Team won the Middlesex League Championship and the Division 2 State Championship. The Girls Varsity swim team repeated as League and Division 2 State Champions in 2017 and 2018.

On June 23, 2018, the Rockets' boys varsity lacrosse team won the MIAA Division 2 State Championship, defeating Concord-Carlisle High School, 13–9, at Boston University's Nickerson Field. This was the first state final appearance and championship in the program's history.

== Notable alumni ==
- Max Brallier (RMHS '01), New York Times and USA Today bestselling author. Film Writer/Producer. Creator/Producer "Last Kid's on Earth" Netflix series and Video Game.
- John Doherty (RMHS '69) first baseman-designated hitter, California Angels
- Mark Erelli, folk musician
- Mark Feeney (RMHS '75), Boston Globe arts writer, author of Nixon at the Movies: A Book about Belief (2004), winner Pulitzer Prize for Criticism, 2008
- Kim Janey (RMHS '83), first woman Mayor and first Black Mayor of the City of Boston, former Boston City Councilor
- Danny McBride (RMHS '63), singer-songwriter, best known as guitarist for 1970s rock and roll group Sha Na Na
- Kate McCulley, travel blogger
- Denise A. Spellberg (RMHS '75), associate professor of history, University of Texas at Austin, author of Politics, Gender, and the Islamic Past: The Legacy of 'A'isha Bint Abi Bakr (1994) and Thomas Jefferson's Qur'an: Islam and the Founders (2013)
- Cousin Stizz (RMHS '10), rapper
- Brad Whitford (RMHS '70), best known as guitarist for Aerosmith
