= How Long, Not Long =

1965 speech by Martin Luther King Jr.

"How Long, Not Long" is the popular name given to the public speech delivered by Martin Luther King Jr. on the steps of the State Capitol in Montgomery, Alabama. Martin Luther King Jr. delivered this speech after the completion of the Selma to Montgomery March on March 25, 1965. The speech is also known as "Our God Is Marching On!"

== Key excerpts ==
- "Last Sunday, more than eight thousand of us started on a mighty walk from Selma, Alabama. We have walked through desolate valleys and across the trying hills. We have walked on meandering highways and rested our bodies on rocky byways. Some of our faces are burned from the outpourings of the sweltering sun. Some have literally slept in the mud. We have been drenched by the rains. [Audience:] (Speak) Our bodies are tired and our feet are somewhat sore."
- "Now it is not an accident that one of the great marches of American history should terminate in Montgomery, Alabama. (Yes, sir) Just ten years ago, in this very city, a new philosophy was born of the Negro struggle. Montgomery was the first city in the South in which the entire Negro community united and squarely faced its age-old oppressors. (Yes, sir. Well)"
- "They told us we wouldn't get here. And there were those who said that we would get here only over their dead bodies, (Well. Yes, sir. Talk) but all the world today knows that we are here and we are standing before the forces of power in the state of Alabama saying, "We ain't goin' let nobody turn us around." (Yes, sir. Speak) [Applause]"
- "Once more the method of nonviolent resistance (Yes) was unsheathed from its scabbard, and once again an entire community was mobilized to confront the adversary. (Yes, sir) And again the brutality of a dying order shrieks across the land. Yet, Selma, Alabama, became a shining moment in the conscience of man. If the worst in American life lurked in its dark street, the best of American instincts arose passionately from across the nation to overcome it."
- "The battle is in our hands. And we can answer with creative nonviolence the call to higher ground to which the new directions of our struggle summons us. (Yes, sir) The road ahead is not altogether a smooth one. (No) There are no broad highways that lead us easily and inevitably to quick solutions. But we must keep going."
- "Our aim must never be to defeat or humiliate the white man, but to win his friendship and understanding. We must come to see that the end we seek is a society at peace with itself, a society that can live with its conscience. And that will be a day not of the white man, not of the black man. That will be the day of man as man. (Yes)"
- "I know you are asking today, "How long will it take?" (Speak, sir) Somebody's asking, "How long will prejudice blind the visions of men, darken their understanding, and drive bright-eyed wisdom from her sacred throne?" Somebody's asking, "When will wounded justice, lying prostrate on the streets of Selma and Birmingham and communities all over the South, be lifted from this dust of shame to reign supreme among the children of men?" Somebody's asking, "When will the radiant star of hope be plunged against the nocturnal bosom of this lonely night, (Speak, speak, speak) plucked from weary souls with chains of fear and the manacles of death? How long will justice be crucified, (Speak) and truth buried?" (Yes, sir) I come to say to you this afternoon, however difficult the moment, (Yes, sir) however frustrating the hour, it will not be long, (No sir) because "truth crushed to earth will rise again." (Yes, sir) How long? Not long, (Yes, sir) because "no lie can live forever." (Yes, sir) How long? Not long, (All right. How long) because "you shall reap what you sow." (Yes, sir)"
- "How long? Not long, because the arc of the moral universe is long, but it bends toward justice." This would popularize the idea of the moral arc of history.

== See also ==
- Bibliography of Martin Luther King Jr.
