= Thomas Parker (deacon) =

Thomas Parker (1609–1683) was one of the founders of Reading, Massachusetts, and a deacon and one of the founders of the 12th Congregational Church in Massachusetts (now the First Parish Congregational Church).

== Life ==
Dea. Parker sailed on the Susan and Ellen (1st trip) from London on March 11, 1635, for Massachusetts. He settled first in Lynn, but in 1638 became either the first, or one of the first, settlers of what became the town of Reading. It was first known as Lynn Village, but was incorporated in 1644 as Reading, with a total of seven families living in seven houses. There is evidence that Parker was "conspicuous in naming the town" and that he was related to the Parker family of Little Norton, England, who owned land by the name of Ryddinge.

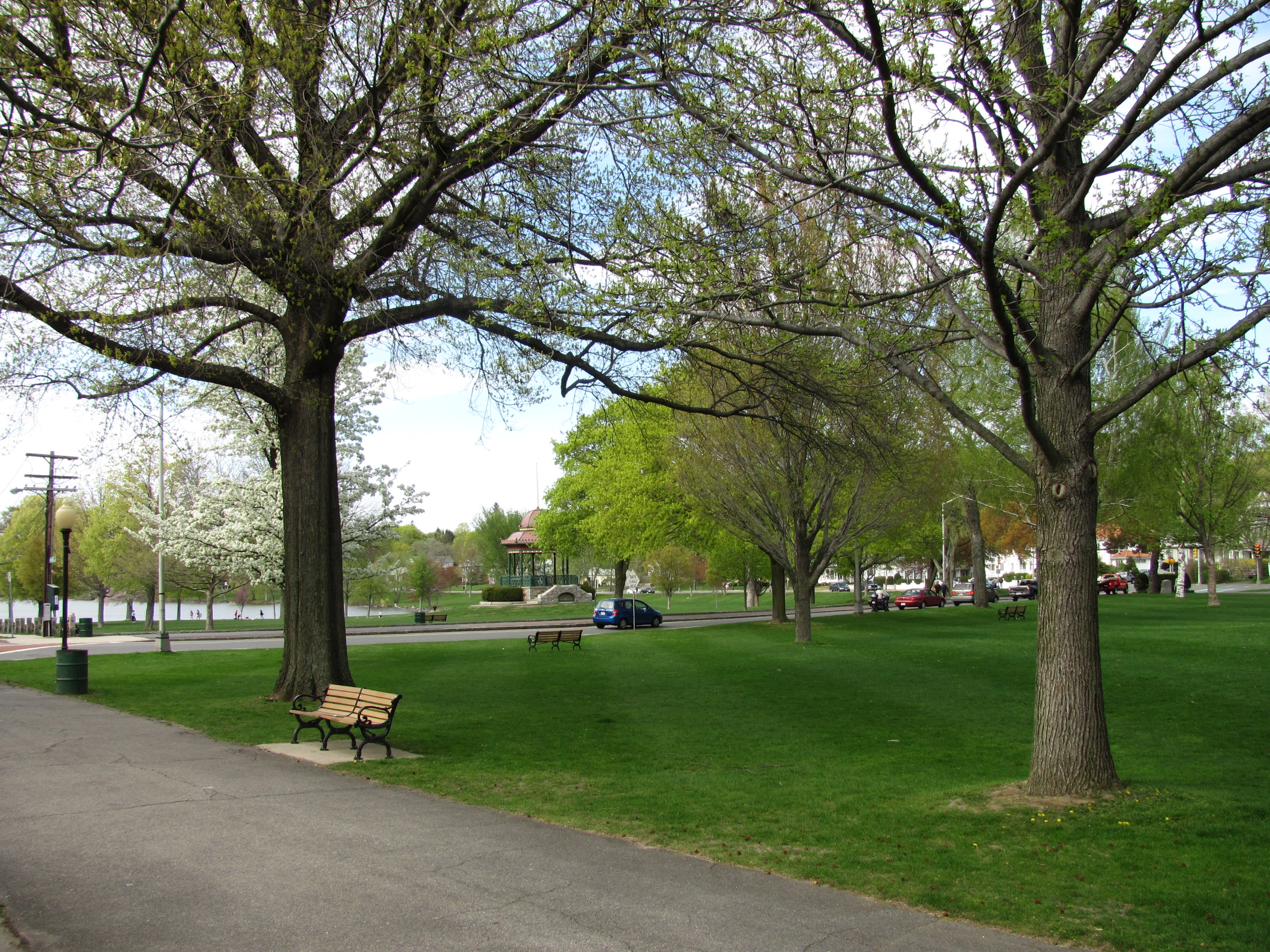
Wakefield Common

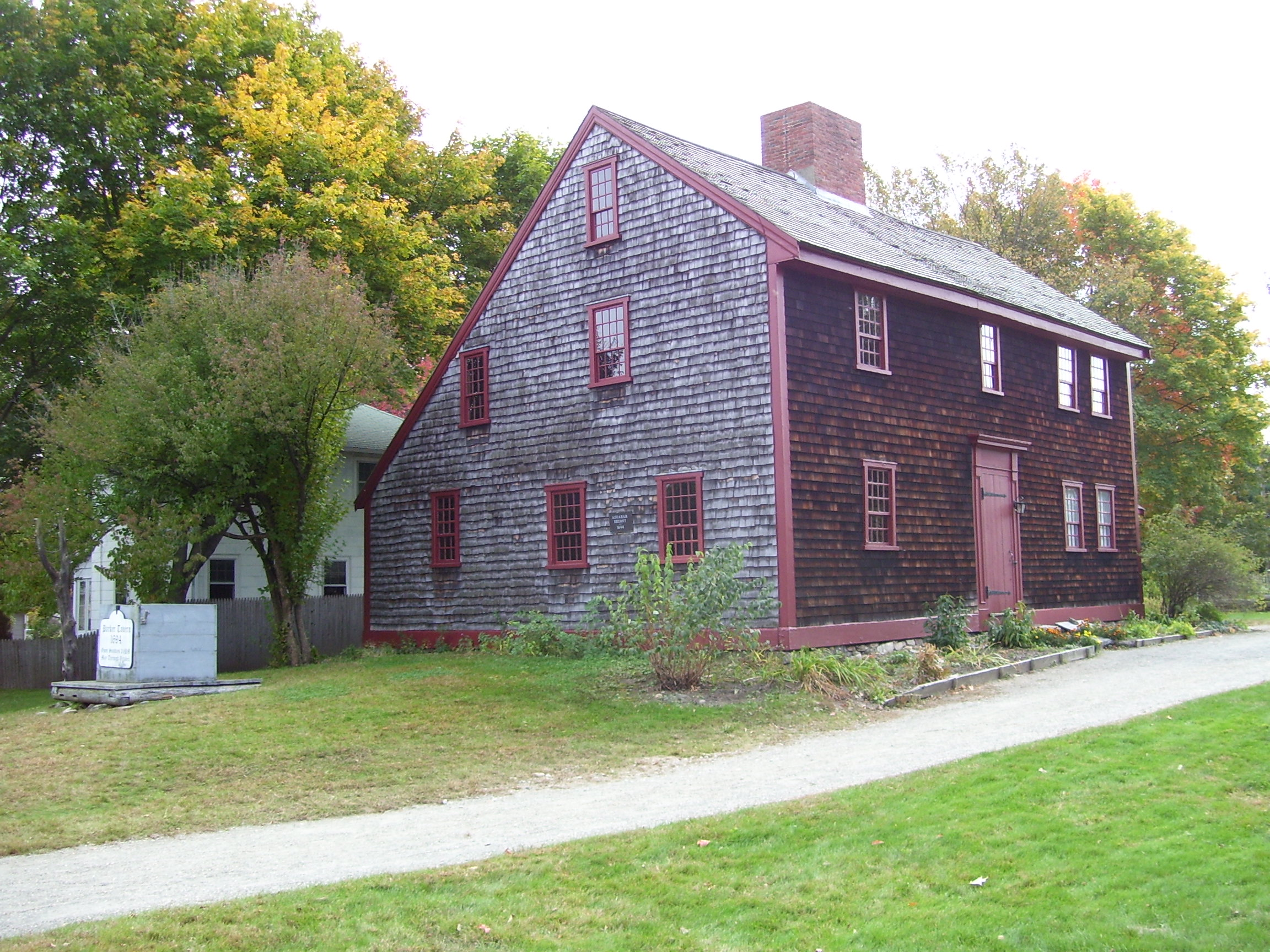
The Parker Tavern, built by Abraham Bryant in 1694, is the oldest surviving building in Reading. It was later owned and operated by Ephraim Parker, who was the great-grandson of Thomas Parker. The tavern is now a museum.

Parker was a selectman of Reading and was appointed a judicial commissioner. He owned 200 acres of land on the north side of the Ipswich River, but his homestead bordered the east side of the Wakefield (then part of Reading) Common, just northeast of today's Wakefield Town Hall. Reading split into three towns in the late 18th century, Wakefield (First Parish), North Reading (Second Parish) and Reading (Third Parish).

Parker's tombstone is in the cemetery just west of the First Parish Congregational Church in Wakefield. His actual grave is on the east side of the Common (which was larger at that time) on the east side of the church. By 1834, the old burial ground had gone uncared for, and virtually disappeared. In building a town house there in that year, some of the graves were broken into accidentally. The tombstones that were recoverable were relocated to their present positions west of the church, but the graves themselves were not.
