= Reading Public Schools =

School district in Massachusetts, United States

Reading Public Schools is the school district that manages the public schools in Reading, Massachusetts, USA.

Since July 2021, the superintendent is Dr. Thomas Milaschewski, who works under the direction of a six-person School Committee.

== Schools ==
=== High schools ===
- Reading Memorial High School

=== Middle schools ===
- Arthur W. Coolidge Middle School
- Walter S. Parker Middle School

=== Elementary schools ===
- Alice M. Barrows Elementary School - Barrows Elementary serves students grades K-5. Heather Leonard is the principal. The school is a Blue Ribbon School of Excellence.
- Birch Meadow Elementary School - Birch Meadow serves students grades K-5. Eric Sprung is the principal. The school was awarded the 2010 Lighthouse Award, and 2011 "Beacon of Light" by the Blue Ribbon School of Excellence Program. In the 2010-2011 school year, Birch Meadow made significant gains on the Massachusetts Comprehensive Assessment System, allowing the school to make AYP.
- Joshua Eaton Elementary School
- J. Warren Killam Elementary School
- Wood End Elementary School - There are 343 students in grades K-5 and 60 staff members. JoAnne King is the principal. The School was recognized in 2008 as a 'Beacon of Light' school by the Blue Ribbon School of Excellence Program. In spring 2008 the fifth grade students scored seventh in the state for the Massachusetts Comprehensive Assessment System Mathematics Test Massachusetts Comprehensive Assessment System.
