= Lake Quannapowitt =

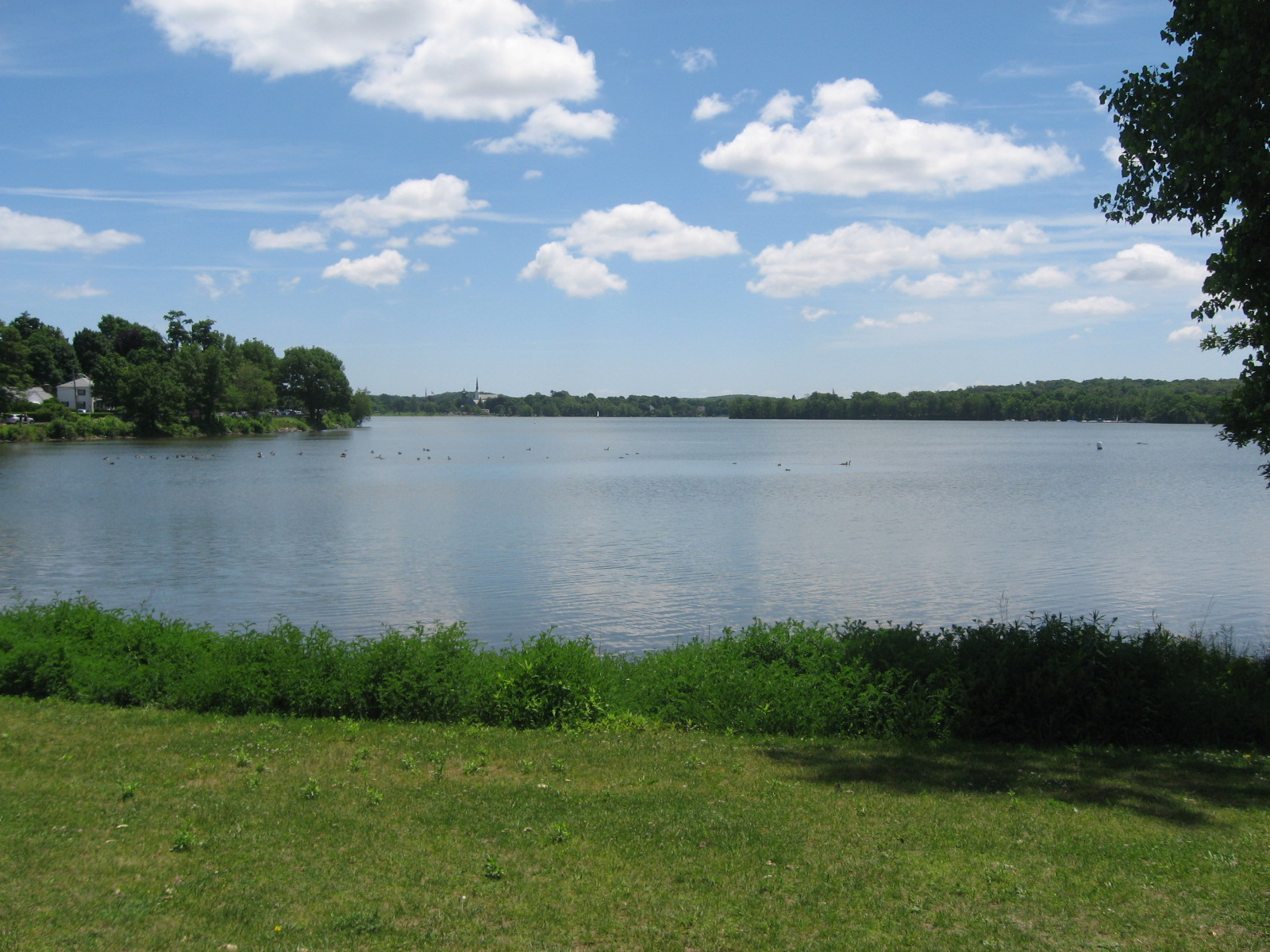

- Location within Massachusetts Location within the United States
- Location: Middlesex County, Massachusetts, U.S.
- Coordinates: 42°30′54″N 71°04′43″W
- Type: Reservoir
- Primary outflows: Saugus River
- Basin countries: United States
- Surface area: 0.397 sq mi (1.028 km^{2})
- Surface elevation: 79 ft (24 m)
- Dam: Lake Quannapowitt Dam
- Settlements: Wakefield

Lake Quannapowitt is a lake in Wakefield, Massachusetts. It is one of two large lakes in Wakefield, the other being the man-made Crystal Lake. The lake is named after Quonopohit, the Naumkeag Native American man who signed a deed to the town that would become Wakefield in 1686. The lake is located off Route 128 in Middlesex County. In 1991, the Friends of Lake Quannapowitt (FOLQ) was founded, which is a non-profit organization intended to protect and bring public awareness to the lake, as well as its nearby public areas. Large amounts of tar were found in the lake in 1999, a by-product of gas manufacturing from coal. The lake is emptied by the Saugus River.

As of 2016, two former beaches remain closed to swimming, due to the presence of arsenic, which was introduced into the lake in the early 1960s to handle aquatic weeds. Swimming in the lake is still discouraged as of April 2024, especially during algae blooms in the summer months.

The lake has active populations of warm-water species of fish.

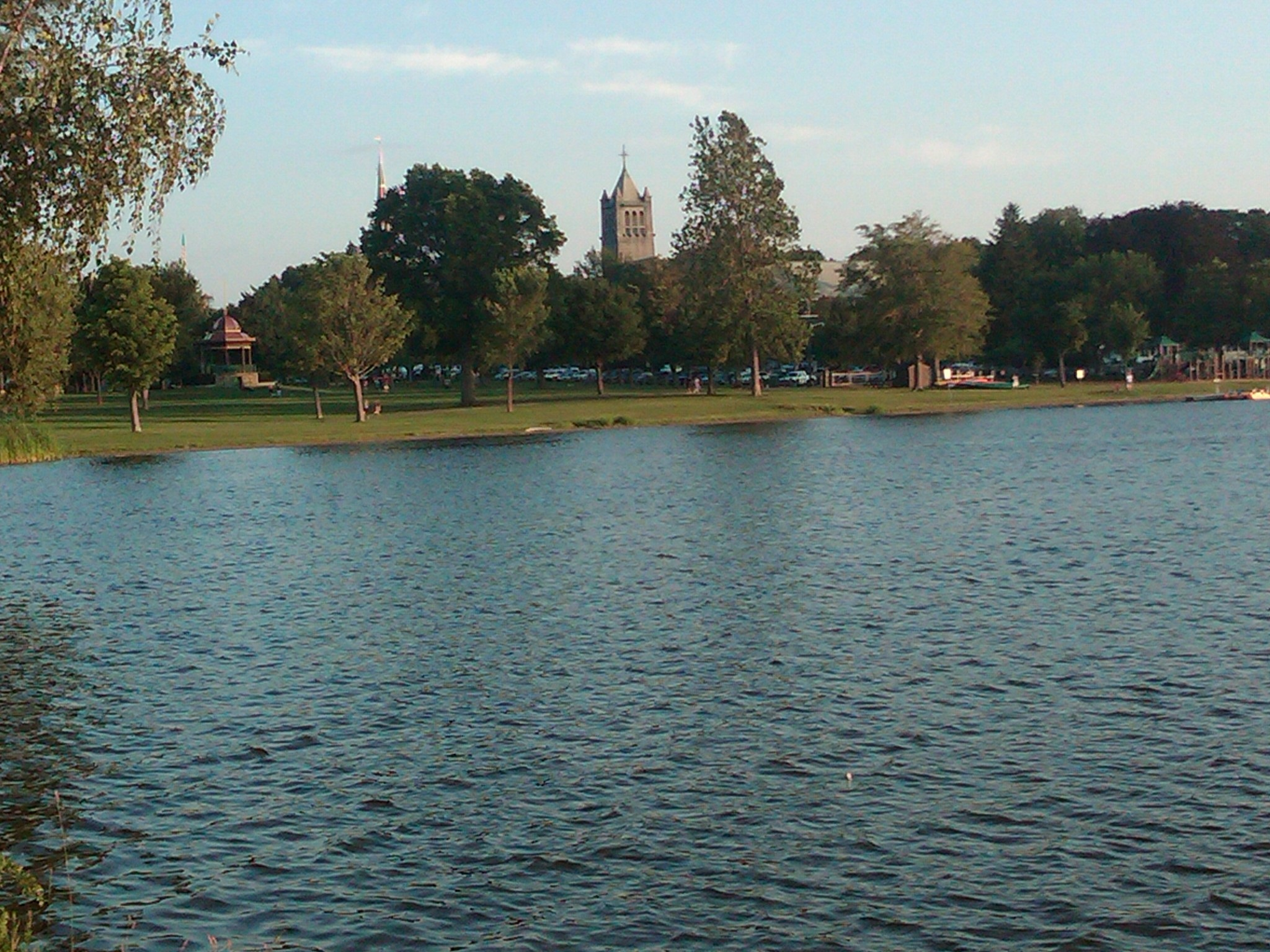
A view of Lake Quannapowitt from its southeast shores facing towards the town common on 07–18–2011.

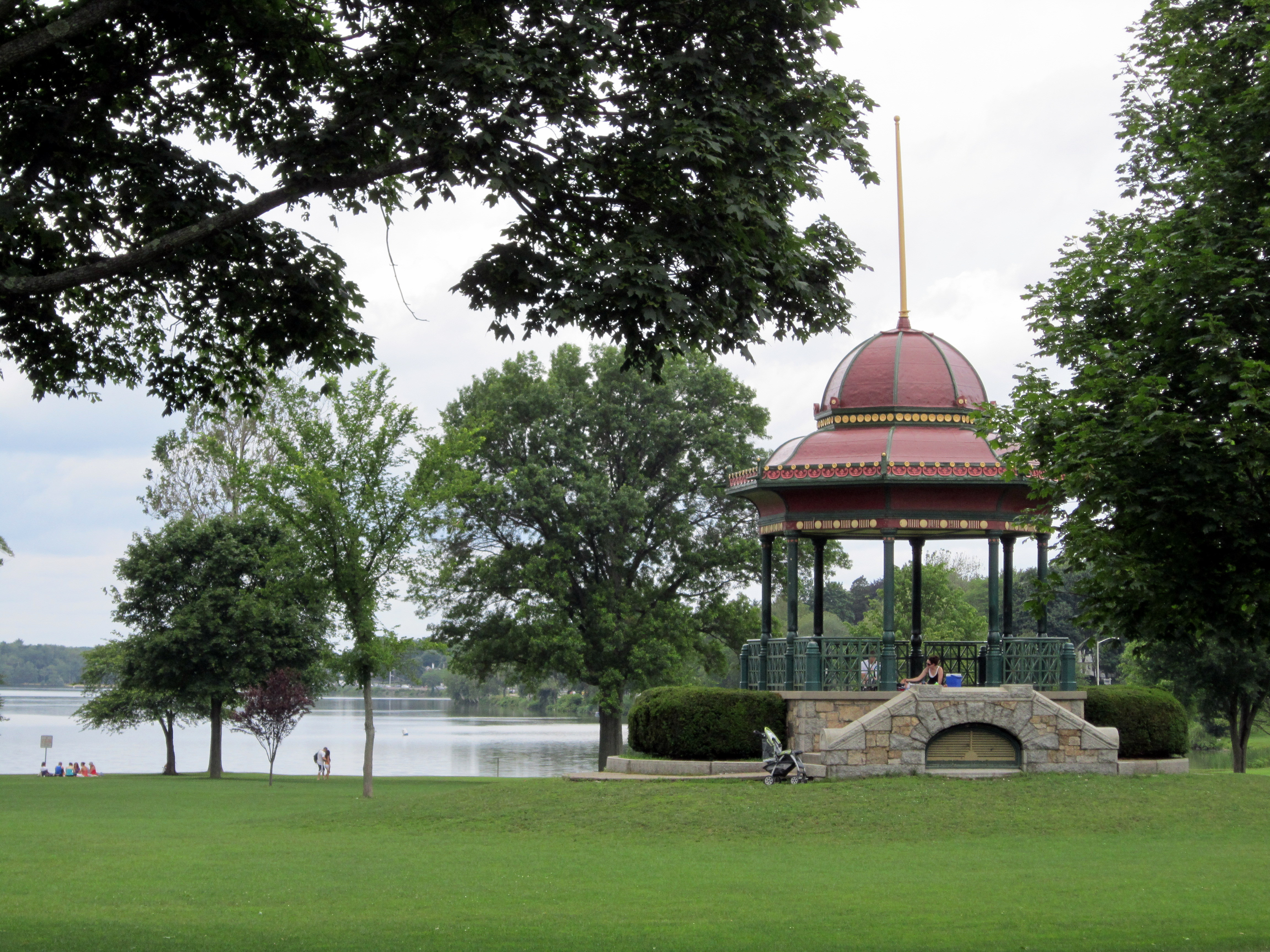
This wood and granite structure, colloquially known as "the Bandstand," was built in 1885 on the Lower Common in Wakefield and overlooks Lake Quannapowitt.

The town common of Wakefield abuts the southeastern shore of the lake. Located nearby the lake shore within the common is a gazebo locally called "the Bandstand."

== See also ==
- Wakefield, Massachusetts
