= House at 1 Woodcrest Drive =

Historic house in Massachusetts, United States

- U.S. National Register of Historic Places
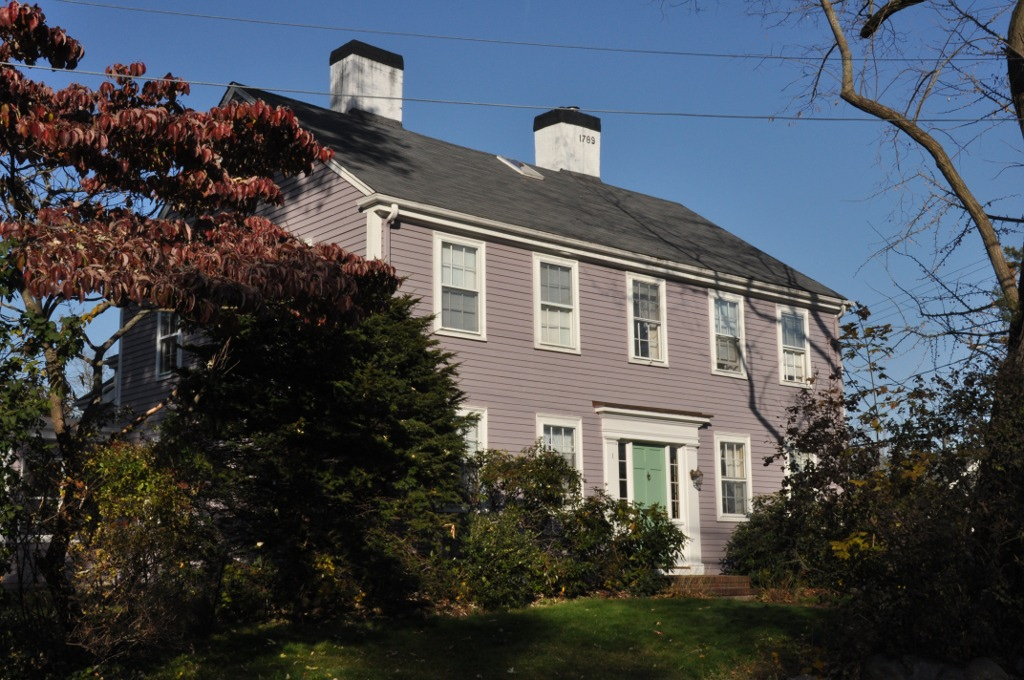

- Location within Massachusetts Location within the United States
- Location: 1 Woodcrest Dr., Wakefield, Massachusetts
- Coordinates: 42°31′11″N 71°3′51″W
- Built: 1789
- Architectural style: Federal
- MPS: Wakefield MRA
- NRHP reference No.: 89000673
- Added to NRHP: July 06, 1989

The House at 1 Woodcrest Drive in Wakefield, Massachusetts is a well-preserved late 18th-century Federal-style house. Built c. 1789, the 2 1/2-story timber-frame house has a typical five-bay front facade with center entry, and two interior chimneys. The doorway is framed by a surround with 3/4-length sidelight windows and flanking pilasters, topped by a modest entablature. It has two bake ovens, and its interior walls were originally insulated with corn cobs.

The house was listed on the National Register of Historic Places in 1989.

== See also ==
- National Register of Historic Places listings in Wakefield, Massachusetts
- National Register of Historic Places listings in Middlesex County, Massachusetts
