= Massachusetts State Armory =

- U.S. National Register of Historic Places
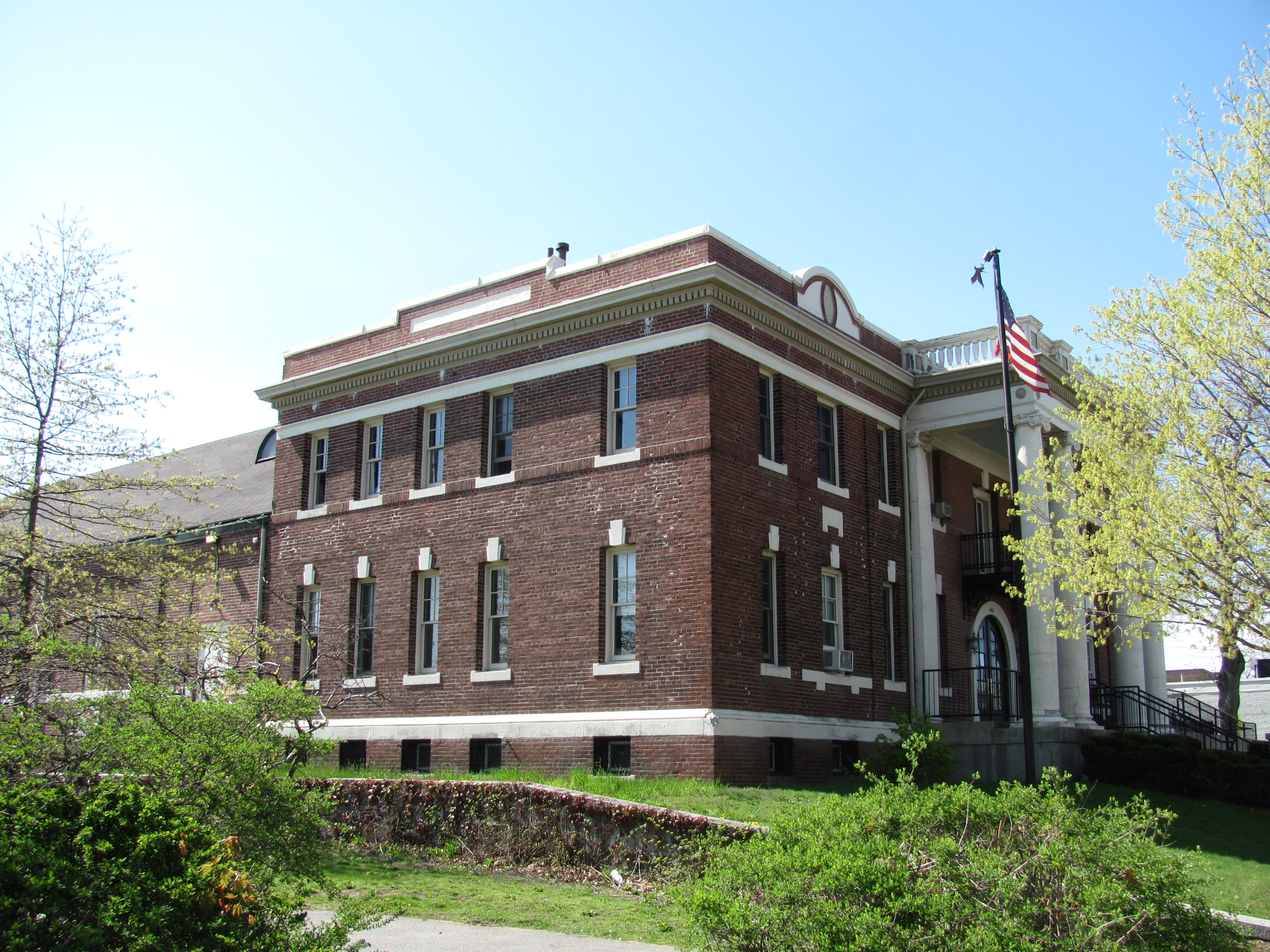
- Massachusetts State Armory in Wakefield

- Location within Massachusetts Location within the United States
- Location: 467 Main St., Wakefield, Massachusetts
- Coordinates: 42°30′5″N 71°4′13″W
- Built: 1913
- Architectural style: Classical Revival
- MPS: Wakefield MRA
- NRHP reference No.: 89000707
- Added to NRHP: July 6, 1989

The Massachusetts State Armory is a historic armory in Wakefield, Massachusetts. Built in 1913, it is a fine local example of Classical Revival architecture, and a symbol of the town's long military history. The building was listed on the National Register of Historic Places in 1989. It presently houses the Americal Civic Center, a local community center.

== Description and history ==
The armory is located on the west side of Main Street, at its southwest corner with Armory Street. It is a two-story Classical Revival brick building, whose front facade is dominated by a Classical portico with four columns extending the full height of the building. It has a stone water table and modillioned cornice. Windows have stone sills, and those on the first floor have stone keystones.

Wakefield's military history dates to the 17th century, when it was part of Reading. Its first militia company was raised in 1644, and had a continuous history extending to 1840. The Washington Rifle Greens were organized in 1812, and survived until 1850. In 1850 Dr. Solon O. Richardson, a prominent local businessman, organized the Richardson Light Guard, which served in the American Civil War. The town's first armory, a former town hall, was opened in 1873, with a new one built in 1894 on Main Street. That building burned down in 1911, and the state built the present building two years later. In 1975 the building was turned over to the town, and it was adapted for use as a community center.

== See also ==
- National Register of Historic Places listings in Wakefield, Massachusetts
- National Register of Historic Places listings in Middlesex County, Massachusetts
