= House at 54 Spring Street =

Historic house in Massachusetts, United States

- U.S. National Register of Historic Places
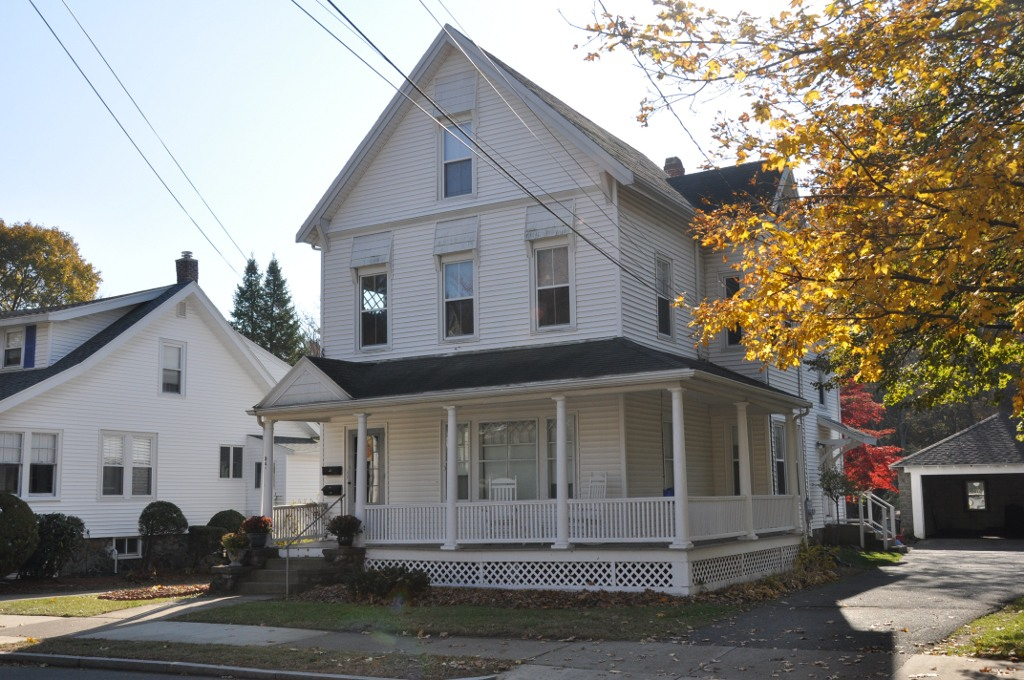

- Location within Massachusetts Location within the United States
- Location: 54 Spring St., Wakefield, Massachusetts
- Coordinates: 42°28′31″N 71°4′19″W
- Built: 1889
- Architectural style: Queen Anne
- MPS: Wakefield MRA
- NRHP reference No.: 89000703
- Added to NRHP: July 06, 1989

The House at 54 Spring Street in Wakefield, Massachusetts is a well-preserved Queen Anne Victorian house. The 2 1/2-story house was built c. 1889–90, and is most notable for its detailed shingle work. The house has an L shape, with a porch that wraps around the front and right side, into the crook of the L. The windows are topped by shed-roofed hoods with cut shingles, and there are bands of decorative shingle work filling the north side gables.

The house was listed on the National Register of Historic Places in 1989.

== See also ==
- National Register of Historic Places listings in Wakefield, Massachusetts
- National Register of Historic Places listings in Middlesex County, Massachusetts
