= House at 193 Vernon Street =

Historic house in Massachusetts, United States

- U.S. National Register of Historic Places
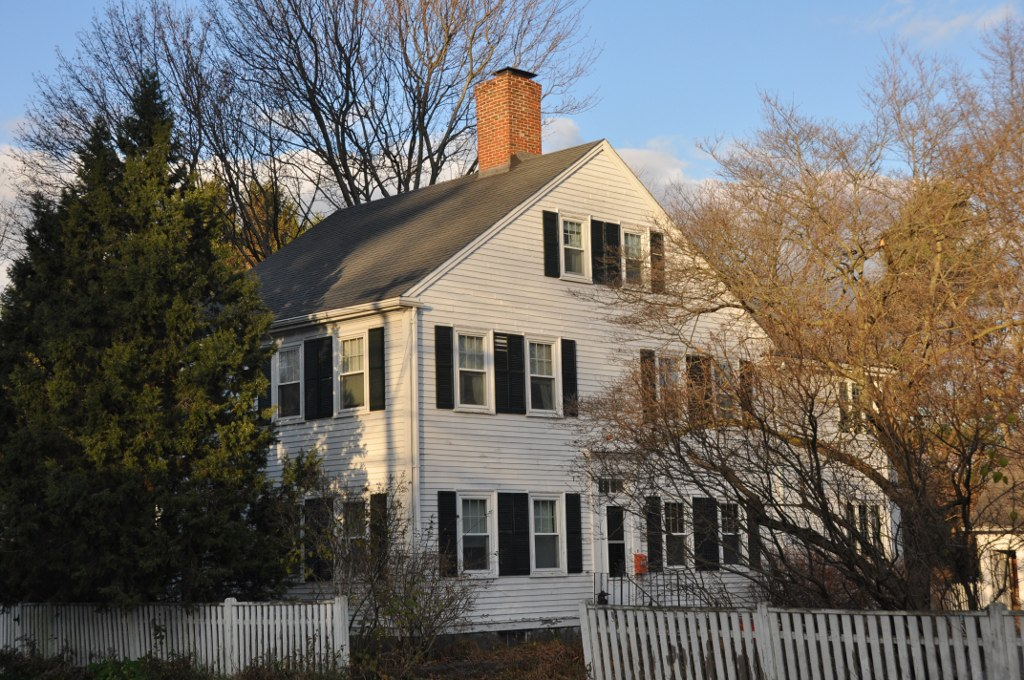

- Location within Massachusetts Location within the United States
- Location: 193 Vernon St., Wakefield, Massachusetts
- Coordinates: 42°30′41″N 71°4′1″W
- Area: less than one acre
- Built: 1840
- Architectural style: Federal
- MPS: Wakefield MRA
- NRHP reference No.: 89000674
- Added to NRHP: July 06, 1989

The House at 193 Vernon Street in Wakefield, Massachusetts is a late Federal-style house, built. c. 1840. The 2 1/2-story wood-frame house is a rare local example of a three-wide four-deep construction. It has a main entrance on the front facade that has sidelights and a pedimented entablature that were probably added later, and also has a side entrance with a Federal-style transom and sidelights. A late 19th-century barn stands behind the house, a reminder of the area's agricultural use.

The house was listed on the National Register of Historic Places in 1989.

== See also ==
- National Register of Historic Places listings in Wakefield, Massachusetts
- National Register of Historic Places listings in Middlesex County, Massachusetts
