= House at 28 Cordis Street =

Historic house in Massachusetts, United States

- U.S. National Register of Historic Places
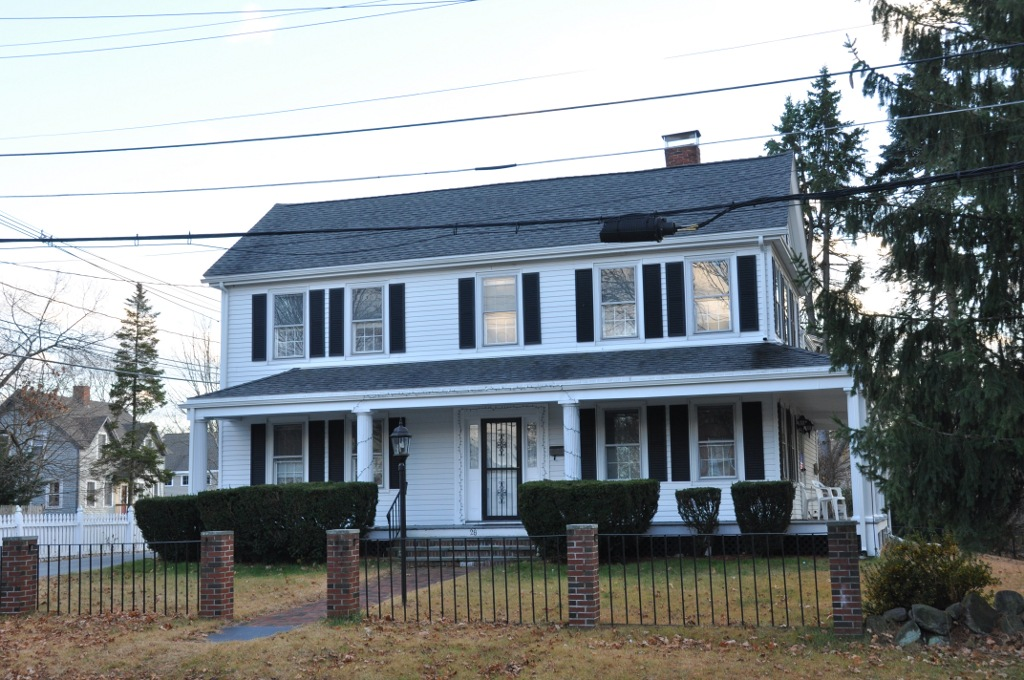

- Location within Massachusetts Location within the United States
- Location: 28 Cordis St., Wakefield, Massachusetts
- Coordinates: 42°30′55″N 71°4′19″W
- Built: 1840
- Architectural style: Greek Revival
- MPS: Wakefield MRA
- NRHP reference No.: 89000675
- Added to NRHP: July 06, 1989

28 Cordis Street is a historic house located in Wakefield, Massachusetts. It is significant as a well-preserved example of the Greek Revival style houses built during the early to mid 19th century.

== Description and history ==
It is a 2 1/2-story wood-frame structure, five bays wide, with a side gable roof and a hip-roofed wraparound porch. Its main entrance is flanked by sidelight windows. It was built c. 1835–45, and features rare original fluted Doric columns supporting its porch.

The house was added to the National Register of Historic Places on July 6, 1989, at which time it also featured a rare period fence; this feature has since been lost.

== See also ==
- National Register of Historic Places listings in Wakefield, Massachusetts
- National Register of Historic Places listings in Middlesex County, Massachusetts
