= House at 20 Morrison Road =

Historic house in Massachusetts, United States

- U.S. National Register of Historic Places
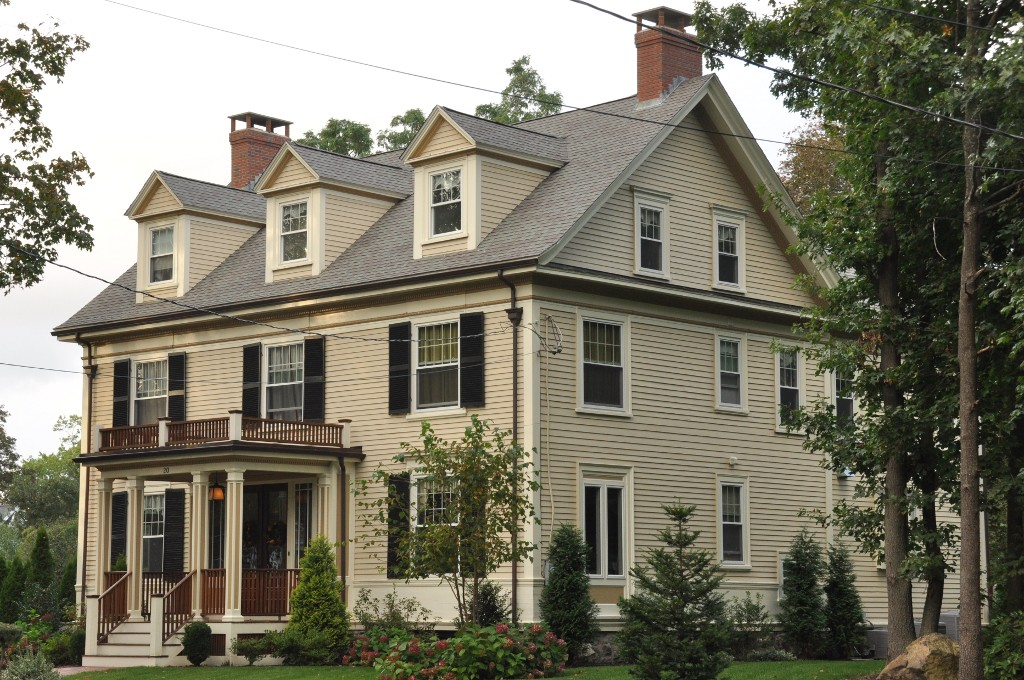

- Location within Massachusetts Location within the United States
- Location: 20 Morrison Rd., Wakefield, Massachusetts
- Coordinates: 42°30′5″N 71°5′25″W
- Built: 1890
- Architectural style: Colonial Revival
- MPS: Wakefield MRA
- NRHP reference No.: 89000724
- Added to NRHP: July 06, 1989

The House at 20 Morrison Road in Wakefield, Massachusetts is a well-preserved Colonial Revival house. The 2 1/2-story wood-frame house originally had a semicircular portico, a relative rarity in Wakefield. The porch has turned balusters, and the three roof dormers have pedimented gable ends. The house was built about 1890 on land originally part of the large estate of Dr. Charles Jordan, that was developed in the 1880s as Wakefield Park.

The house was listed on the National Register of Historic Places in 1989.

== See also ==
- National Register of Historic Places listings in Wakefield, Massachusetts
- National Register of Historic Places listings in Middlesex County, Massachusetts
