= House at 118 Greenwood Street =

Historic house in Massachusetts, United States

- U.S. National Register of Historic Places
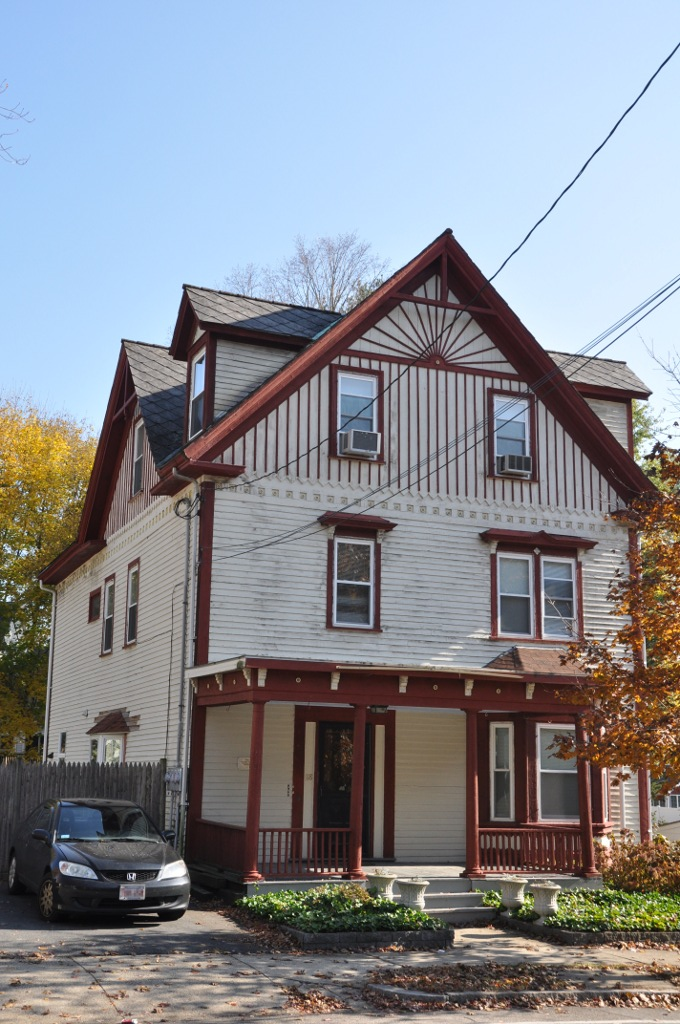

- Location within Massachusetts Location within the United States
- Location: 118 Greenwood St., Wakefield, Massachusetts
- Coordinates: 42°28′28″N 71°4′12″W
- Built: 1875
- Architectural style: Stick/Eastlake
- MPS: Wakefield MRA
- NRHP reference No.: 89000702
- Added to NRHP: July 06, 1989

The House at 118 Greenwood Street in Wakefield, Massachusetts is a rare well-preserved example of a Stick-style house. The 2 1/2-story house was built c. 1875, and features Stick-style bracing elements in its roof gables, hooded windows, with bracketing along those hoods and along the porch eave. Sawtooth edging to sections of board-and-batten siding give interest to the base of the gables, and on a projecting window bay. The house was built in an area that was farmland until the arrival of the railroad in the mid-19th century.

The house was listed on the National Register of Historic Places in 1989.

== See also ==
- National Register of Historic Places listings in Wakefield, Massachusetts
- National Register of Historic Places listings in Middlesex County, Massachusetts
