= House at 9 White Avenue =

Historic house in Massachusetts, United States

- U.S. National Register of Historic Places
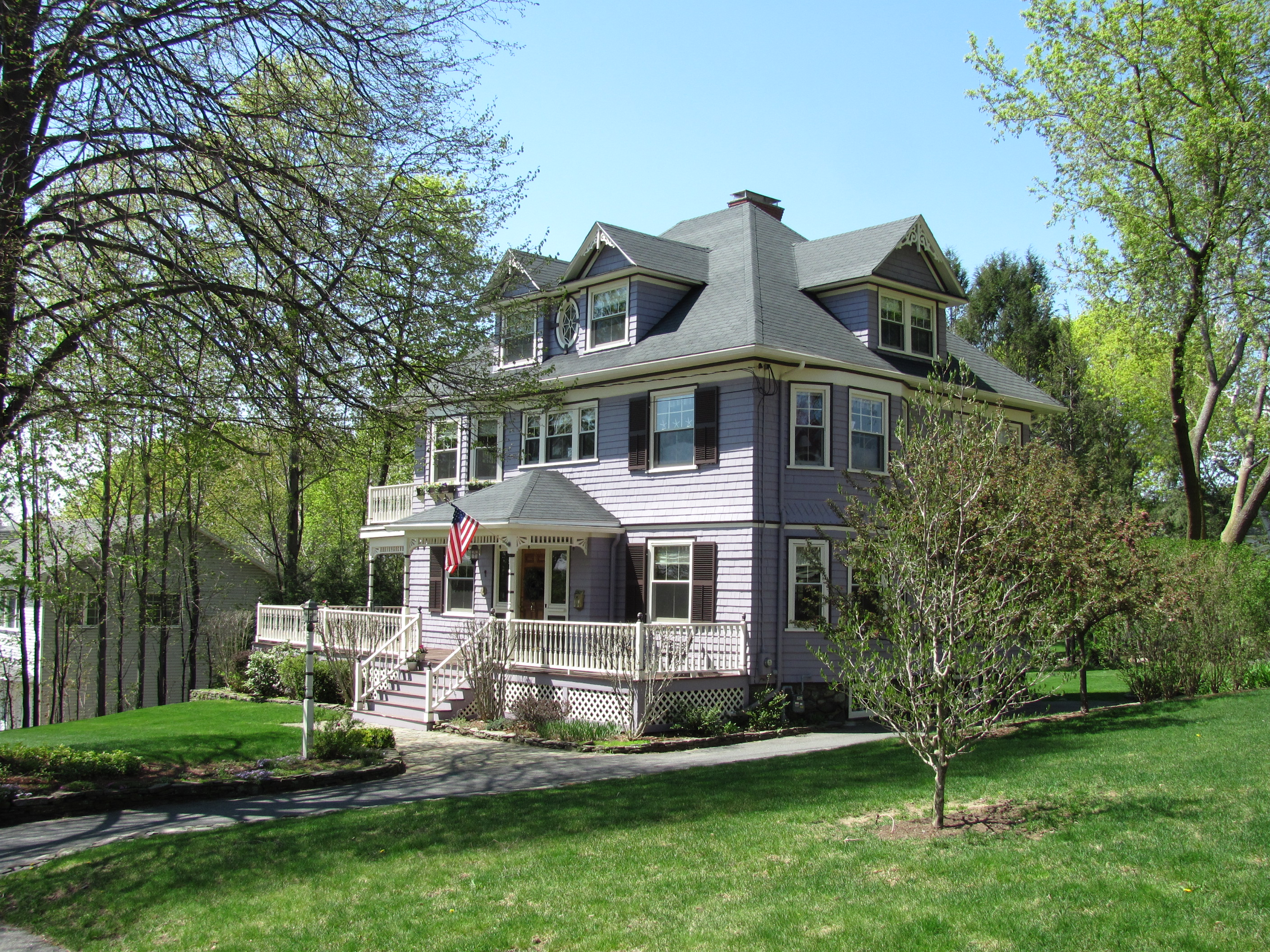
- House at 9 White Avenue

- Location within Massachusetts Location within the United States
- Location: 9 White Ave., Wakefield, Massachusetts
- Coordinates: 42°30′42″N 71°4′17″W
- Area: less than one acre
- Built: 1903
- Architectural style: Colonial Revival, Georgian Revival
- MPS: Wakefield MRA
- NRHP reference No.: 89000677
- Added to NRHP: July 06, 1989

The House at 9 White Avenue in Wakefield, Massachusetts is a well-preserved transitional Queen Anne/Colonial Revival house. Built about 1903, it was listed on the National Register of Historic Places in 1989.

== Description and history ==
White Avenue is located northeast of downtown Wakefield, and is a short street in a residential area just east of Lake Quannapowitt. This house stands on the north side of the street, facing south on a lot that slopes west toward the lake. It is a 2 1/2-story wood-frame structure, with a hip roof, with two gable-roof and clapboarded exterior. Its roof has dormers bracketing an oriel window in front, and a normal gabled dormer to the side; these gables are decorated with jigsawn Queen Anne woodwork. The house is three bays wide, with a center entrance sheltered by a porch supported by paired columns, with jigsawn valances. The porch extends to an open veranda to either side.

White Avenue was originally part of a larger property owned by John Aborn, a shoemaker who lived in a house west of this one on Main Street. Aborn and his father-in-law John White owned a successful shoe factory. Aborn's heirs laid out White Avenue and adjacent Aborn Street in 1857, and the area was developed in the 1860s and 1870s as a residential area for local middle-class businessmen and tradesmen. This house was built about 1903, and its first long-term owner was Edward Gleason, who moved here from Aborn Street. Gleason was a prominent local landscape and portrait photographer, who also kept an office in Boston. Gleason is credited with most of the photographs depicted in the 1893 book Wakefield; its Representative Business Men and Points of Interest.

== See also ==
- National Register of Historic Places listings in Wakefield, Massachusetts
- National Register of Historic Places listings in Middlesex County, Massachusetts
