= House at 190 Main Street =

Historic house in Massachusetts, United States

- U.S. National Register of Historic Places
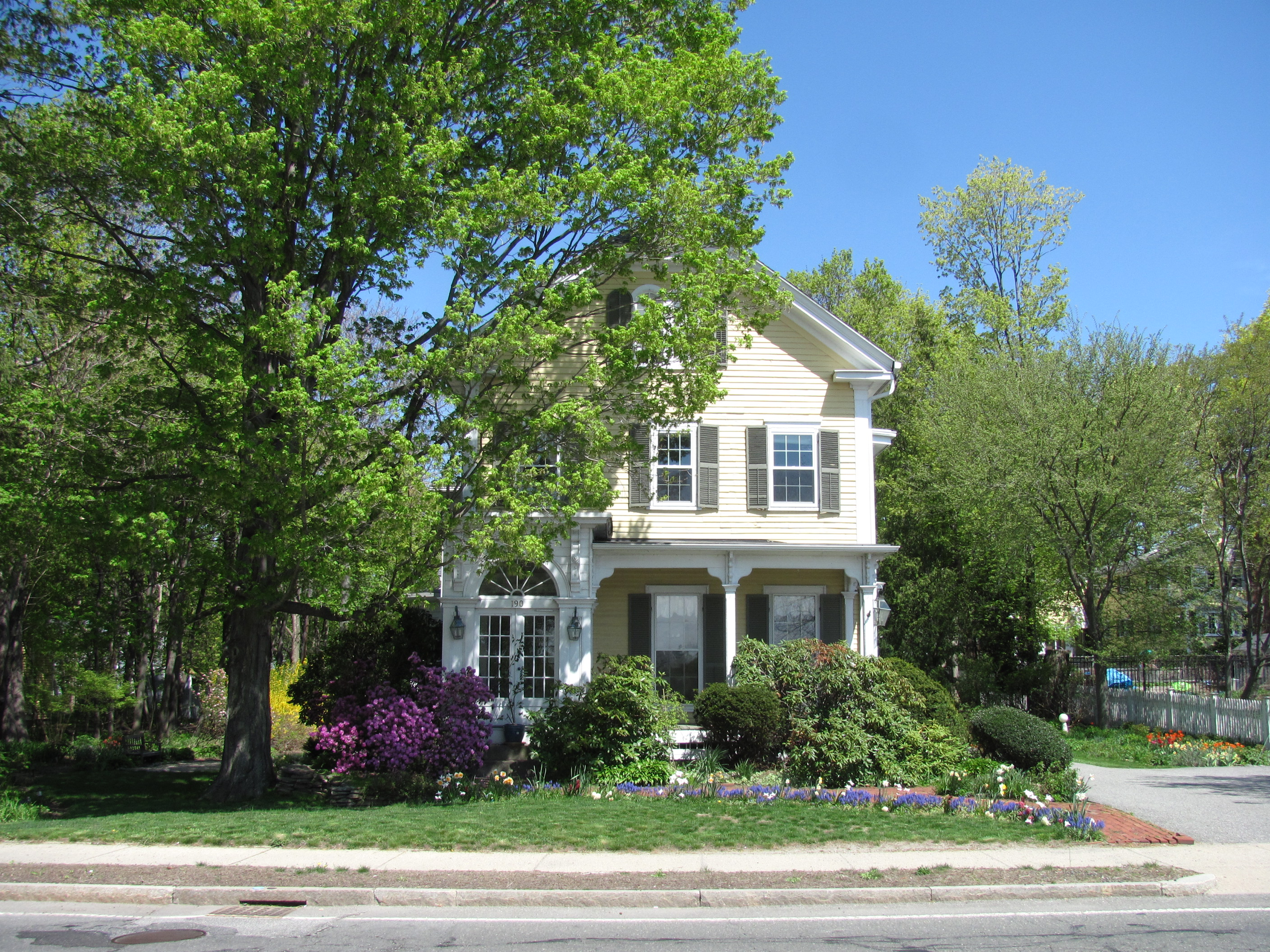
- House at 190 Main Street

- Location within Massachusetts Location within the United States
- Location: 190 Main St., Wakefield, Massachusetts
- Coordinates: 42°30′49″N 71°4′27″W
- Architectural style: Italianate
- MPS: Wakefield MRA
- NRHP reference No.: 89000666
- Added to NRHP: July 06, 1989

The House at 190 Main Street, also known as the William F. Young House, is a historic house at 190 Main Street in Wakefield, Massachusetts. The exact construction date of the 2 1/2-story wood-frame house is uncertain: it follows a traditional three-bay side-hall plan, but was also extensively remodeled sometime before 1870 with Italianate styling, probably by William F. Young, a commuter who worked at a grocery firm in Boston. It has a round-arch window in the front gable end, and its porch features narrow chamfered posts topped by a flat arched frieze. The main entry portico is closed in, and it and the porch feature decorative brackets.

The house was listed on the National Register of Historic Places in 1989.

== See also ==
- National Register of Historic Places listings in Wakefield, Massachusetts
- National Register of Historic Places listings in Middlesex County, Massachusetts
