= Woodward Homestead =

Historic house in Massachusetts, United States

- U.S. National Register of Historic Places
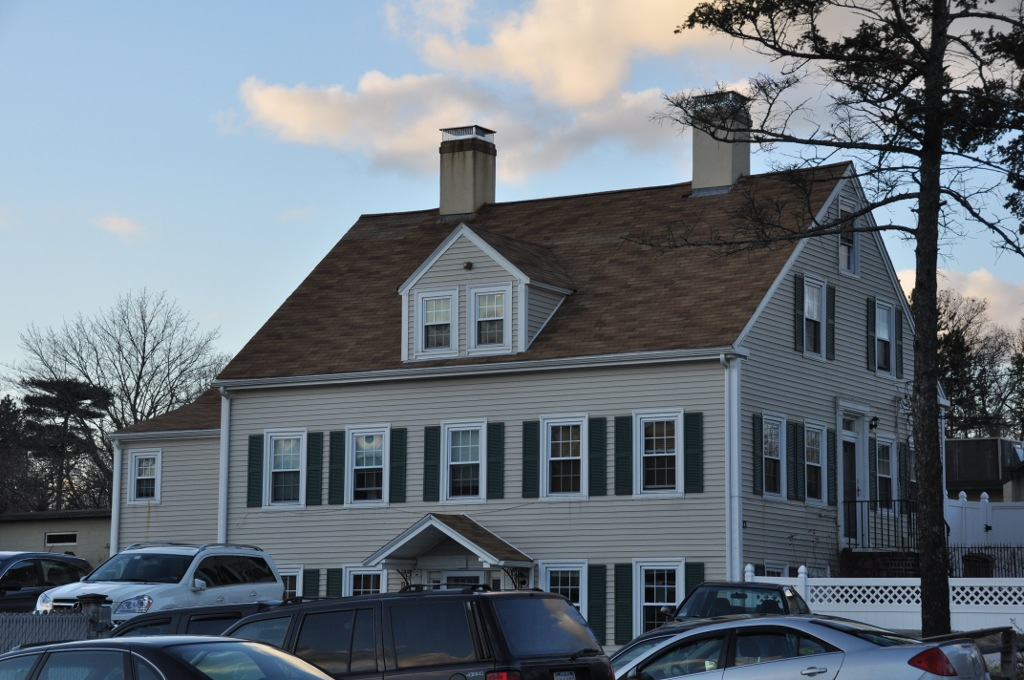

- Location within Massachusetts Location within the United States
- Location: 17 Main St., Wakefield, Massachusetts
- Coordinates: 42°31′27″N 71°4′46″W
- Architectural style: Federal
- MPS: Wakefield MRA
- NRHP reference No.: 89000747
- Added to NRHP: July 6, 1989

The Woodward Homestead is a historic house at 17 Main Street in Wakefield, Massachusetts, United States. It is an unusual style wood-frame house, with an older portion (the north side) that is 1.5 stories and was probably built sometime before 1765. It was remodeled later in the 19th century in the Federal style, and in the 1830s the southern portion of the house was added, with Greek Revival style (although the northern section retained its Federal character). The first known occupant was John Woodward in 1765; he was from a family that arrived in the area late in the 17th century.

The house was listed on the National Register of Historic Places in 1989.

== See also ==
- National Register of Historic Places listings in Wakefield, Massachusetts
- National Register of Historic Places listings in Middlesex County, Massachusetts
