= House at 38 Salem Street =

Historic house in Massachusetts, United States

- U.S. National Register of Historic Places
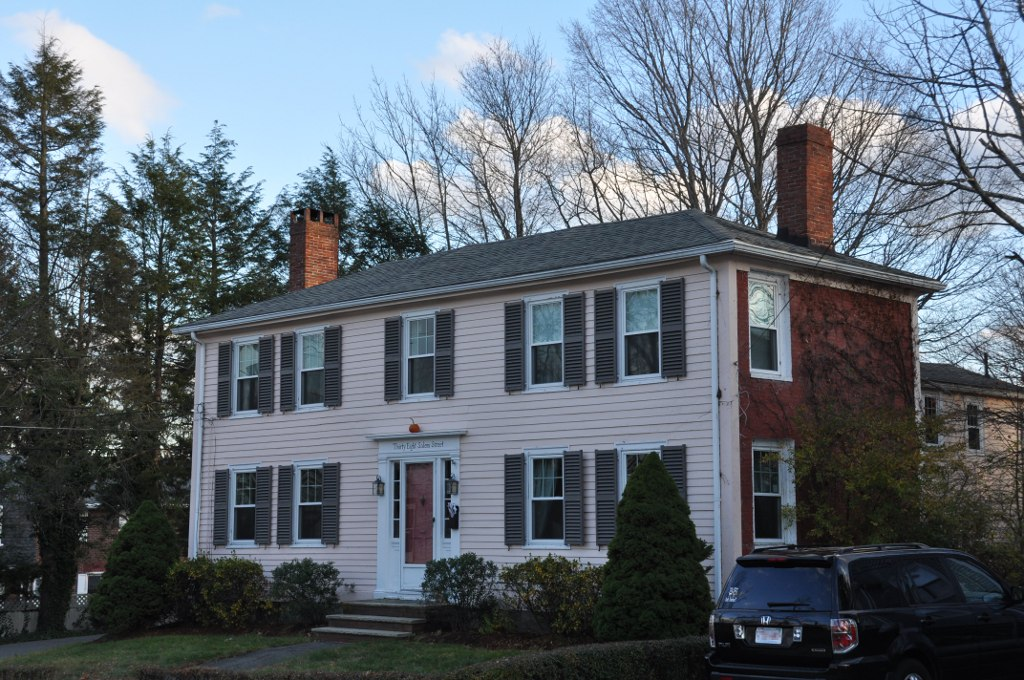

- Location within Massachusetts Location within the United States
- Location: 38 Salem St., Wakefield, Massachusetts
- Coordinates: 42°30′32″N 71°4′6″W
- Built: 1835
- Architectural style: Federal
- MPS: Wakefield MRA
- NRHP reference No.: 89000687
- Added to NRHP: July 06, 1989

The House at 38 Salem Street in Wakefield, Massachusetts is a late Federal period house. The 2 1/2-story wood-frame house is believed to have been built c. 1810, and has locally unusual features, including brick side walls and a hipped roof. Its twin slender chimneys are indicative of late Federal styling. The front entry is topped by an entablatured with a compressed frieze, and is flanked by three-quarter sidelight windows.

The house was listed on the National Register of Historic Places in 1989.

== See also ==
- National Register of Historic Places listings in Wakefield, Massachusetts
- National Register of Historic Places listings in Middlesex County, Massachusetts
