= Lynnwood (Wakefield, Massachusetts) =

Historic house in Massachusetts, United States

- U.S. National Register of Historic Places
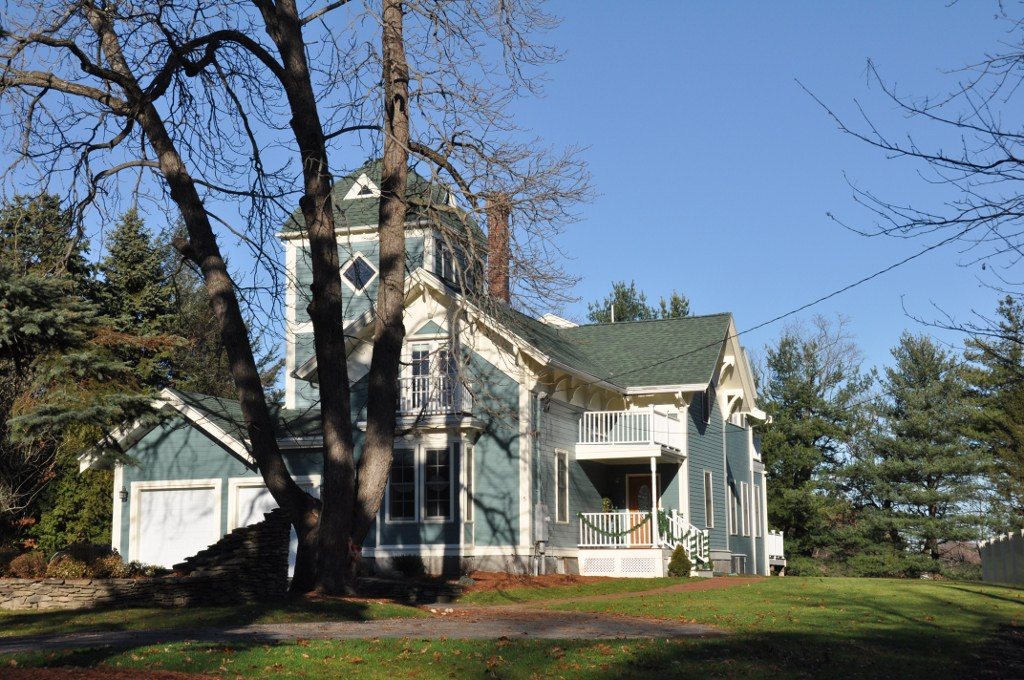

- Location within Massachusetts Location within the United States
- Location: 5 Linden Ave., Wakefield, Massachusetts
- Coordinates: 42°29′25″N 71°4′20″W
- Built: 1858
- Architectural style: Stick/Eastlake
- MPS: Wakefield MRA
- NRHP reference No.: 89000705
- Added to NRHP: July 06, 1989

Lynnwood is a historic house at 5 Linden Avenue in Wakefield, Massachusetts. Built c. 1858, it is one of the town's finest examples of Stick style architecture. It is a 1 1/2-story wood-frame structure with an L-shaped cross-gable configuration; its features include deep eaves supported by arched brackets, and a 3 1/2-story tower topped by a hip roof with triangular dormer windows. Its eaves have brackets with pendants, and its windows have surrounds with drip molding.

The house was listed on the National Register of Historic Places in 1989.

== See also ==
- National Register of Historic Places listings in Wakefield, Massachusetts
- National Register of Historic Places listings in Middlesex County, Massachusetts
