= William Stimpson House =

Historic house in Massachusetts, United States

- U.S. National Register of Historic Places
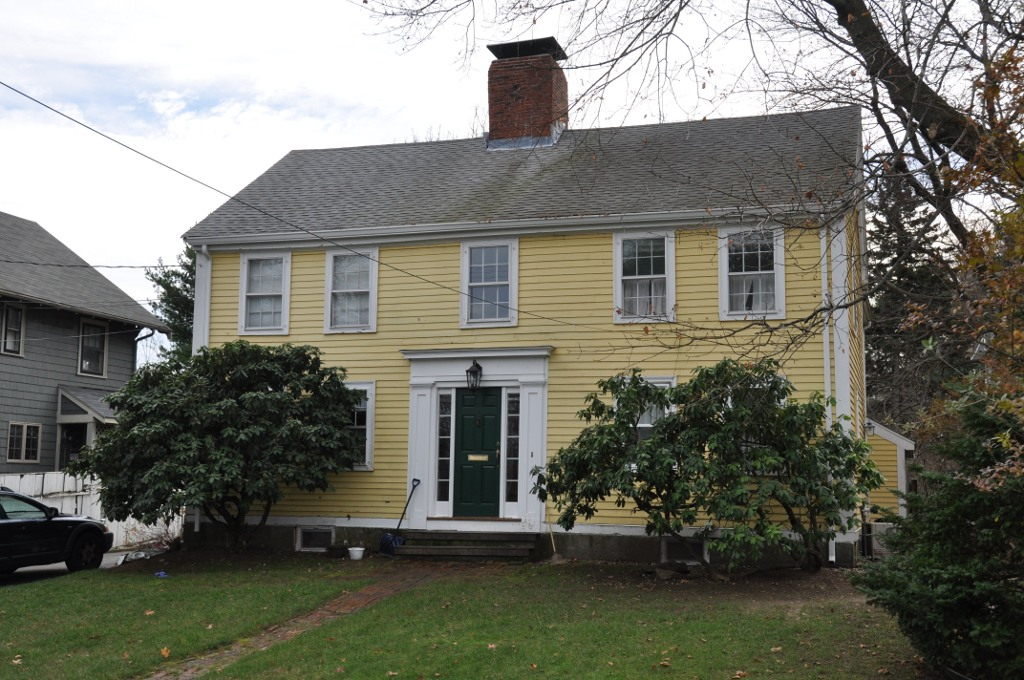

- Location within Massachusetts Location within the United States
- Location: 22 Prospect St., Wakefield, Massachusetts
- Coordinates: 42°30′20″N 71°4′52″W
- Architectural style: Federal
- MPS: Wakefield MRA
- NRHP reference No.: 89000741
- Added to NRHP: July 06, 1989

The William Stimpson House is a historic house at 22 Prospect Street in Wakefield, Massachusetts. The 2 1/2-story timber-frame house was built sometime before 1795, probably by William Stimpson, son of the local doctor. It has conservative Federal styling, most notably due to its central chimney rather than the more typical twin chimneys of the period. The building's internal layout and two kitchen fireplaces suggest that it was built as a two-family residence.

The house was listed on the National Register of Historic Places in 1989.

== See also ==
- National Register of Historic Places listings in Wakefield, Massachusetts
- National Register of Historic Places listings in Middlesex County, Massachusetts
