= National Register of Historic Places listings in Wakefield, Massachusetts =

This is a list of properties and historic districts in Wakefield, Massachusetts, that are listed on the National Register of Historic Places.

The locations of National Register properties and districts (at least for all showing latitude and longitude coordinates below) may be seen in an online map by clicking on "Map of all coordinates".

This National Park Service list is complete through NPS recent listings posted May 1, 2026.

== Current listings ==
	Name on the Register	Image	Date listed	Location	City or town	Description
1	Beacon Street Tomb	Beacon Street Tomb	July 6, 1989 (#89000714)	Beacon St. 42°30′35″N 71°04′50″W		
2	Beebe Homestead	Beebe Homestead	July 6, 1989 (#89000667)	142 Main St. 42°31′01″N 71°04′28″W		
3	E. Boardman House	E. Boardman House	July 6, 1989 (#89000686)	34 Salem St. 42°30′31″N 71°04′07″W		
4	Elizabeth Boit House	Elizabeth Boit House	July 6, 1989 (#89000720)	127 Chestnut St. 42°30′11″N 71°05′11″W		
5	Breakheart Reservation Parkways-Metropolitan Park System of Greater Boston	Breakheart Reservation Parkways-Metropolitan Park System of Greater Boston	August 11, 2003 (#03000748)	Forest St., Pine Tops, Elm and Hemlock Rds. 42°29′15″N 71°02′05″W		Extends into Saugus in Essex County.
6	Buildings at 35–37 Richardson Avenue	Buildings at 35–37 Richardson Avenue	July 6, 1989 (#89000710)	35–37 Richardson Ave. 42°30′08″N 71°04′24″W		
7	Building at 38–48 Richardson Avenue	Building at 38–48 Richardson Avenue	July 6, 1989 (#89000709)	38–48 Richardson Ave. 42°30′05″N 71°04′30″W		
8	Center Depot	Center Depot	July 6, 1989 (#89000693)	57 Water St. 42°30′09″N 71°04′05″W		
9	Church-Lafayette Streets Historic District	Church-Lafayette Streets Historic District	July 6, 1989 (#89000757)	Roughly Church St. from Lafayette St. to North Ave. 42°30′20″N 71°04′38″W		
10	Common District	Common District	March 2, 1990 (#89000754)	Roughly bounded by Lake Quannapowitt, Main St., Common St., Church St., and Lake Ave. 42°30′23″N 71°04′23″W		
11	Jonas Cowdry House	Jonas Cowdry House	July 6, 1989 (#89000739)	61 Prospect St. 42°30′18″N 71°05′08″W		
12	Nathaniel Cowdry House	Nathaniel Cowdry House	July 6, 1989 (#89000738)	71 Prospect St. 42°30′17″N 71°05′10″W		
13	Emerson-Franklin Poole House	Emerson-Franklin Poole House	July 6, 1989 (#89000685)	23 Salem St. 42°30′31″N 71°04′10″W		
14	Flanley's Block	Flanley's Block	July 6, 1989 (#89000729)	349–353 Main St. 42°30′16″N 71°04′19″W		
15	Captain Goodwin-James Eustis House	Captain Goodwin-James Eustis House	March 2, 1990 (#89000744)	1 Elm St. 42°30′21″N 71°04′52″W		Misspelled "Custis" in the National Register listing.
16	Samuel Gould House	Samuel Gould House	July 6, 1989 (#89000704)	48 Meriam St. 42°29′10″N 71°04′12″W		
17	Green House	Green House	March 9, 1990 (#90000185)	391 Vernon St. 42°31′23″N 71°03′53″W		Duplicate listing for Capt. William Green House.
18	Capt. William Green House	Capt. William Green House	July 6, 1989 (#89000672)	391 Vernon St.		Duplicate listing for Green House.
19	Deacon Daniel Green House	Deacon Daniel Green House	July 6, 1989 (#89000706)	747 Main St. 42°29′29″N 71°04′10″W		
20	Greenwood Union Church	Greenwood Union Church	July 6, 1989 (#89000697)	Main and Oak; 42°28′57″N 71°04′00″W		
21	House at 1 Morrison Avenue	House at 1 Morrison Avenue	July 6, 1989 (#89000722)	1 Morrison Ave. 42°30′03″N 71°05′18″W		
22	House at 1 Woodcrest Drive	House at 1 Woodcrest Drive	July 6, 1989 (#89000673)	1 Woodcrest Dr. 42°31′11″N 71°03′51″W		
23	House at 2 Nichols Street	House at 2 Nichols Street	July 6, 1989 (#89000740)	2 Nichols St. 42°30′21″N 71°05′02″W		
24	House at 5 Bennett Street	House at 5 Bennett Street	July 6, 1989 (#89000698)	5 Bennett St. 42°29′59″N 71°04′10″W		
25	House at 6 Adams Street	House at 6 Adams Street	July 6, 1989 (#89000721)	6 Adams St. 42°30′07″N 71°05′13″W		
26	House at 7 Salem Street	House at 7 Salem Street	July 6, 1989 (#89000683)	7 Salem St. 42°30′30″N 71°04′14″W		
27	House at 8 Park Street	House at 8 Park Street	July 6, 1989 (#89000689)	8 Park St. 42°30′23″N 71°04′15″W		
28	House at 9 White Avenue	House at 9 White Avenue	July 6, 1989 (#89000677)	9 White Ave. 42°30′42″N 71°04′17″W		
29	House at 11 Wave Avenue	House at 11 Wave Avenue	July 6, 1989 (#89000678)	11 Wave Ave. 42°30′40″N 71°04′15″W		
30	House at 12 West Water Street	House at 12 West Water Street	July 6, 1989 (#89000708)	12 W. Water St. 42°30′07″N 71°04′17″W		
31	House at 13 Sheffield Road	House at 13 Sheffield Road	July 6, 1989 (#89000734)	13 Sheffield Rd. 42°30′12″N 71°05′22″W		
32	House at 15 Chestnut Street	House at 15 Chestnut Street	July 6, 1989 (#89000726)	15 Chestnut St. 42°30′13″N 71°04′26″W		
33	House at 15 Lawrence Avenue	House at 15 Lawrence Avenue	July 6, 1989 (#89000682)	15 Lawrence Ave. 42°30′37″N 71°04′14″W		
34	House at 15 Wave Avenue	House at 15 Wave Avenue	July 6, 1989 (#89000679)	15 Wave Ave. 42°30′40″N 71°04′14″W		
35	House at 18 Park Street	House at 18 Park Street	July 6, 1989 (#89000690)	18 Park St. 42°30′23″N 71°04′13″W		
36	House at 18A and 20 Aborn Street	House at 18A and 20 Aborn Street	July 6, 1989 (#89000676)	18A and 20 Aborn St. 42°30′45″N 71°04′20″W		
37	House at 19–21 Salem Street	House at 19–21 Salem Street	July 6, 1989 (#89000684)	19–21 Salem St. 42°30′31″N 71°04′11″W		
38	House at 20 Hancock Road	House at 20 Hancock Road	July 6, 1989 (#89000671)	20 Hancock Rd. 42°31′05″N 71°04′25″W		
39	House at 20 Lawrence Street	House at 20 Lawrence Street	July 6, 1989 (#89000680)	20 Lawrence St. 42°30′36″N 71°04′11″W		
40	House at 20 Morrison Road	House at 20 Morrison Road	July 6, 1989 (#89000724)	20 Morrison Rd. 42°30′05″N 71°05′25″W		
41	House at 21 Chestnut Street	House at 21 Chestnut Street	July 6, 1989 (#89000727)	21 Chestnut St. 42°30′12″N 71°04′29″W		
42	House at 22 Parker Road	House at 22 Parker Road	July 6, 1989 (#89000735)	22 Parker Rd. 42°30′17″N 71°05′16″W		
43	House at 23 Avon Street	House at 23 Avon Street	July 6, 1989 (#89000730)	23 Avon St. 42°30′15″N 71°04′26″W		
44	House at 23 Lawrence Street	House at 23 Lawrence Street	July 6, 1989 (#89000681)	23 Lawrence St. 42°30′40″N 71°04′10″W		
45	House at 25 Avon Street	House at 25 Avon Street	July 6, 1989 (#89000731)	25 Avon St. 42°30′15″N 71°04′29″W		
46	House at 26 Francis Avenue	House at 26 Francis Avenue	July 6, 1989 (#89000701)	26 Francis Ave. 42°29′00″N 71°03′46″W		
47	House at 28 Cordis Street	House at 28 Cordis Street	July 6, 1989 (#89000675)	28 Cordis St. 42°30′55″N 71°04′19″W		
48	House at 28 Wiley Street	House at 28 Wiley Street	July 6, 1989 (#89000695)	28 Wiley St. 42°29′50″N 71°02′50″W		
49	House at 30 Sheffield Road	House at 30 Sheffield Road	July 6, 1989 (#89000733)	30 Sheffield Rd. 42°30′13″N 71°05′24″W		
50	House at 32 Morrison Road	House at 32 Morrison Road	July 6, 1989 (#89000723)	32 Morrison Rd. 42°30′01″N 71°05′20″W		
51	House at 38 Salem Street	House at 38 Salem Street	July 6, 1989 (#89000687)	38 Salem St. 42°30′32″N 71°04′06″W		
52	House at 39 Converse Street	House at 39 Converse Street	July 6, 1989 (#89000718)	39 Converse St. 42°29′59″N 71°05′09″W		
53	House at 40 Crescent Street	House at 40 Crescent Street	July 6, 1989 (#89000691)	40 Crescent St. 42°30′13″N 71°04′08″W		
54	House at 42 Hopkins Street	House at 42 Hopkins Street	July 6, 1989 (#89000732)	42 Hopkins St. 42°30′13″N 71°05′48″W		
55	House at 52 Oak Street	House at 52 Oak Street	July 6, 1989 (#89000700)	52 Oak St. 42°29′09″N 71°03′46″W		
56	House at 54 Spring Street	House at 54 Spring Street	July 6, 1989 (#89000703)	54 Spring St. 42°28′31″N 71°04′19″W		
57	House at 88 Prospect Street	House at 88 Prospect Street	July 6, 1989 (#89000737)	88 Prospect St. 42°30′14″N 71°05′10″W		
58	House at 90 Prospect Street	House at 90 Prospect Street	July 6, 1989 (#89000736)	90 Prospect St. 42°30′13″N 71°05′11″W		
59	House at 95 Chestnut Street	House at 95 Chestnut Street	July 6, 1989 (#89000725)	95 Chestnut St. 42°30′06″N 71°05′00″W		
60	House at 113 Salem Street	House at 113 Salem Street	July 6, 1989 (#89000688)	113 Salem St. 42°30′32″N 71°04′04″W		
61	House at 118 Greenwood Street	House at 118 Greenwood Street	July 6, 1989 (#89000702)	118 Greenwood St. 42°28′28″N 71°04′12″W		
62	House at 190 Main Street	House at 190 Main Street	July 6, 1989 (#89000666)	190 Main St. 42°30′49″N 71°04′27″W		
63	House at 193 Vernon Street	House at 193 Vernon Street	July 6, 1989 (#89000674)	193 Vernon St. 42°30′41″N 71°04′01″W		
64	House at 196 Main Street	House at 196 Main Street	July 6, 1989 (#89000668)	196 Main St. 42°30′47″N 71°04′27″W		
65	House at 380 Albion Street	House at 380 Albion Street	July 6, 1989 (#89000711)	380 Albion St. 42°29′32″N 71°05′08″W		
66	House at 509 North Avenue	House at 509 North Avenue	July 6, 1989 (#89000746)	509 North Ave. 42°30′35″N 71°04′54″W		
67	House at 556 Lowell Street	House at 556 Lowell Street	July 6, 1989 (#89000670)	556 Lowell St. 42°30′55″N 71°03′05″W		
68	Item Building	Item Building	July 6, 1989 (#89000712)	26 Albion St. 42°30′11″N 71°04′19″W		
69	Dr. Charles Jordan House	Dr. Charles Jordan House	July 6, 1989 (#89000716)	9 Jordan Ave. 42°29′55″N 71°05′08″W		
70	Deacon Thomas Kendall House	Deacon Thomas Kendall House	July 6, 1989 (#89000742)	One Prospect St. 42°30′20″N 71°04′48″W		
71	Lakeside Cemetery Chapel	Lakeside Cemetery Chapel	July 6, 1989 (#89000745)	North Ave. 42°30′36″N 71°04′51″W		
72	Lynnwood	Lynnwood	July 6, 1989 (#89000705)	5 Linden Ave. 42°29′25″N 71°04′20″W		
73	Massachusetts State Armory	Massachusetts State Armory	July 6, 1989 (#89000707)	Main St. 42°30′05″N 71°04′13″W		
74	Oliver House	Oliver House	April 15, 2014 (#14000157)	58 Oak Street; 42°29′10″N 71°03′44″W		
75	Dr. S. O. Richardson House	Dr. S. O. Richardson House	July 6, 1989 (#89000696)	694 Main St. 42°29′43″N 71°04′09″W		
76	Dr. Thomas Simpson House	Dr. Thomas Simpson House	July 6, 1989 (#89000665)	114 Main St. 42°31′06″N 71°04′35″W		
77	South Reading Academy	South Reading Academy	July 6, 1989 (#89000713)	7 Foster St. 42°30′11″N 71°04′19″W		
78	St. Joseph's School	St. Joseph's School	July 6, 1989 (#89000749)	15 Gould St. 42°30′02″N 71°04′45″W		
79	William Stimpson House	William Stimpson House	July 6, 1989 (#89000741)	22 Prospect St. 42°30′20″N 71°04′52″W		
80	Daniel Sweetser House	Daniel Sweetser House	July 6, 1989 (#89000669)	458 Lowell St. 42°31′00″N 71°03′32″W		
81	Michael Sweetser House	Michael Sweetser House	July 6, 1989 (#89000699)	15 Nahant St. 42°29′52″N 71°04′08″W		
82	Temple Israel Cemetery	Temple Israel Cemetery	July 6, 1989 (#89000753)	North Ave. 42°30′33″N 71°04′49″W		
83	D. Horace Tilton House	D. Horace Tilton House	July 6, 1989 (#89000715)	379 Albion St. 42°29′34″N 71°05′09″W		
84	US Post Office-Wakefield Main	US Post Office-Wakefield Main	October 19, 1987 (#86003439)	321 Main St. 42°30′18″N 71°04′19″W		
85	Wakefield Park	Wakefield Park	March 2, 1990 (#89000755)	Roughly Park Ave. between Summit Ave. and Chestnut St. 42°30′03″N 71°05′05″W		A late 19th century "garden suburb" residential subdivision.
86	Wakefield Rattan Co.	Wakefield Rattan Co.	July 6, 1989 (#89000692)	134 Water St. 42°30′11″N 71°03′59″W		Buildings demolished in 2005.
87	Wakefield Trust Company	Wakefield Trust Company	July 6, 1989 (#89000728)	371 Main St. 42°30′14″N 71°04′17″W		
88	Wakefield Upper Depot	Wakefield Upper Depot	July 6, 1989 (#89000719)	27–29 Tuttle St. 42°30′07″N 71°04′35″W		
89	H.M. Warren School	H.M. Warren School	July 6, 1989 (#89000750)	30 Converse St. 42°29′57″N 71°05′05″W		
90	West Ward School	West Ward School	July 6, 1989 (#89000748)	39 Prospect St. 42°30′21″N 71°04′59″W		
91	Suell Winn House	Suell Winn House	July 6, 1989 (#89000743)	72–74 Elm St. 42°30′33″N 71°05′04″W		
92	Charles Winship House	Charles Winship House	July 6, 1989 (#89000717)	13 Mansion Rd. 42°29′51″N 71°05′10″W		
93	Woodville School	Woodville School	July 6, 1989 (#89000694)	Farm St. 42°29′52″N 71°03′04″W		Listed building has been torn down.
94	Woodward Homestead	Woodward Homestead	July 6, 1989 (#89000747)	17 Main St. 42°31′27″N 71°04′46″W		
95	Yale Avenue Historic District	Yale Avenue Historic District	July 6, 1989 (#89000756)	16–25 Yale Ave. 42°30′18″N 71°04′25″W		
