= House at 52 Oak Street =

Historic house in Massachusetts, United States

- U.S. National Register of Historic Places
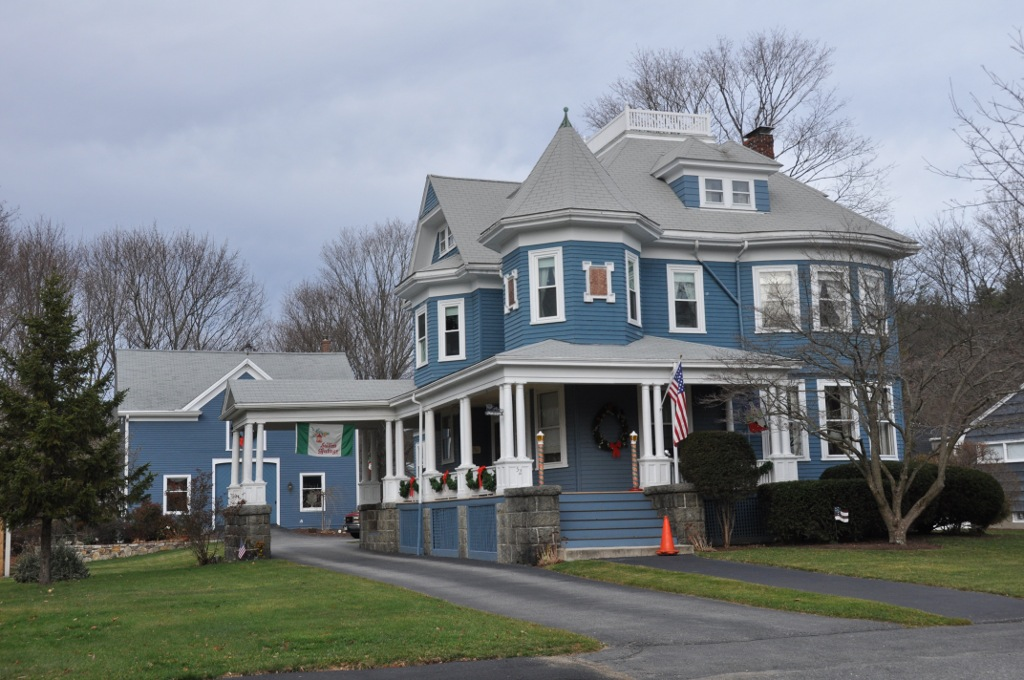

- Location within Massachusetts Location within the United States
- Location: 52 Oak St., Wakefield, Massachusetts
- Coordinates: 42°29′9.17″N 71°3′46.36″W
- Built: 1890
- Architectural style: Colonial Revival
- MPS: Wakefield MRA
- NRHP reference No.: 89000700
- Added to NRHP: July 06, 1989

The House at 52 Oak Street in Wakefield, Massachusetts is one of the most elaborate Colonial Revival houses in the Greenwood section of town. The 2 1/2-story wood-frame house was built in the 1890s. It has significant Queen Anne styling, including a turret and wraparound porch, but porch details such as the multiple columns on paneled piers are Colonial Revival in style, as are the hip-roof dormers. The house was built by Henry Savage, a developer with ultimately unsuccessful plans to develop the Greenwood area residentially in the 1880s.

The house was listed on the National Register of Historic Places in 1989.

== See also ==
- National Register of Historic Places listings in Wakefield, Massachusetts
- National Register of Historic Places listings in Middlesex County, Massachusetts
