= House at 95 Chestnut Street =

Historic house in Massachusetts, United States

- U.S. National Register of Historic Places
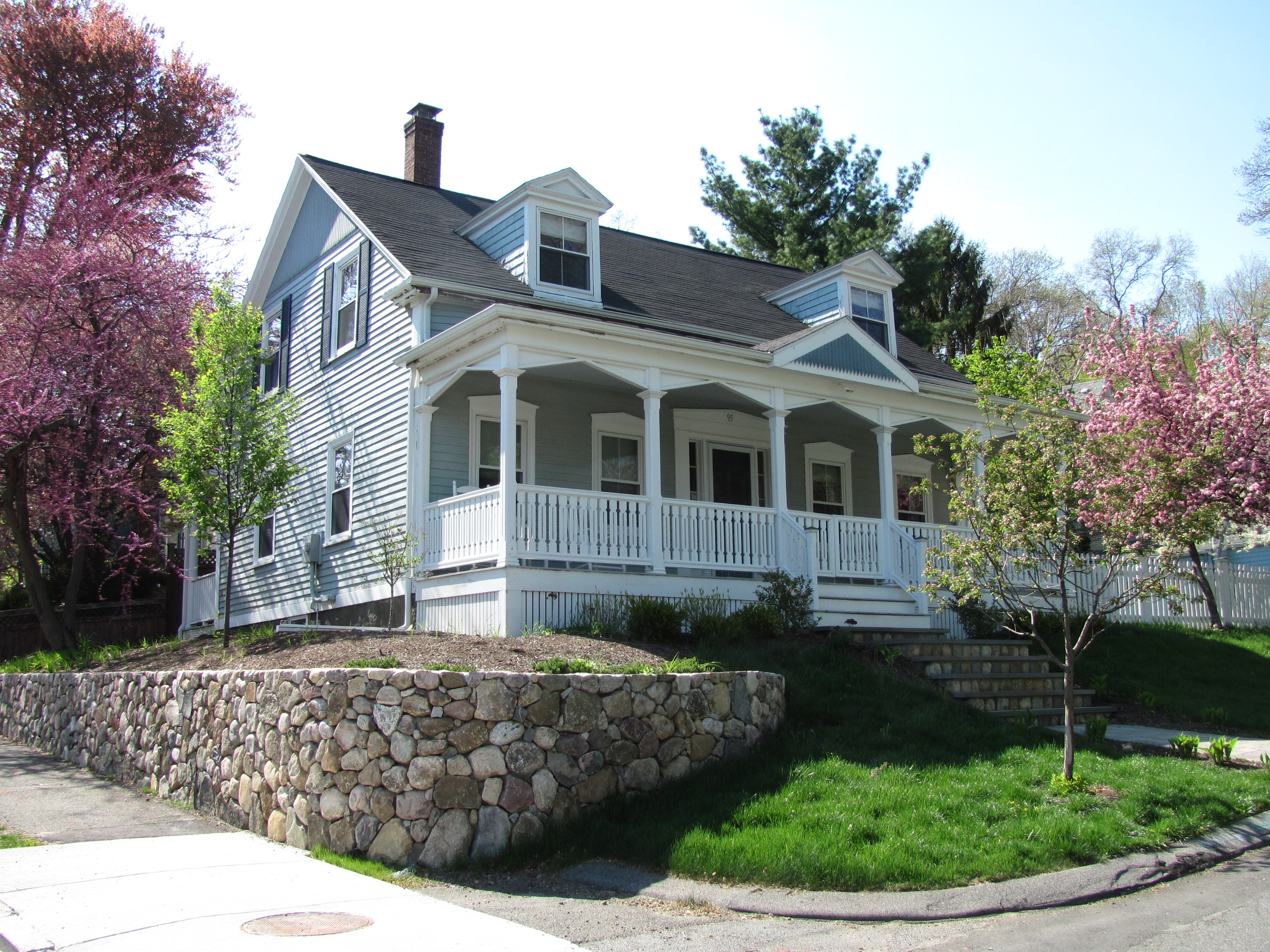

- Location within Massachusetts
- Location: 95 Chestnut Street, Wakefield, Massachusetts
- Coordinates: 42°30′6″N 71°5′0″W
- Built: 1849
- Architectural style: Greek Revival
- MPS: Wakefield MRA
- NRHP reference No.: 89000725
- Added to NRHP: July 06, 1989

95 Chestnut Street is a historic house located in Wakefield, Massachusetts. It is significant as an example of a well-preserved vernacular Greek Revival style house.

== Description and history ==
The 1 1/2-story wood-frame house was built in 1849 for Joshua Whittemore, who in 1862 invented a crutch (having lost a leg in an accident in 1850) that was sold worldwide. The house's gable end faces the street, with return eaves and wide corner boards. The front porch is a later Stick Style addition, with pediments and sawtooth ornamentation.

The house was listed on the National Register of Historic Places in 1989.

== See also ==
- National Register of Historic Places listings in Wakefield, Massachusetts
- National Register of Historic Places listings in Middlesex County, Massachusetts
