= House at 42 Hopkins Street =

Historic house in Massachusetts, United States

- U.S. National Register of Historic Places
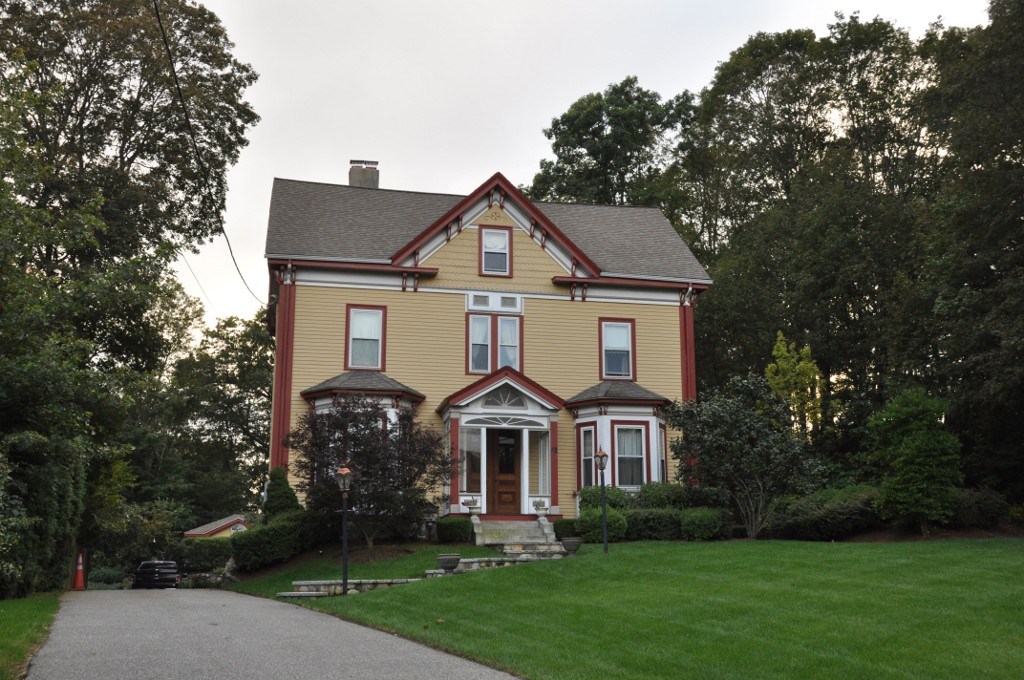

- Location within Massachusetts Location within the United States
- Location: 42 Hopkins St., Wakefield, Massachusetts
- Coordinates: 42°30′13″N 71°5′48″W
- Built: 1855
- Architectural style: Italianate
- MPS: Wakefield MRA
- NRHP reference No.: 89000732
- Added to NRHP: July 06, 1989

The House at 42 Hopkins Street in Wakefield, Massachusetts is an excellent early example of an Italianate house. Built c. 1850, the 2 1/2-story wood-frame structure is an early example of balloon framing (replacing the earlier mortise and tenon style). It is three bays wide, with wide eaves and double brackets, corner pilasters, and a high granite foundation. Its front entry is sheltered by Colonial Revival portico added around the turn of the 20th century.

The house was listed on the National Register of Historic Places in 1989.

== See also ==
- National Register of Historic Places listings in Wakefield, Massachusetts
- National Register of Historic Places listings in Middlesex County, Massachusetts
