= House at 39 Converse Street =

Historic house in Massachusetts, United States

- U.S. National Register of Historic Places
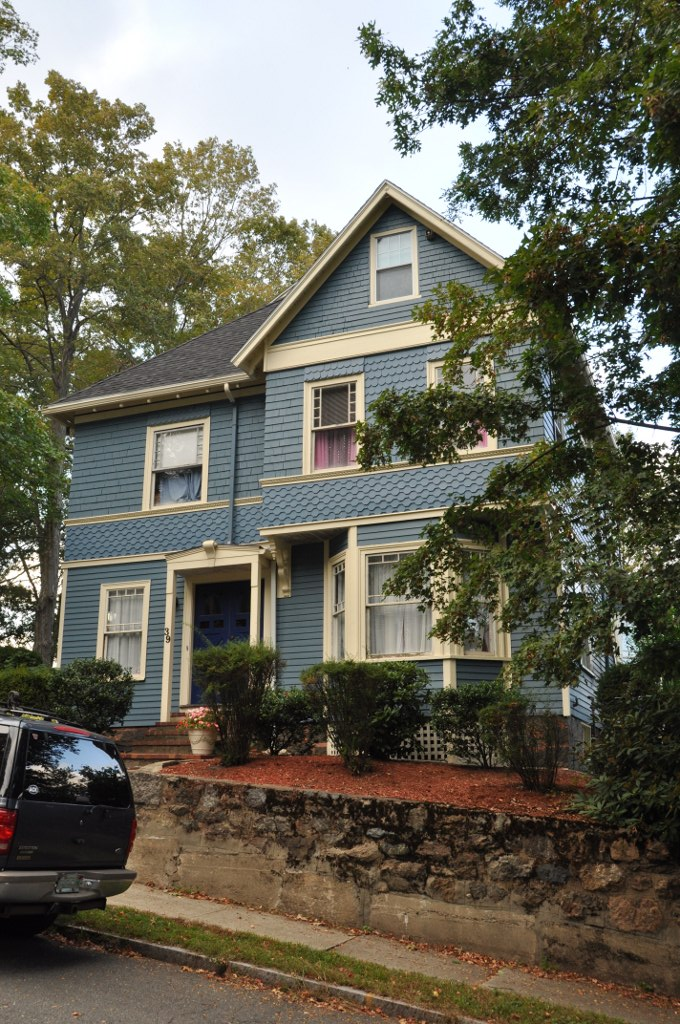

- Location within Massachusetts Location within the United States
- Location: 39 Converse St., Wakefield, Massachusetts
- Coordinates: 42°29′59″N 71°5′9″W
- Built: 1880
- Architectural style: Queen Anne
- MPS: Wakefield MRA
- NRHP reference No.: 89000718
- Added to NRHP: July 06, 1989

The House at 39 Converse Street in Wakefield, Massachusetts, United States, is a well-preserved Queen Anne Victorian house. It was built c. 1880 as part of a real estate development along Converse Street. It is a 2 1/2-story wood-frame structure, with a hip roof and cross gable. It features decorative shingle bands in sections on the second floor, and between the first and second floors. The L-shaped house has a second story projecting gabled section over a rounded projecting bay on the first floor.

The house was listed on the National Register of Historic Places in 1989.

== See also ==
- National Register of Historic Places listings in Wakefield, Massachusetts
- National Register of Historic Places listings in Middlesex County, Massachusetts
