= House at 113 Salem Street =

Historic house in Massachusetts, United States

- U.S. National Register of Historic Places
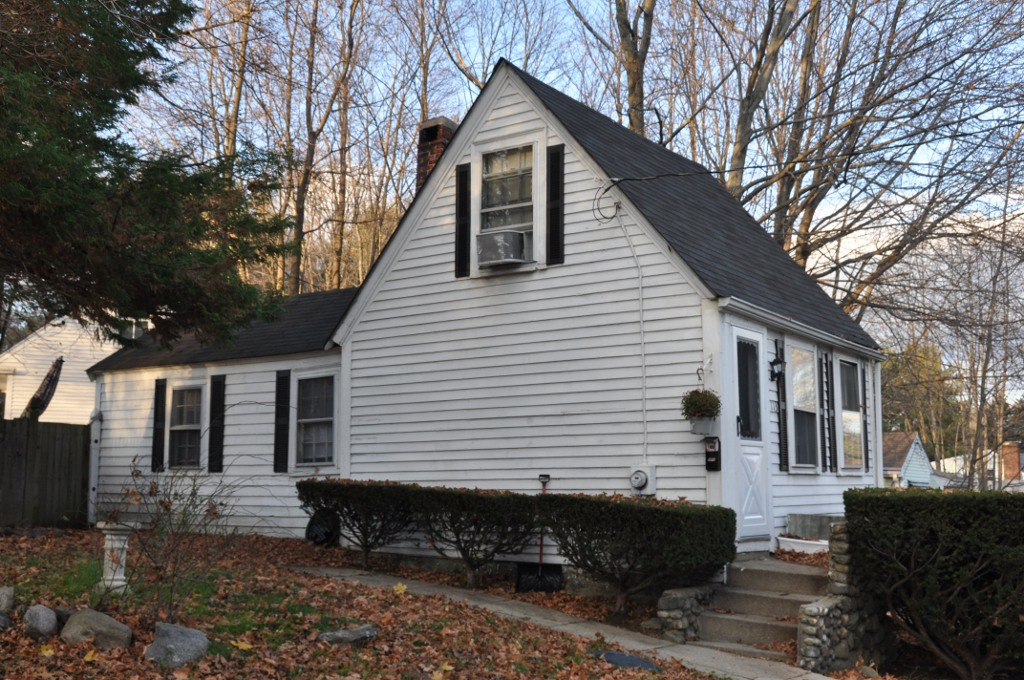

- Location within Massachusetts Location within the United States
- Location: 113 Salem St., Wakefield, Massachusetts
- Coordinates: 42°30′32.51″N 71°4′3.58″W
- MPS: Wakefield MRA
- NRHP reference No.: 89000688
- Added to NRHP: July 06, 1989

The House at 113 Salem Street in Wakefield, Massachusetts is a rare well-preserved example of a 19th-century shoemaker's shop. The 1 1/2-story wood-frame house was built in the 1840s or 1850s, and was originally the shoe shop of David Nichols, who lived at 103 Salem Street. Its early form, with the high-pitch, gable roof, is readily recognizable despite later alterations and additions. These types of buildings were once common in the town, where shoemaking was a home-based cottage industry.

The house was listed on the National Register of Historic Places in 1989.

== See also ==
- National Register of Historic Places listings in Wakefield, Massachusetts
- National Register of Historic Places listings in Middlesex County, Massachusetts
