= House at 40 Crescent Street =

Historic house in Massachusetts, United States

- U.S. National Register of Historic Places
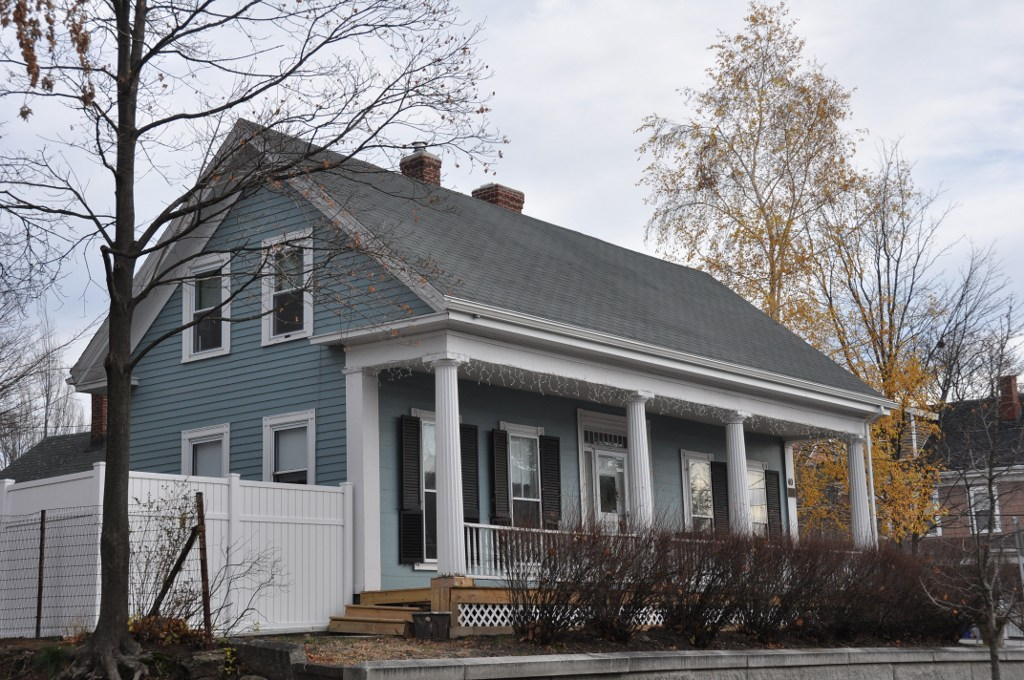

- Location within Massachusetts Location within the United States
- Location: 40 Crescent St., Wakefield, Massachusetts
- Coordinates: 42°30′13″N 71°4′8″W
- Built: 1839
- Architect: Hutchinson, Abel F.
- Architectural style: Greek Revival
- MPS: Wakefield MRA
- NRHP reference No.: 89000691
- Added to NRHP: July 06, 1989

40 Crescent Street is a historic house in Wakefield, Massachusetts, and is significant as a particularly fine example of a Greek Revival style house.

== Description and history ==
Built in 1839, the 1 1/2-story wood-frame house has a roof that is cantilevered over the front of the house, where it is supported by Doric columns. Doors and windows both have architrave surrounds, and both the front door and the side door have sidelight windows. The house was built by Abel Hutchinson, a shoemaker, and remains in the hands of his descendants.

The house was listed on the National Register of Historic Places on July 6, 1989.

== See also ==
- National Register of Historic Places listings in Wakefield, Massachusetts
- National Register of Historic Places listings in Middlesex County, Massachusetts
