= House at 22 Parker Road =

Historic house in Massachusetts, United States

- U.S. National Register of Historic Places
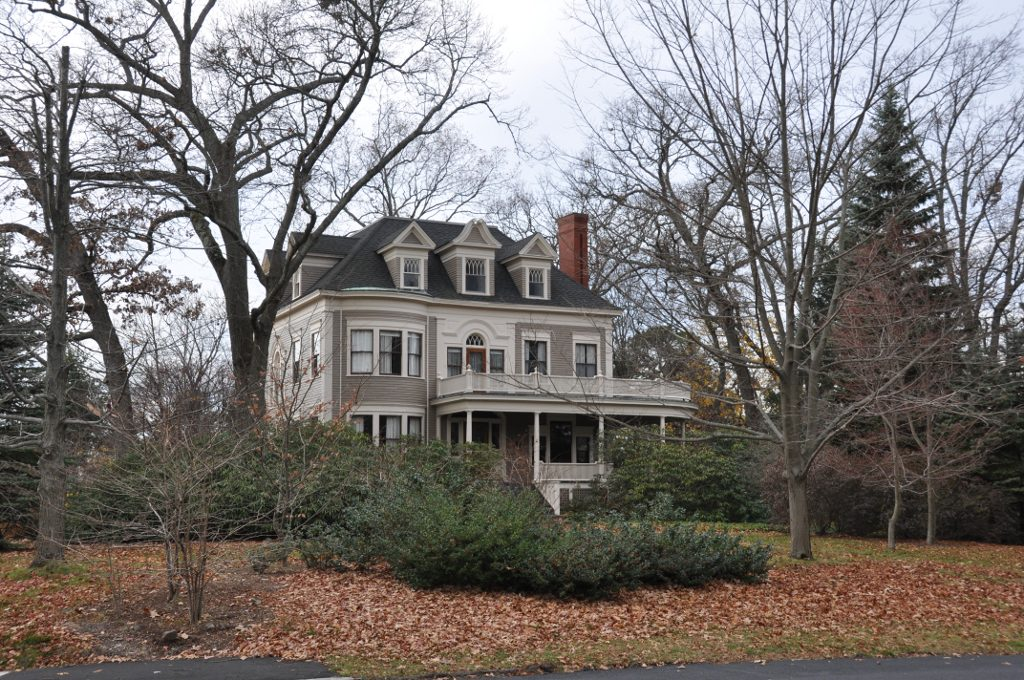

- Location within Massachusetts Location within the United States
- Location: 22 Parker Rd., Wakefield, Massachusetts
- Coordinates: 42°30′17″N 71°5′16″W
- Architectural style: Colonial Revival
- MPS: Wakefield MRA
- NRHP reference No.: 89000735
- Added to NRHP: July 06, 1989

The House at 22 Parker Road is one of a few high style Colonial Revival houses in Wakefield, Massachusetts. The 2 1/2-story wood-frame house is estimated to have been built in the 1880s. It has a hip roof, corner pilasters, and gable end dormers, the center one having a swan-neck design. The main facade is divided into three sections: the leftmost has a rounded bay with three windows on each level, and the right section has a Palladian window configuration on the first floor, and a pair of windows on the second. The central section has the front door, sheltered by a porch that wraps around to the right side, flanked by sidelights and topped by a fanlight. Above the front door is a porch door flanked by wide windows and topped by a half-round window with Gothic style insets.

The house was listed on the National Register of Historic Places in 1989.

== See also ==
- National Register of Historic Places listings in Wakefield, Massachusetts
- National Register of Historic Places listings in Middlesex County, Massachusetts
