= House at 196 Main Street =

Historic house in Massachusetts, United States

- U.S. National Register of Historic Places
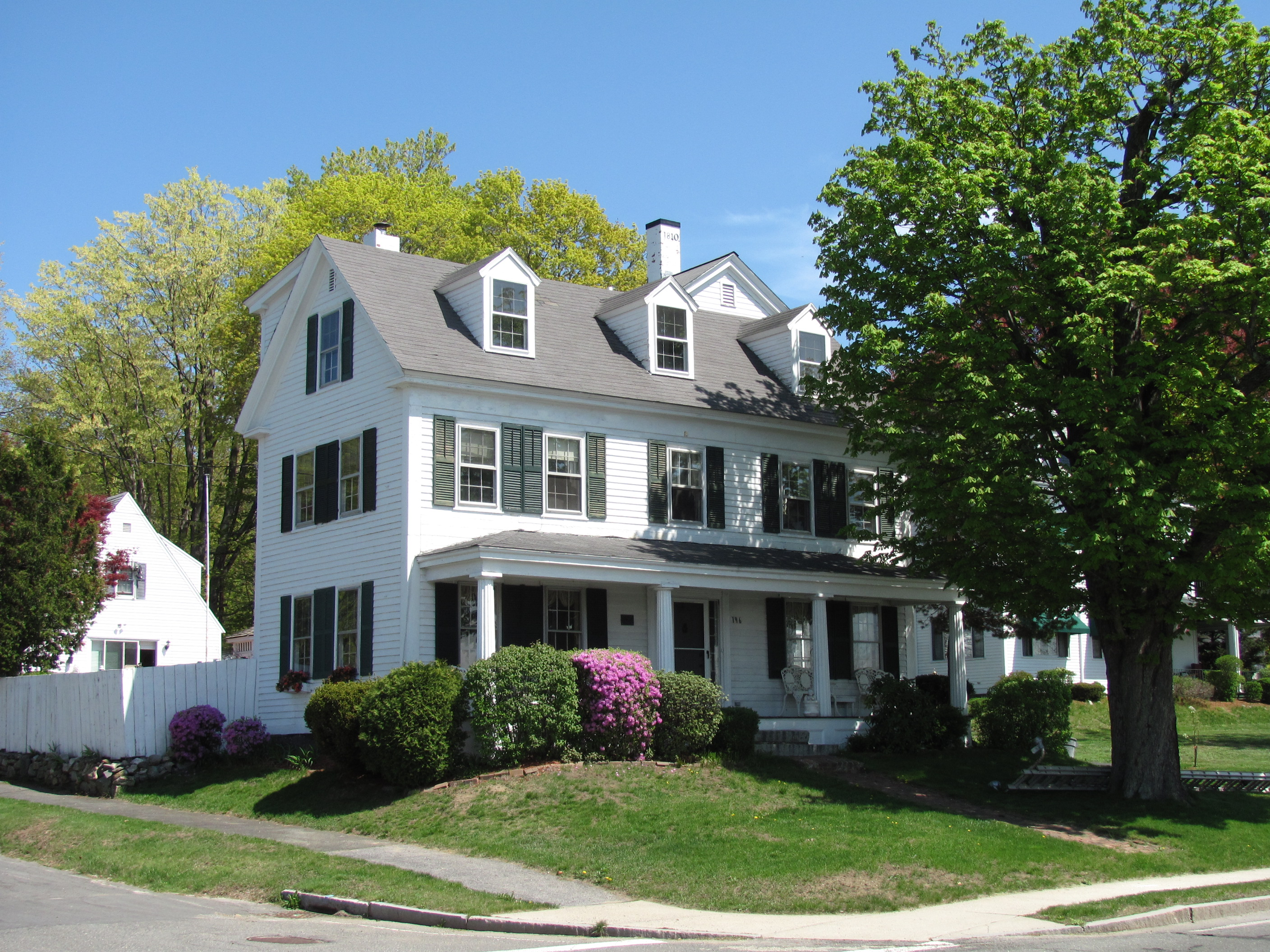
- House at 196 Main Street

- Location within Massachusetts Location within the United States
- Location: 196 Main St., Wakefield, Massachusetts
- Coordinates: 42°30′47″N 71°4′27″W
- Architectural style: Greek Revival
- MPS: Wakefield MRA
- NRHP reference No.: 89000668
- Added to NRHP: July 06, 1989

The House at 196 Main Street (also known as the Hiram Eaton House) is a historic house located at 196 Main Street in Wakefield, Massachusetts.

== Description and history ==
The house was built in the 1840s or 1850s, probably for Hiram Eaton, member of a locally prominent family. The house is a well-preserved Greek Revival house, 2 1/2 stories in height and five bays wide, with a side-gable roof pierced by three gabled dormers. It has a side-hall plan and its front porch is supported by delicately fluted columns, a rarity in the town for the period indicating means and sophistication.

The house was listed on the National Register of Historic Places on July 6, 1989.

== See also ==
- National Register of Historic Places listings in Wakefield, Massachusetts
- National Register of Historic Places listings in Middlesex County, Massachusetts
