= House at 7 Salem Street =

Historic house in Massachusetts, United States

- U.S. National Register of Historic Places
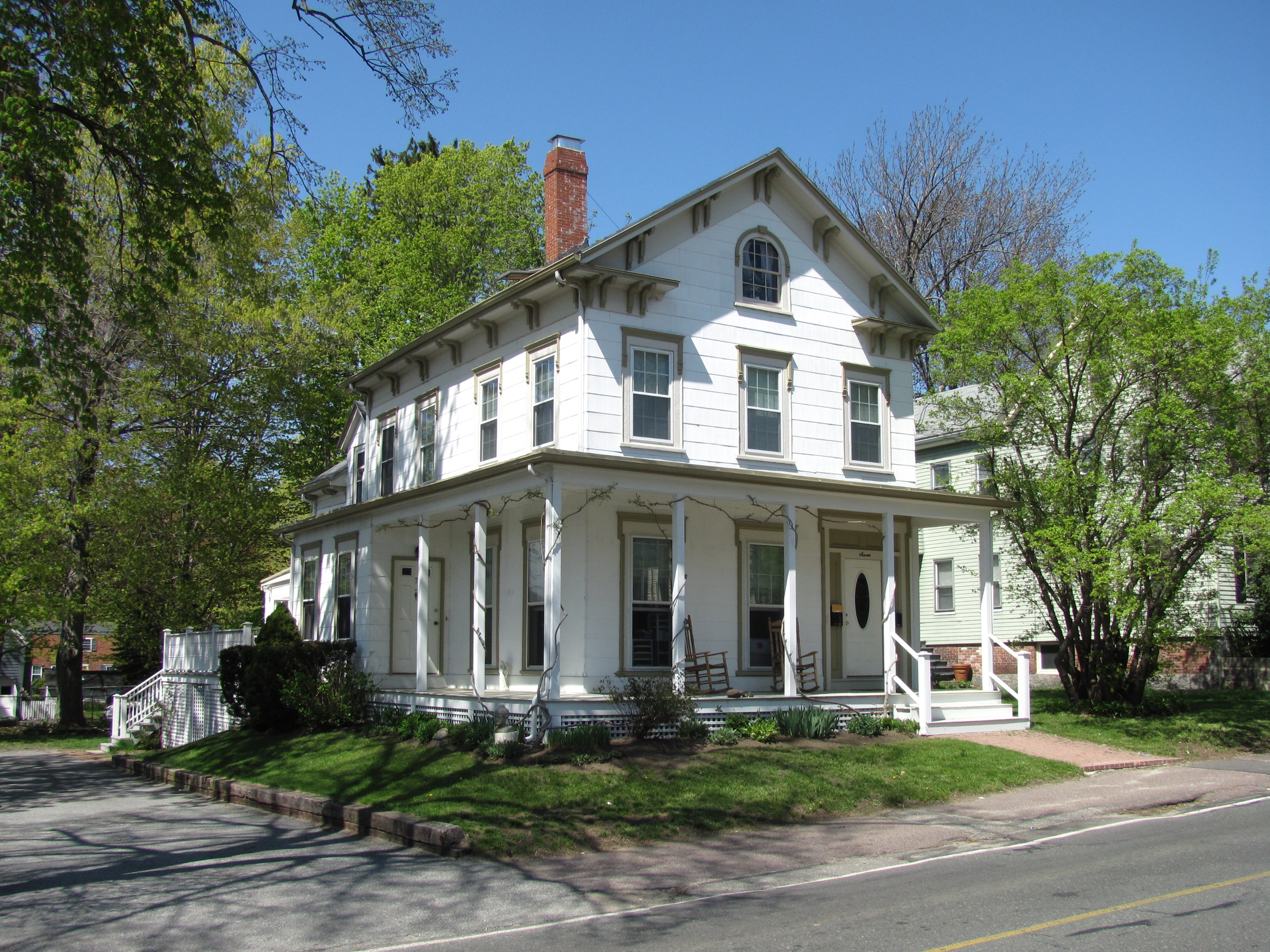

- Location within Massachusetts Location within the United States
- Location: 7 Salem St., Wakefield, Massachusetts
- Coordinates: 42°30′30.18″N 71°4′14.24″W
- Built: 1855
- Architectural style: Italianate
- MPS: Wakefield MRA
- NRHP reference No.: 89000683
- Added to NRHP: July 06, 1989

The House at 7 Salem Street in Wakefield, Massachusetts is a transitional Greek Revival/Italianate style house built c. 1855–57. The 2 1/2-story wood-frame house has a typical Greek Revival side hall plan, with door and window surrounds that are also typical to that style. However, it also bears clear Italianate styling with the arched window in the gable, and the paired brackets in the eaves. A single-story porch wraps around the front and side, supported by simple square columns. Its occupant in 1857 was a ticket agent for the Boston and Maine Railroad.

The house was listed on the National Register of Historic Places in 1989.

== See also ==
- National Register of Historic Places listings in Wakefield, Massachusetts
- National Register of Historic Places listings in Middlesex County, Massachusetts
