= House at 556 Lowell Street =

Historic house in Massachusetts, United States

- U.S. National Register of Historic Places
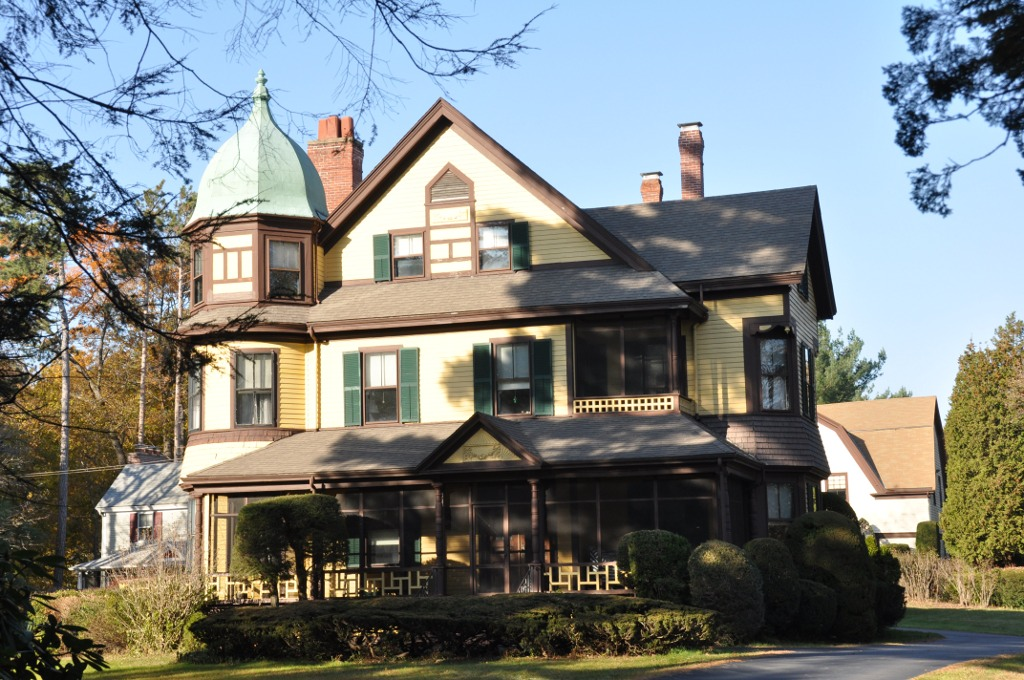

- Location within Massachusetts Location within the United States
- Location: 556 Lowell St., Wakefield, Massachusetts
- Coordinates: 42°30′55″N 71°3′5″W
- Built: 1894
- Architectural style: Colonial Revival, Queen Anne
- MPS: Wakefield MRA
- NRHP reference No.: 89000670
- Added to NRHP: July 06, 1989

The House at 556 Lowell Street in Wakefield, Massachusetts is a high style Queen Anne Victorian in the Montrose section of town. The 2 1/2-story wood-frame house was built in 1894, probably for Denis Lyons, a Boston wine merchant. The house is asymmetrically massed, with a three-story turret topped by an eight-sided dome roof on the left side, and a single-story porch that wraps partially onto the right side, with a small gable over the stairs to the front door. That porch and a small second-story porch above are both decorated with Stick style woodwork. There is additional decoration, more in a Colonial Revival style, in main front gable and on the turret.

The house was listed on the National Register of Historic Places in 1989.

== See also ==
- National Register of Historic Places listings in Wakefield, Massachusetts
- National Register of Historic Places listings in Middlesex County, Massachusetts
