= Flanley's Block =

- U.S. National Register of Historic Places
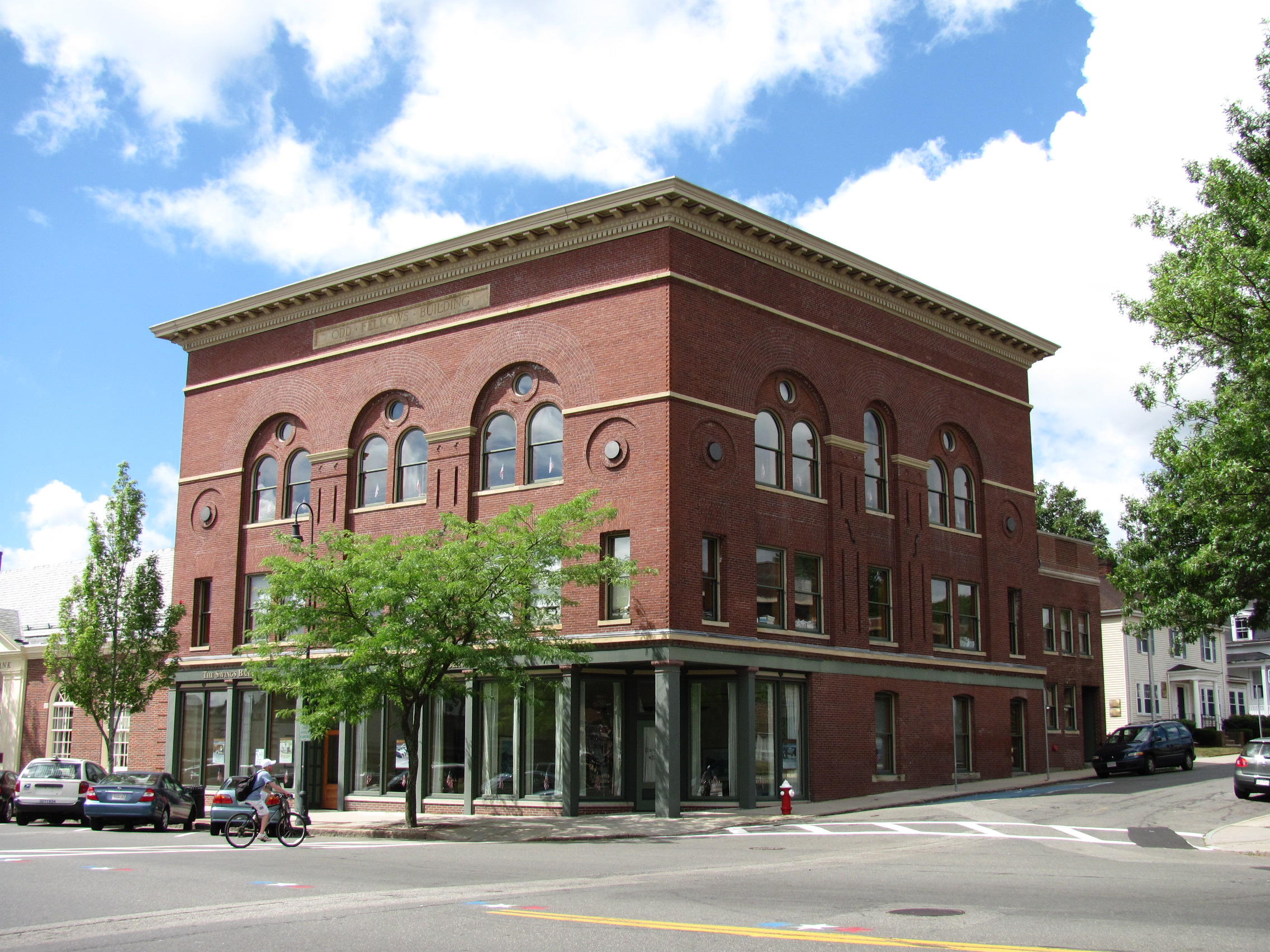
- Flanley's Block

- Location within Massachusetts Location within the United States
- Location: 349-353 Main St., Wakefield, Massachusetts
- Coordinates: 42°30′16″N 71°4′19″W
- Area: less than one acre
- Built: 1895
- Architectural style: Renaissance
- MPS: Wakefield MRA
- NRHP reference No.: 89000729
- Added to NRHP: July 06, 1989

Flanley's Block is a historic commercial building at 349–353 Main Street in Wakefield, Massachusetts, US. Built about 1895, it is a well-preserved local example of late 19th-century Italianate commercial architecture. The building was listed on the National Register of Historic Places in 1989.

== Description and history ==
Flanley's Block is located on the west side of Main Street, near the northern end of the business district and just south of the town's major civic buildings. It is a three-story brick structure with Italianate styling, including a flat roof with an extended modillioned cornice. The main facade, facing east, has storefronts on the ground floor, with plate glass windows and recessed entrances. It retains significant Italianate features, including an extended cornice and smaller round-arch windows. The latter are set by pairs in recessed arches, where each pair is topped by a small round window. Second- and third-floor windows are grouped pairs inside recessed panels with round-arch tops. The third-floor windows also have round-arch tops, with rondels above each pair in the panel. Medallion motifs are located at the outer bays of the facade on the third floor.

The building was originally built in 1895 by John Flanley, a local furniture salesman. Flanley, a Wakefield native, joined the firm of Gammers and Trow in 1866, and eventually took over their business. Goods he sold included furniture, bedding, carpet, and wallpaper. In 1918 the building was adapted for use by the local branch of the International Order of Odd Fellows.

== See also ==
- National Register of Historic Places listings in Wakefield, Massachusetts
- National Register of Historic Places listings in Middlesex County, Massachusetts
