= House at 15 Chestnut Street =

Historic house in Massachusetts, United States

- 15 Chestnut Street, Wakefield, MA
- U.S. National Register of Historic Places
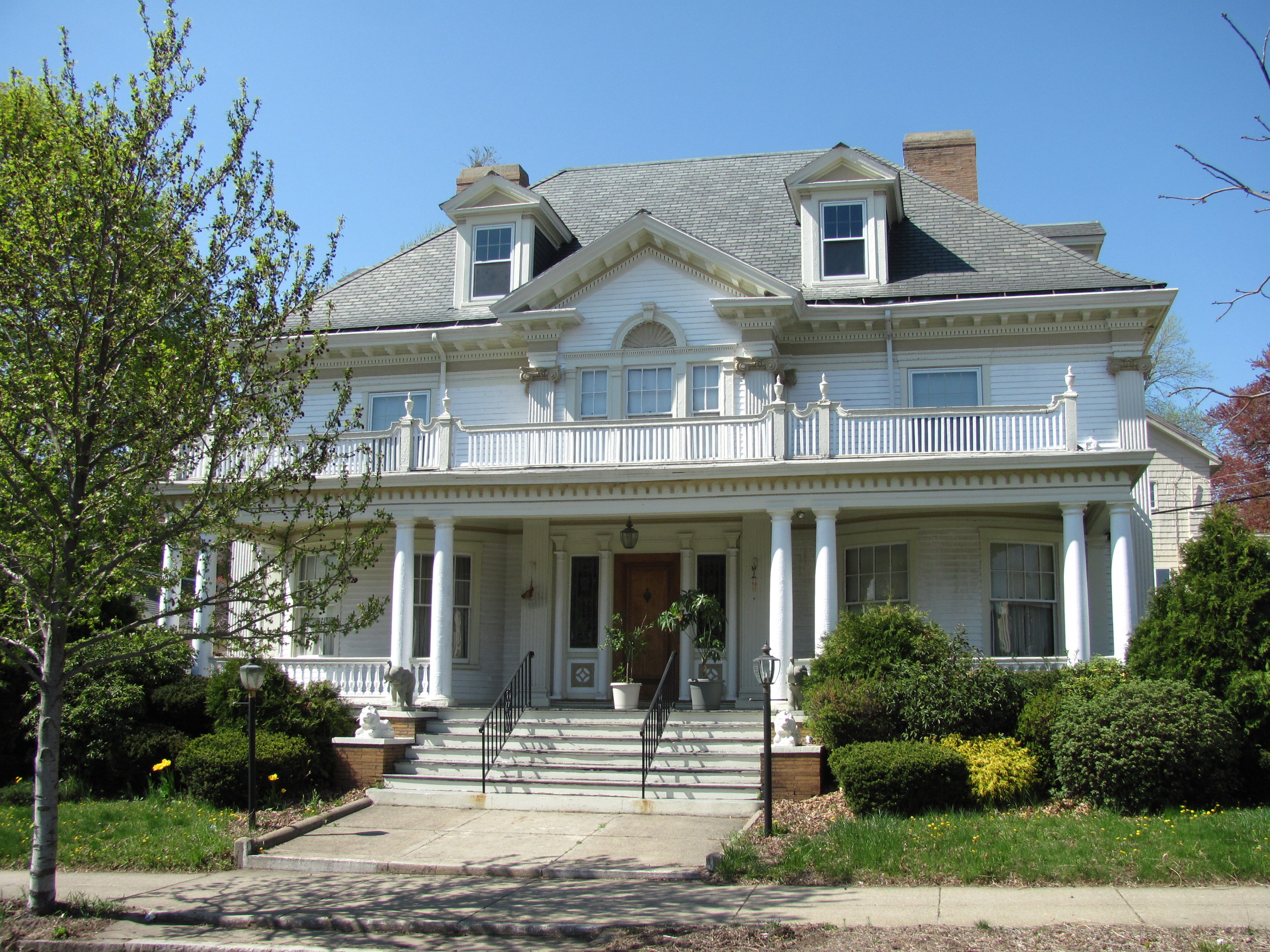
- House at 15 Chestnut Street

- Location within Massachusetts Location within the United States
- Location: 15 Chestnut St., Wakefield, Massachusetts
- Coordinates: 42°30′13″N 71°4′26″W
- Built: 1885
- Architectural style: Colonial Revival
- MPS: Wakefield MRA
- NRHP reference No.: 89000726
- Added to NRHP: July 06, 1989

The House at 15 Chestnut Street in Wakefield, Massachusetts is a well preserved high style Colonial Revival house. It was built in 1889 for Thomas Skinner, a Boston bookkeeper. The 2 1/2-story wood-frame house is topped by a hipped roof with flared eaves and a heavily decorated cornice. A porch extends across the front of the house, which is supported by paired turned columns. Above on the porch is a low railing with paired pillars (matching the support columns in position) topped by urns. The front door is flanked by Ionic pilasters, then sidelight windows, and then another pair of pilasters.

The house was listed on the National Register of Historic Places in 1989.

== See also ==
- National Register of Historic Places listings in Wakefield, Massachusetts
- National Register of Historic Places listings in Middlesex County, Massachusetts
