= House at 28 Wiley Street =

Historic house in Massachusetts, United States

- U.S. National Register of Historic Places
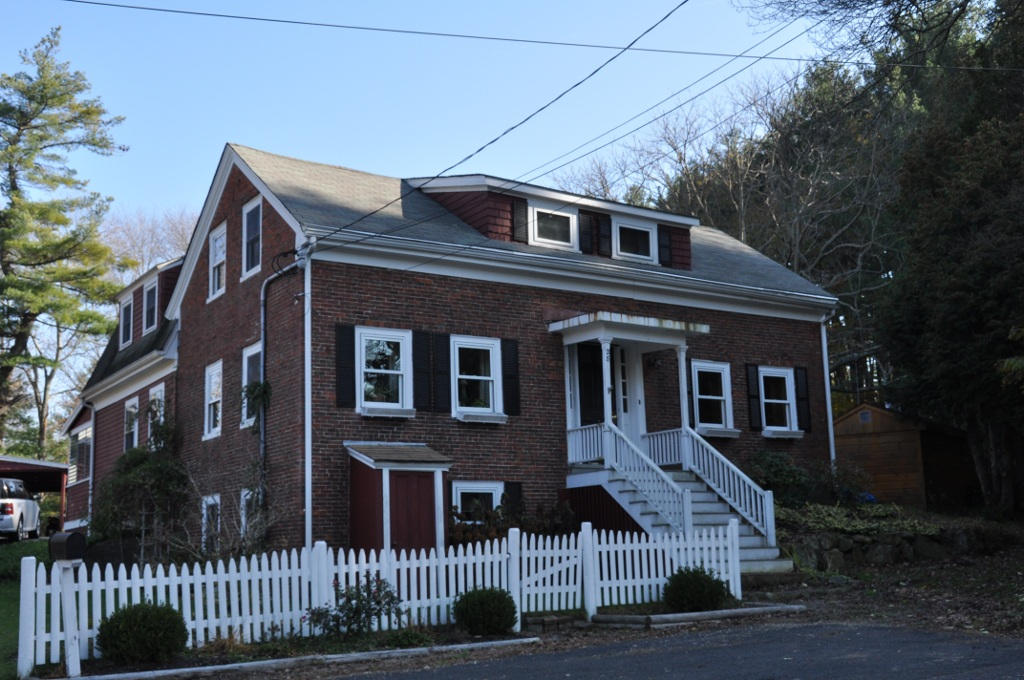

- Location within Massachusetts Location within the United States
- Location: 28 Wiley St., Wakefield, Massachusetts
- Coordinates: 42°29′50″N 71°2′50″W
- Architectural style: Federal, Vernacular Federal
- MPS: Wakefield MRA
- NRHP reference No.: 89000695
- Added to NRHP: July 06, 1989

The House at 28 Wiley Street in Wakefield, Massachusetts is an unusual Federal or Georgian style house. It is built of brick, a rare construction material in pre-Revolutionary Wakefield. It appears to have been built as an addition to another house, which has since been destroyed. Built into a hill, it presents 1.5 stories in front, and 2.5 stories in back. It has a tradition five bay main facade with a central door, which was embellished with a Federal style surround sometime after its initial construction. The house was probably built for a member of the Wiley family.

The house was listed on the National Register of Historic Places in 1989.

== See also ==
- National Register of Historic Places listings in Wakefield, Massachusetts
- National Register of Historic Places listings in Middlesex County, Massachusetts
