= House at 13 Sheffield Road =

Historic house in Massachusetts, United States

- U.S. National Register of Historic Places
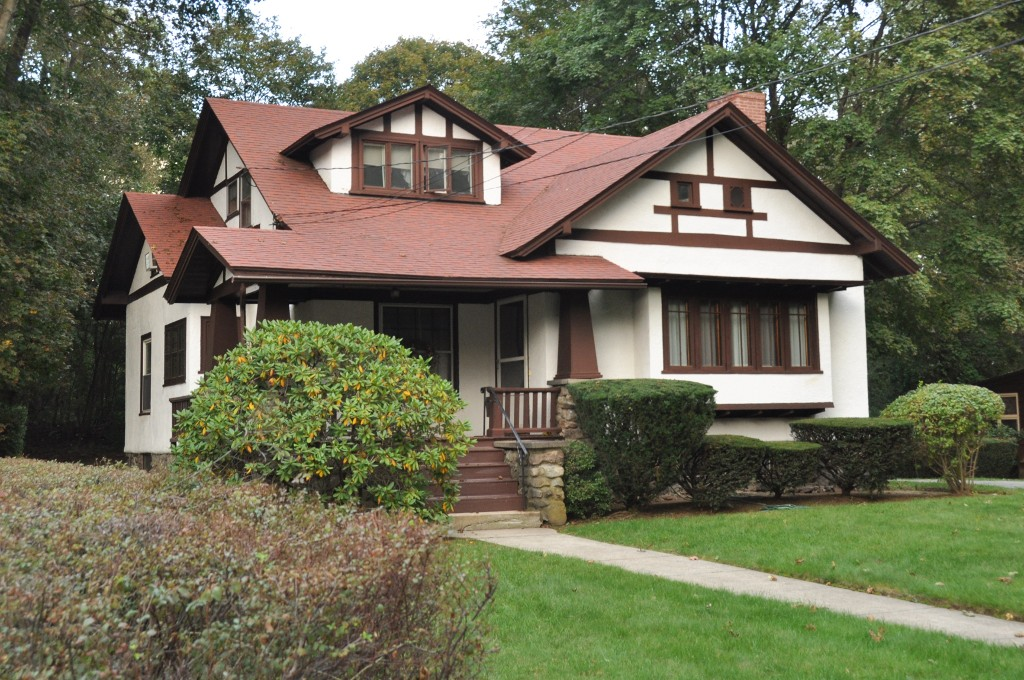

- Location within Massachusetts Location within the United States
- Location: 13 Sheffield Rd., Wakefield, Massachusetts
- Coordinates: 42°30′12″N 71°5′22″W
- Area: less than one acre
- Built: 1918
- Architectural style: Bungalow/Craftsman
- MPS: Wakefield MRA
- NRHP reference No.: 89000734
- Added to NRHP: July 06, 1989

The House at 13 Sheffield Road in Wakefield, Massachusetts is a well-preserved Craftsman/Bungalow style house. The 1 1/2-story house was built c. 1918 out of fieldstone with a stucco exterior. The roof has extended eaves with exposed purlins, and a large cross-gable section on the right side. Strapwork on the walls give the house a Tudor Revival appearance. The subdivision in which it was built was laid out in 1916 in an area known as Cowdrey's Hill, after an early settler.

The house was listed on the National Register of Historic Places in 1989.

== See also ==
- National Register of Historic Places listings in Wakefield, Massachusetts
- National Register of Historic Places listings in Middlesex County, Massachusetts
