= House at 5 Bennett Street =

Historic house in Massachusetts, United States

- U.S. National Register of Historic Places
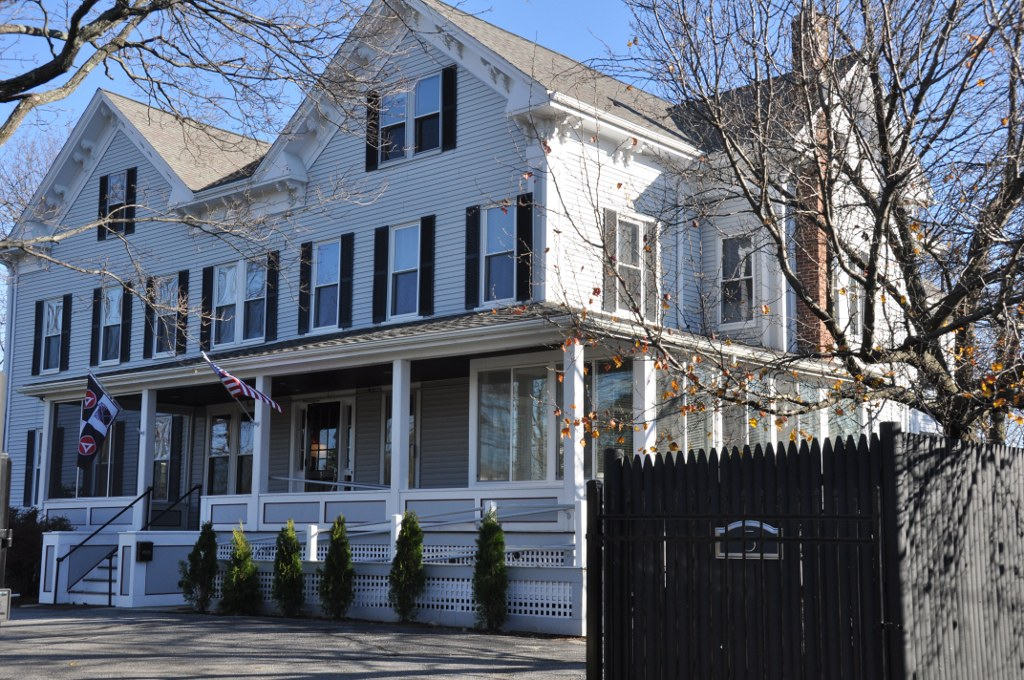

- Location within Massachusetts Location within the United States
- Location: 5 Bennett St., Wakefield, Massachusetts
- Coordinates: 42°29′59″N 71°4′10″W
- Built: 1875
- Architectural style: Italianate
- MPS: Wakefield MRA
- NRHP reference No.: 89000698
- Added to NRHP: July 06, 1989

The House at 5 Bennett Street in Wakefield, Massachusetts, is also known as the Wakefield House for Aged Women, and is one of the largest houses in Wakefield's Junction District. The original part of the house was built sometime between 1875 and 1881, with Italianate styling. It was probably built for an executive of the Wakefield Rattan Company. In 1894 the house was purchased by the Wakefield House for Aged Women, a charity established by local Protestant churches, and significantly expanded. During this major alteration some of the house's Italianate details were copied, and a Queen Anne style porch was added.

The building was listed on the National Register of Historic Places in 1989.

== See also ==
- National Register of Historic Places listings in Wakefield, Massachusetts
- National Register of Historic Places listings in Middlesex County, Massachusetts
