= House at 509 North Avenue =

Historic house in Massachusetts, United States

- U.S. National Register of Historic Places
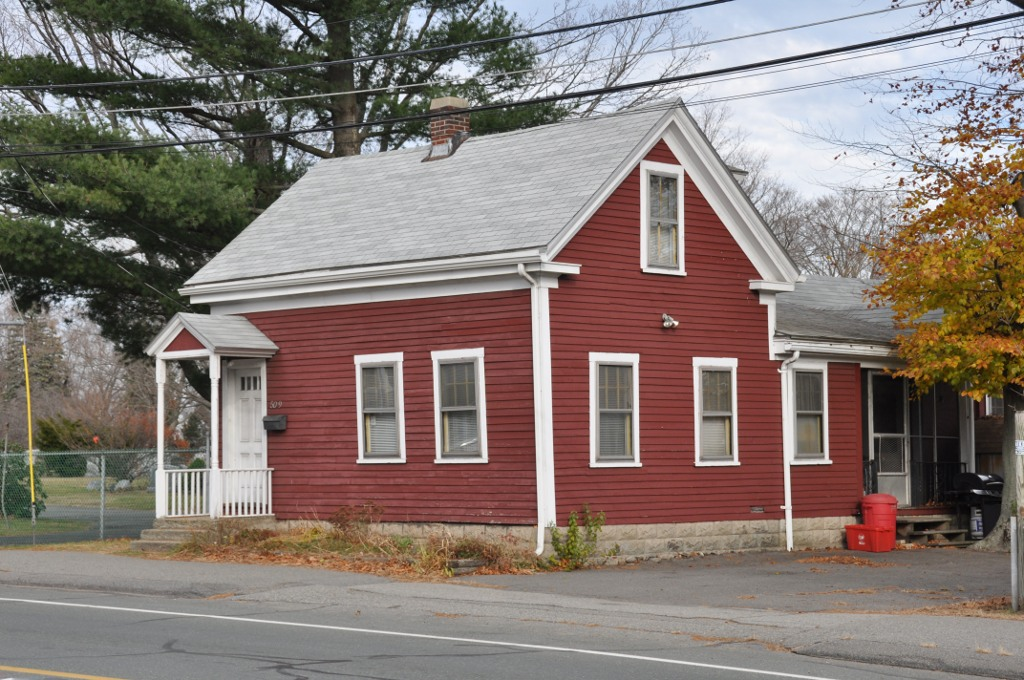

- Location within Massachusetts Location within the United States
- Location: 509 North Ave., Wakefield, Massachusetts
- Coordinates: 42°30′35″N 71°4′54″W
- Area: less than one acre
- Built: 1848
- Architectural style: Greek Revival, Italianate
- MPS: Wakefield MRA
- NRHP reference No.: 89000746
- Added to NRHP: July 06, 1989

The House at 509 North Avenue in Wakefield, Massachusetts is a small Greek Revival cottage. The single story wood-frame house was built c. 1848 and moved to its present location c. 1869. The house is three bays wide and one deep, and exhibits very simple Greek Revival styling, including a boxed cornice and simple door and window surrounds. This house was probably built on land subdivided from holdings of ice companies working on nearby Lake Quannapowitt. Its earliest documented resident was listed in the town's 1869 directory as a shoemaker.

The house was listed on the National Register of Historic Places in 1989.

== See also ==
- National Register of Historic Places listings in Wakefield, Massachusetts
- National Register of Historic Places listings in Middlesex County, Massachusetts
