= Daniel Sweetser House =

Historic house in Massachusetts, United States

- U.S. National Register of Historic Places
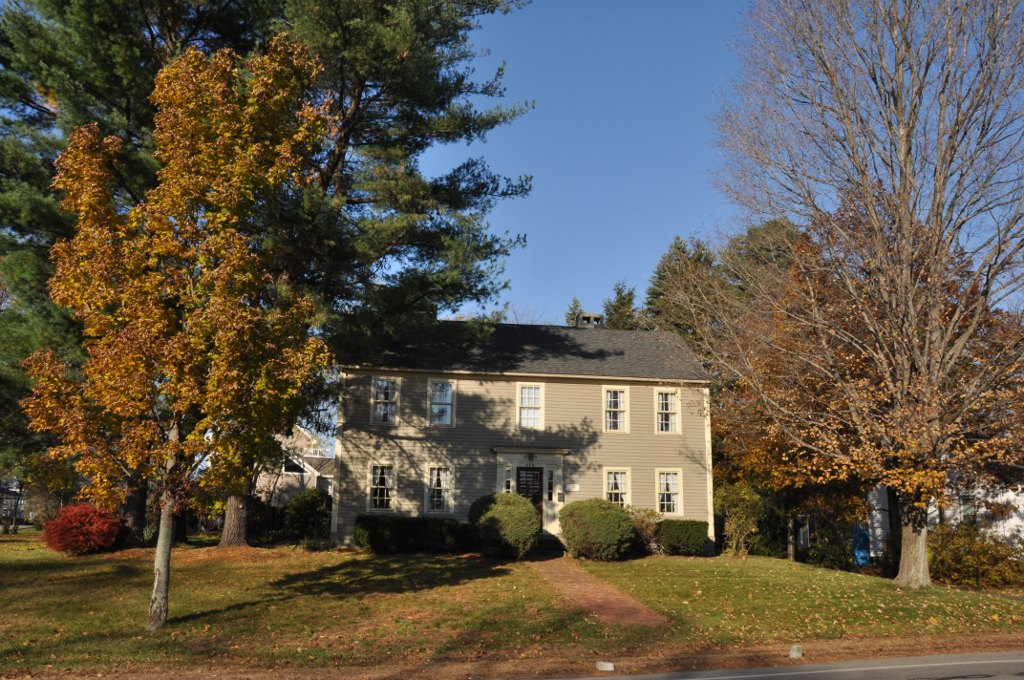

- Location within Massachusetts Location within the United States
- Location: 458 Lowell St., Wakefield, Massachusetts
- Coordinates: 42°31′0″N 71°3′32″W
- Built: 1780
- Architectural style: Federal
- MPS: Wakefield MRA
- NRHP reference No.: 89000669
- Added to NRHP: July 06, 1989

The Daniel Sweetser House is a historic house at 458 Lowell Street in Wakefield, Massachusetts. The 2 1/2-story timber-frame house was built sometime before 1795, probably for Daniel Sweetser, who then occupied the property. It is a conservative Federal style house with two interior chimneys, and is one of the town's better preserved rural properties of the period. Its most notable resident was James Mansfield, the town's first postal letter carrier.

The house was listed on the National Register of Historic Places in 1989.

== See also ==
- National Register of Historic Places listings in Wakefield, Massachusetts
- National Register of Historic Places listings in Middlesex County, Massachusetts
