= House at 19–21 Salem Street =

Historic house in Massachusetts, United States

- U.S. National Register of Historic Places
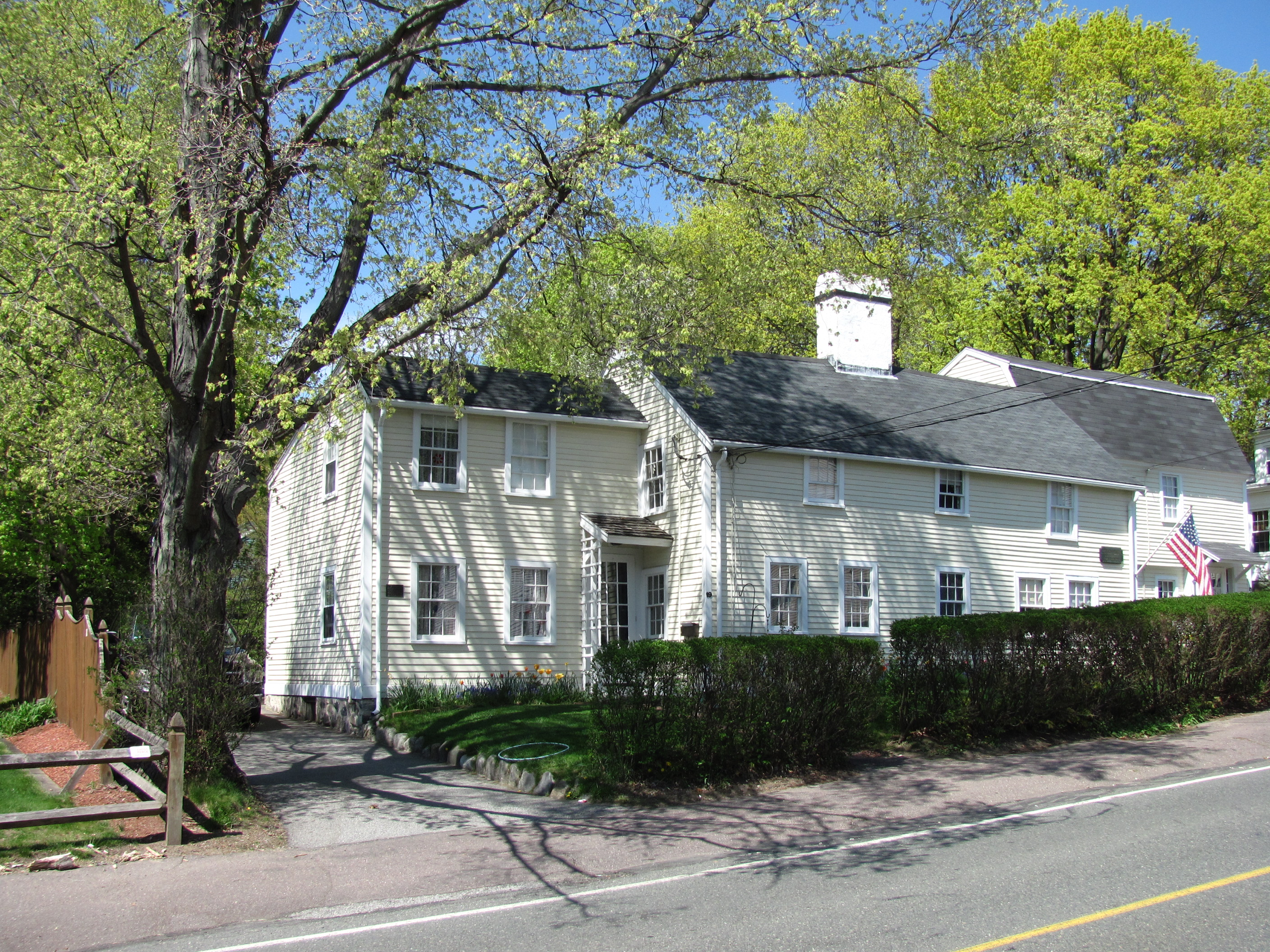
- House at 19 Salem Street

- Location within Massachusetts Location within the United States
- Location: 19–21 Salem St., Wakefield, Massachusetts
- Coordinates: 42°30′31″N 71°4′11″W
- Architect: Gould, Joseph
- Architectural style: Georgian, Vernacular Georgian
- MPS: Wakefield MRA
- NRHP reference No.: 89000684
- Added to NRHP: July 06, 1989

The House at 19–21 Salem Street in Wakefield, Massachusetts is an unusual 18th-century two-family residence. It is composed of two different houses that were conjoined c. 1795. The left house has a gabled roof and asymmetrical window placement, while the right house has a gambrel roof and an early 20th-century entry hood. It is probable that both houses were built by Joseph Gould, who occupied the eastern of the two houses, between 1765 and 1795. Despite subsequent alterations, the Georgian/Federal styling of the building remains apparent.

The house was listed on the National Register of Historic Places in 1989.

== See also ==
- National Register of Historic Places listings in Wakefield, Massachusetts
- National Register of Historic Places listings in Middlesex County, Massachusetts
