= House at 18 Park Street =

Historic house in Massachusetts, United States

- U.S. National Register of Historic Places
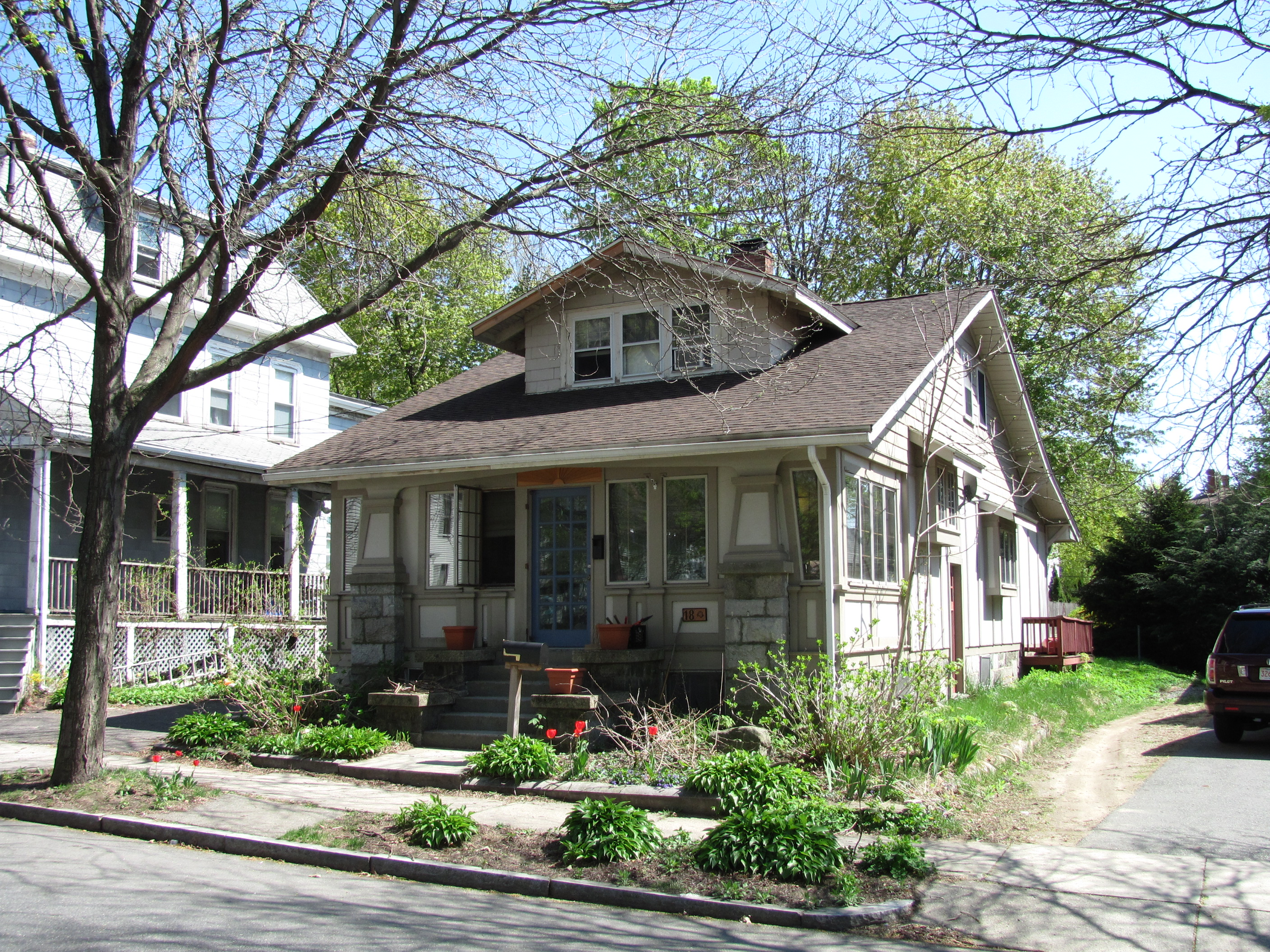
- House at 18 Park Street

- Location within Massachusetts Location within the United States
- Location: 18 Park St., Wakefield, Massachusetts
- Coordinates: 42°30′23″N 71°4′13″W
- Built: 1922
- Architectural style: Bungalow/Craftsman
- MPS: Wakefield MRA
- NRHP reference No.: 89000690
- Added to NRHP: July 06, 1989

The House at 18 Park Street, also known as the Clarence A. Van Derveer House, is a historic house at 18 Park Street in Wakefield, Massachusetts. The 1 1/2-story Craftsman/Bungalow style house was built in 1922 by Clarence A Van Derveer, a real estate broker who lived next door and subdivided his lot to build this house. It has classic Craftsman features, including exposed rafters under extended eaves (which shelter a porch), and paneled porch pillars and rails.

The house was listed on the National Register of Historic Places in 1989.

== See also ==
- National Register of Historic Places listings in Wakefield, Massachusetts
- National Register of Historic Places listings in Middlesex County, Massachusetts
