= House at 30 Sheffield Road =

Historic house in Massachusetts, United States

- U.S. National Register of Historic Places
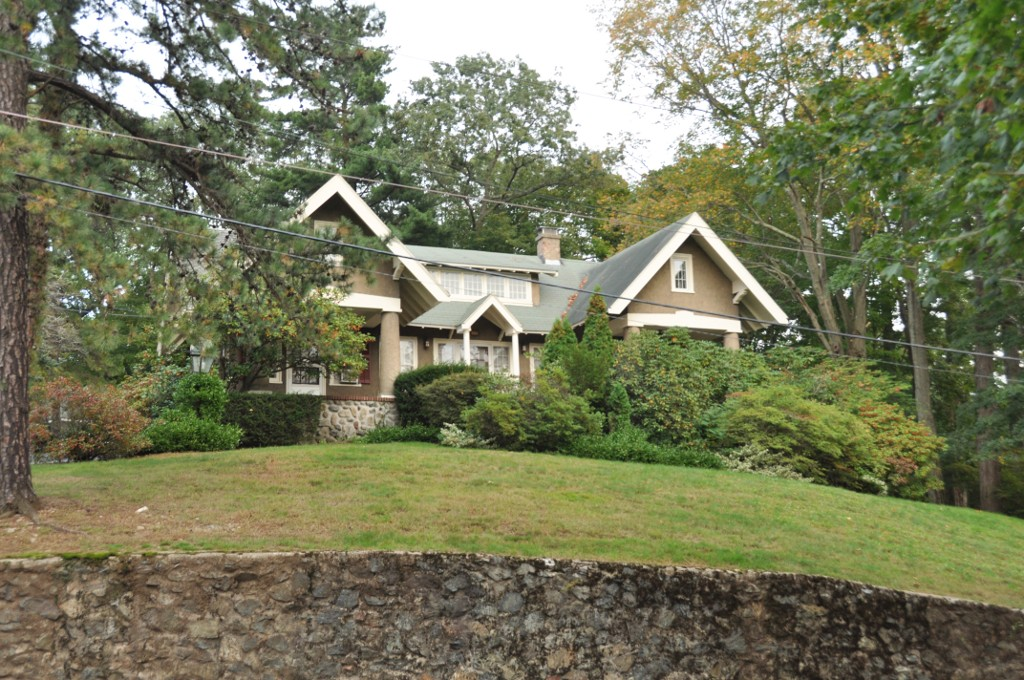

- Location within Massachusetts Location within the United States
- Location: 30 Sheffield Rd., Wakefield, Massachusetts
- Coordinates: 42°30′12.98″N 71°5′23.6″W
- Built: 1917
- Architectural style: Bungalow/Craftsman
- MPS: Wakefield MRA
- NRHP reference No.: 89000733
- Added to NRHP: July 06, 1989

The House at 30 Sheffield Road is one of the more creative early 20th-century Craftsman style houses in Wakefield, Massachusetts. The 1 1/2-story house was built (c. 1916) predominantly of fieldstone and finished in stucco, and was one of the first houses built in the Sheffield Road subdivision. The main body of the house as a gable roof, with two cross-gable sections facing front sheltering porches set on heavy columns. The entry is in the center of the front facade, topped by a small gable end, and with a small pergola in front.

The house was listed on the National Register of Historic Places in 1989.

== See also ==
- National Register of Historic Places listings in Wakefield, Massachusetts
- National Register of Historic Places listings in Middlesex County, Massachusetts
