= House at 8 Park Street =

Historic house in Massachusetts, United States

- U.S. National Register of Historic Places
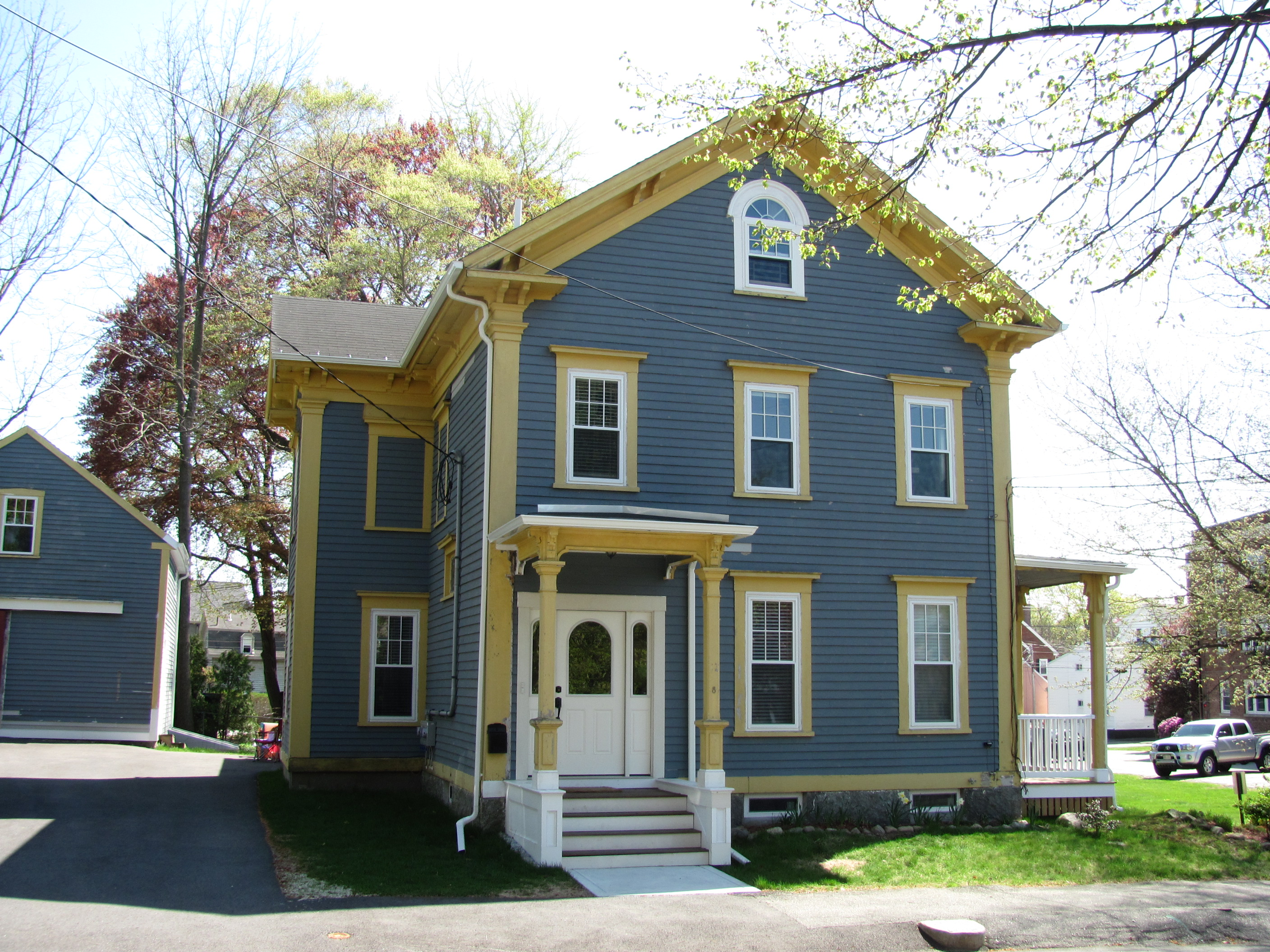

- Location within Massachusetts Location within the United States
- Location: 8 Park St., Wakefield, Massachusetts
- Coordinates: 42°30′23.05″N 71°4′15.17″W
- Built: 1852
- Architectural style: Italianate
- MPS: Wakefield MRA
- NRHP reference No.: 89000689
- Added to NRHP: July 06, 1989

The House at 8 Park Street, also known as the Dr. Joseph Poland House, is a historic house at 8 Park Street in Wakefield, Massachusetts. The 2 1/2-story wood-frame house was built c. 1852 for Dr. Joseph Poland, who only briefly practiced in the town. The house is in a vernacular Italianate style, with a two-story ell on the rear and a porch on the right side. The house has elongated windows with entablatured surrounds. The porch and front portico are supported by turned columns with bracketed tops, the building corners are pilastered, and there are paired brackets found in the eaves and gable ends.

The house was listed on the National Register of Historic Places in 1989.

== See also ==
- National Register of Historic Places listings in Wakefield, Massachusetts
- National Register of Historic Places listings in Middlesex County, Massachusetts
