= H. M. Warren School =

- U.S. National Register of Historic Places
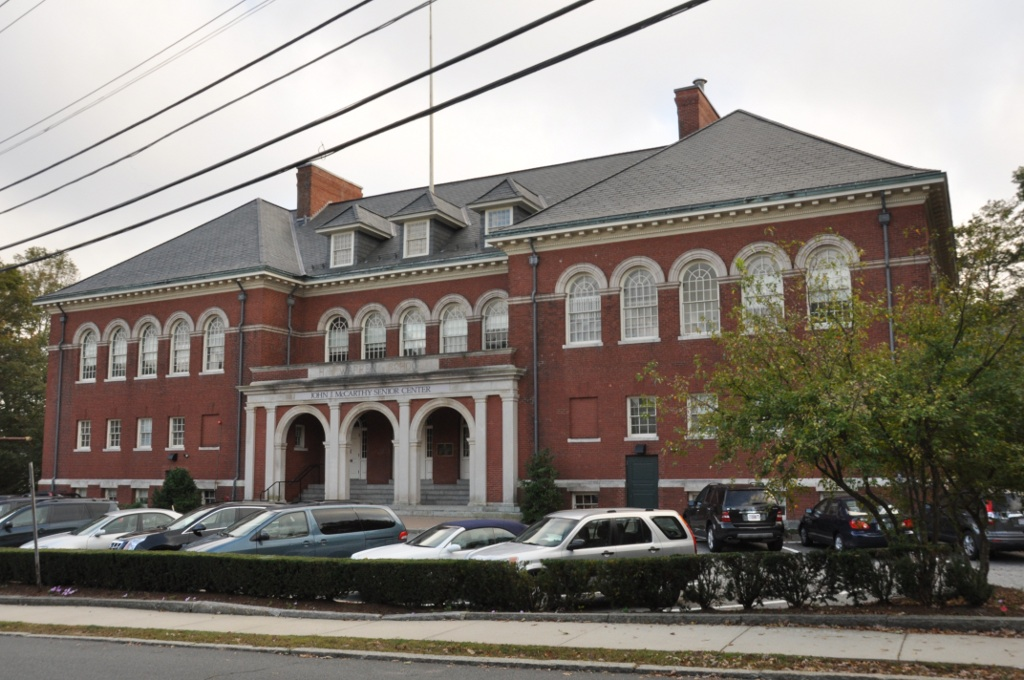

- Location within Massachusetts Location within the United States
- Location: 30 Converse St., Wakefield, Massachusetts
- Coordinates: 42°29′57″N 71°05′04″W
- Area: 1 acre (0.40 ha)
- Built: 1895
- Architect: Park, Charles E.
- Architectural style: Renaissance
- MPS: Wakefield MRA
- NRHP reference No.: 89000750
- Added to NRHP: July 6, 1989

The H. M. Warren School is a historic school building at 30 Converse Street in Wakefield, Massachusetts. Built c. 1895–1897, it is locally significant as a fine example of Renaissance Revival architecture, and for its role in the town's educational system. The building was listed on the National Register of Historic Places in 1989. It now houses social service agencies.

== Description and history ==
The Warren School building is set on the south side of Converse Street, in a residential area on Wakefield's west side. The brick and limestone building was designed by Charles E. Park, and built c. 1895–1897, during the town's most significant period of suburban development (1870–1910). It was named for Major Horace M. Warren, a Wakefield native killed in the American Civil War.

The Renaissance Revival structure is one of the highest quality school buildings built for the town. It is two stories in height, and is built out of brick and limestone with a truncated hip roof. It consists of a central section, which is flanked by matching side sections which project. The side sections are five bays wide, and have hipped slate roofs whose spine runs perpendicular to that of the central section. The central section, where the main entrance is located, has a projecting triple-arched single story portico sheltering stairs to the entry doors. The portico is topped by a low parapet, above which are the second story round-arch windows. Three hip-roof dormers project from the central section's roof. Windows are set in rectangular openings on the ground floor, topped by splayed lintels, while those on the second floor are set in round-arch openings.

== See also ==
- National Register of Historic Places listings in Wakefield, Massachusetts
- National Register of Historic Places listings in Middlesex County, Massachusetts
