= Boardman House =

Boardman House may refer to: (sorted by state, then city/town)

- Boardman House Inn Bed & Breakfast (East Haddam, Connecticut)
- John Boardman House, Boxford, Massachusetts, listed on the National Register of Historic Places (NRHP) in Essex County
- Boardman House (Saugus, Massachusetts), listed on the NRHP in Essex County
- Vinton-Boardman Farmhouse, Southbridge, Massachusetts, listed on the NRHP in Worcester County
- E. Boardman House, Wakefield, Massachusetts, listed on the NRHP in Middlesex County
- Boardman House (Ithaca, New York), listed on the NRHP in Tompkins County
- Boardman–Mitchell House, Staten Island, New York, listed on the NRHP in Richmond County
- Boardman-Webb-Bugg House, Austin, Texas, listed on the NRHP in Travis County
