= Burrage Yale =

Tin ware manufacturer from Wakefield, Massachusetts

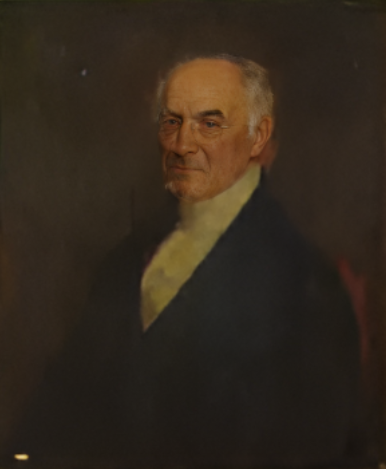
Burrage Yale, Esquire, was among the largest tin ware manufacturers of Massachusetts

Burrage Yale (1781 – 1860) was an American tin ware manufacturer and justice of the peace from Wakefield, Massachusetts. He was the town treasurer and the largest employer in the town. He gave his name to Yale Avenue and Yale Fire Station. He was also the first postmaster recognized in Washington, D. C., and the cofounder of South Reading Academy, with abolitionist minister, Cyrus P. Grosvenor.

His son, Burrage Buchanan Yale, became one of the founders of Lamson, Goodnow & Yale., a major gun-making machine manufacturer for Abraham Lincoln's army during the American Civil War.

== Early life ==
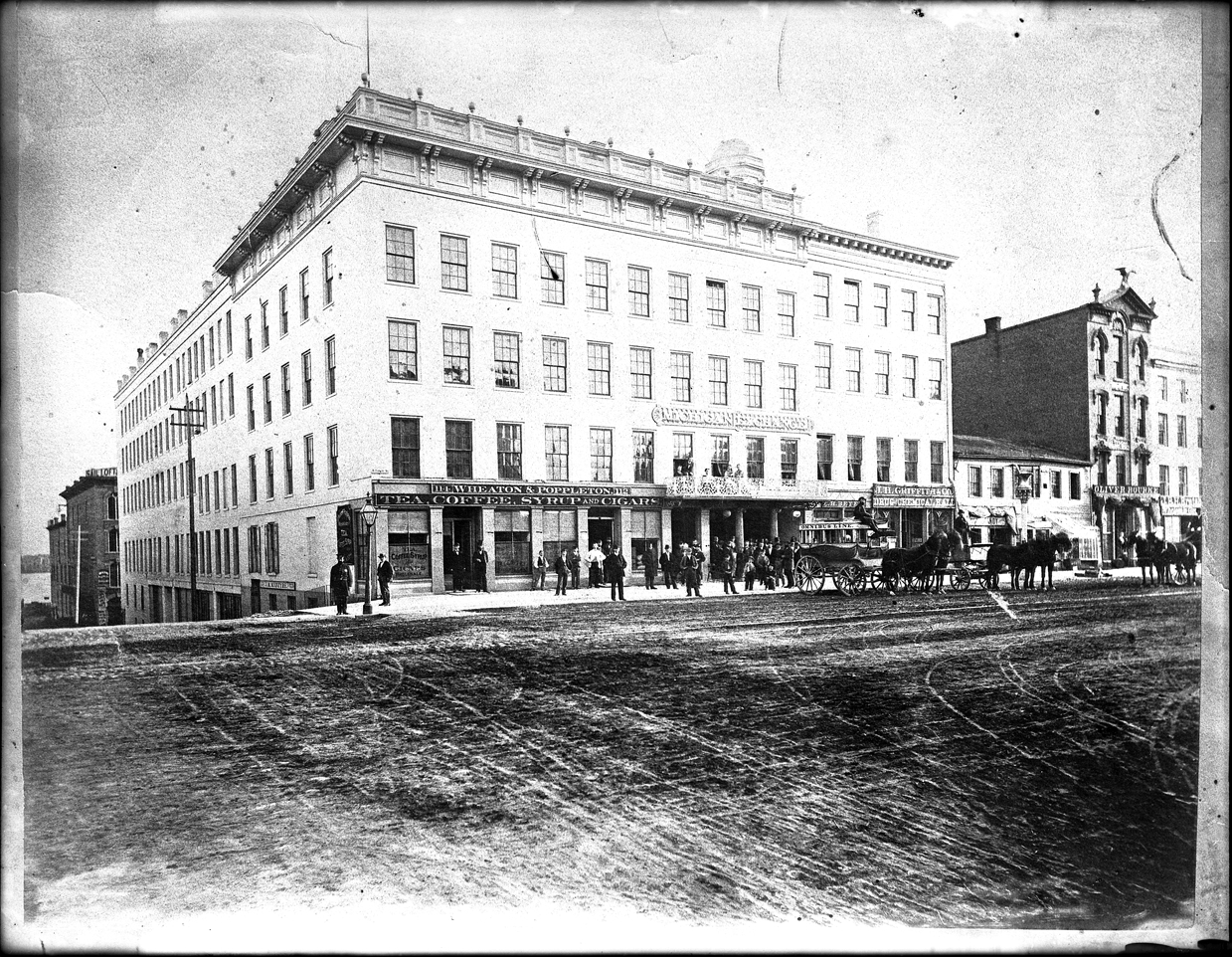
Michigan Exchange Hotel, Detroit, property of Harvey P. Yale's relative, Capt. Lyon

Burrage Yale was born on March 27, 1781, in Meriden, Connecticut, the son of soldier Amerton Yale and Sarah Merriman, members of the Yale family. His father was a member of the 6th Connecticut Regiment under Capt. Hough during the American War of Independence, and was at Tryon's raid in 1779. His grandfather, Nash Yale, was also a soldier of the Revolution.

Yale was a cousin of abolitionist lawyer Barnabas Yale, inventor Linus Yale Sr. of the Yale Lock Company, and of Louisa D. Wilcox, family of millionaire Congressman Chester W. Chapin of Boston. Another cousin, lawyer Harvey P. Yale, was the son-in-law of Senator Truman H. Lyon, brother of Capt. Edward Lyon, proprietor of the Michigan Exchange Hotel in Detroit, Michigan.

Other cousins included Capt. Josiah Yale from the Revolutionary War, and Col. Braddam Yale of the War of 1812. His nephew was Dr. Leroy Milton Yale Jr. of the New York Etching Club. He was distantly related to the Yales of the Britannia ware factories in Yalesville, Connecticut. Members of this branch included merchant William Yale, Gen. Edwin R. Yale and Senator Charles Dwight Yale, among others.

== Biography ==
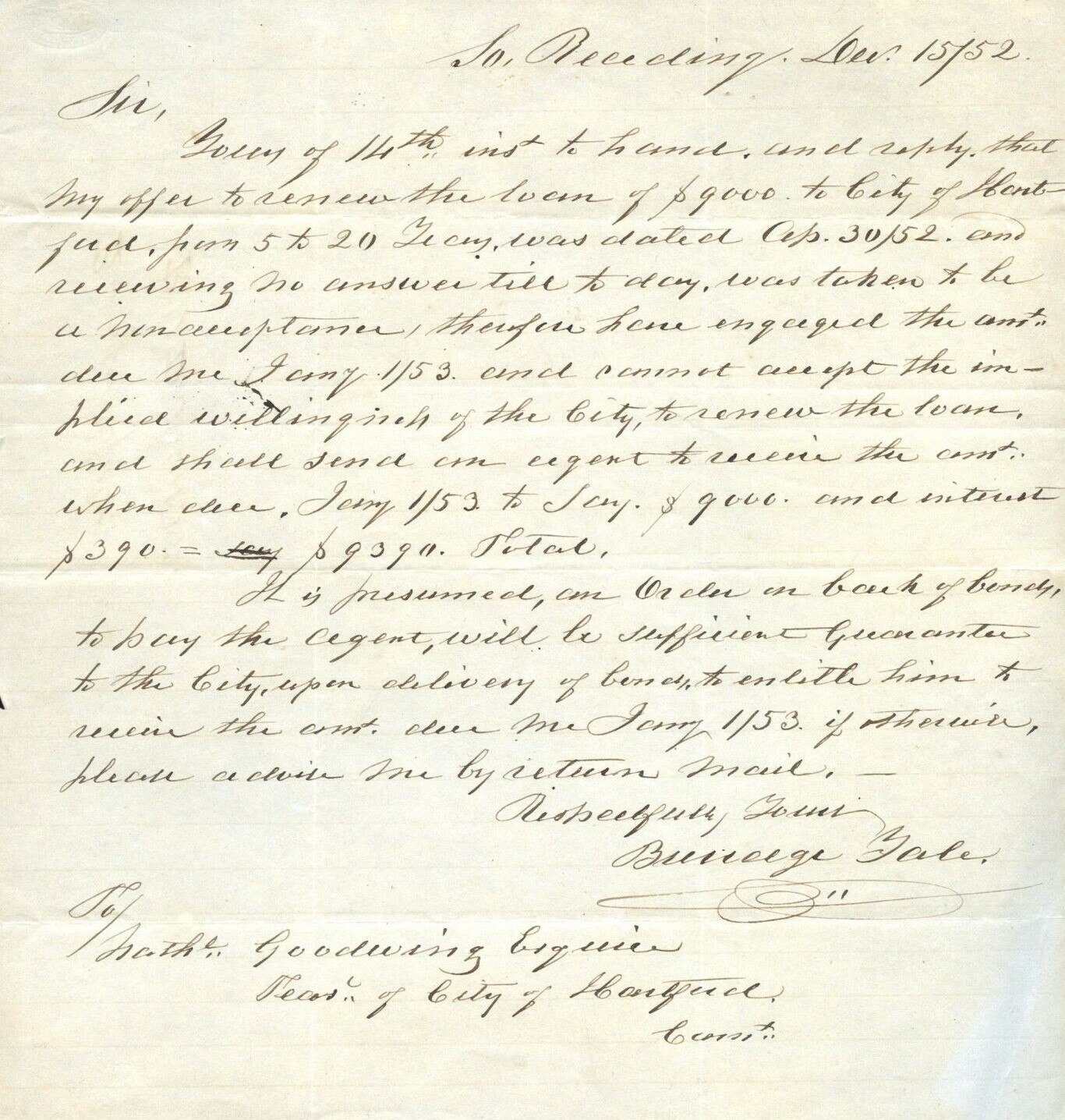
Handwritten letter of Burrage Yale to an employee in 1852

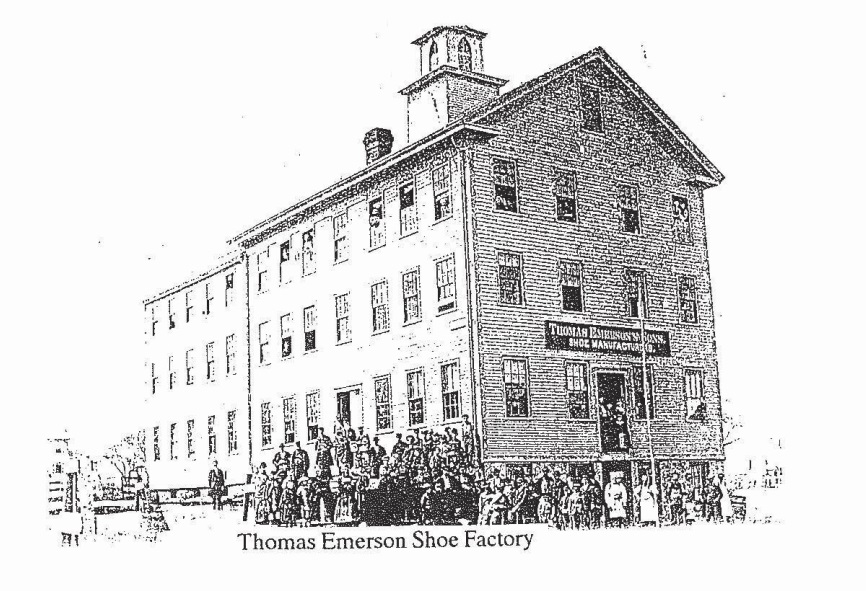
One of Burrage Yale's factories in Wakefield, Massachusetts, became the Thomas Emerson Shoe Factory

Yale started working at an early age, and arrived in Wakefield, Massachusetts, at the time named South Reading, in the early 1800s. He stayed at Col. Boardman's house when he arrived in town, a man who would become his future father-in-law. He started in the tin ware industry as a tin peddler, and thereafter, as a manufacturer in a small shop that he established in 1802.

In 1808, Yale married teacher Sarah S. Boardman, daughter of Colonel Amos Boardman, and became a brother-in-law of sea captain Amos Boardman Jr. and Dr. Moses Long. Their only son, Burrage Buchanan Yale, would marry the daughter of Major Daniel Flint, son of Colonel Daniel Flint Sr., and become a merchant in New York. Buchanan married secondly Mary Macferran, sister of Lieutenant Colonel William K. Macferran of the 52nd Pennsylvania Infantry, part of General George Meade's regiment.

In 1812, at the incorporation of South Reading (Wakefield), Yale was elected as one of its officers, and was nominated on a committee to help the poor and settle other matters. He was on the building committee for the erection of the New Baptist meeting house, and also operated large retail and manufacturing factories in various wares. His pewter factories were operated by Mr. Richardson and Mr. Boardman. He then became a wholesale dealer of tin plates, and a large commodity dealer during the War of 1812 with Britain.

Over time, he made a fortune in his line of business. He tried his way into politics, but ran unsuccessfully for a seat in the Massachusetts House of Representatives. He became Wakefield's town treasurer and justice of the peace for number of years. He was also town moderator. Starting in 1825, Yale opened a tavern named the Burrage Yale Inn, next to his factories in Wakefield, and on March 16, 1827, he became the first postmaster of South Reading, Massachusetts, and the first postmaster to be recognized in Washington, D. C. He kept the office for about 3 years until he let his brother, Eli. A. Yale, a partner in his ventures, take the office.

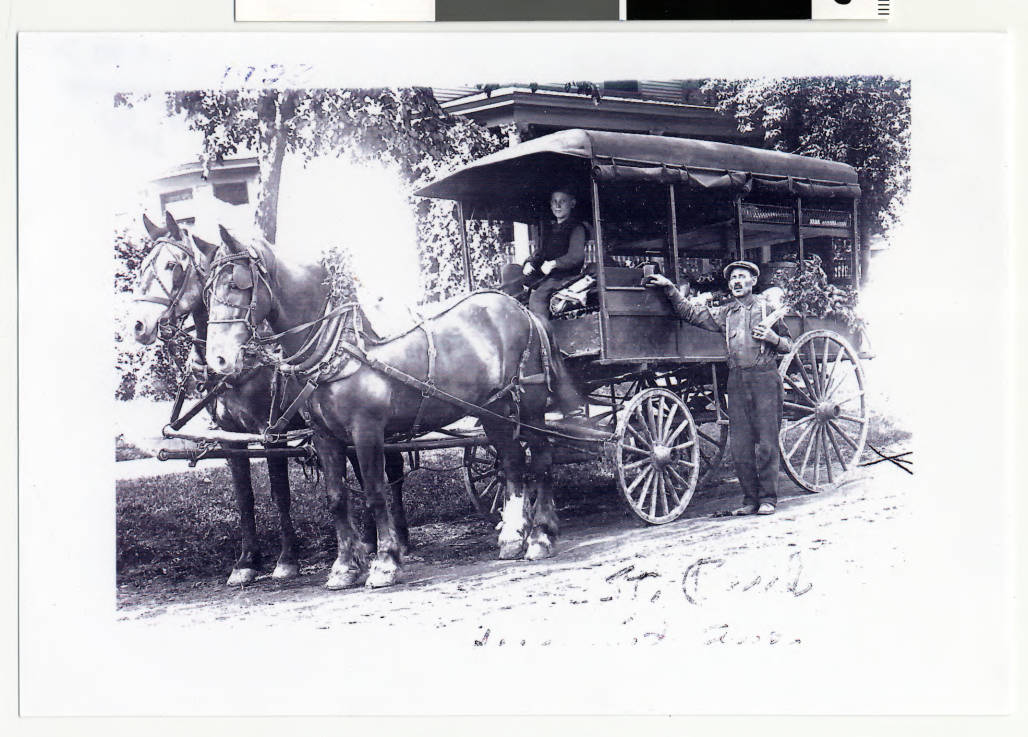
Example of covered wagons used by hundreds of Yale's peddlers, selling tin ware products across New England

In 1828, Yale became one of the founders and founding trustees of South Reading Academy, which was affiliated with Newton Theological Institution, and obtained the approval by Governor Levi Lincoln Jr. and the Senate. Other trustees included Reverend Lucius Bolles, abolitionist minister Cyrus Pitt Grosvenor, college president Rufus Babcock, Reverend Enoch W. Freeman, and a few others.

The school promoted access to higher education to South Reading citizens and taught courses in English and Classics. Over time, the school was discontinued and the land and building were sold to Yale and William Heath, who sold them back to the city in 1847. One of Yale's employees, Francis O. Dewey, became one of the largest glassware manufacturers in New England, and lived at Frank Palmer's house, the past supertintendent of the Boston Merchants Exchange.

Yale was the largest employer in Wakefield in the early 19th century, with most of his fortune coming from his tin ware factories. The basis of his fortune came from the growth of Wakefield from a small village of about 800 individuals at its incorporation, to a thriving suburb of Boston with thousands of citizens. The change came with the creation of the Boston and Maine Railroad, which linked the city to Greater Boston, and gave Yale access to a larger customer base, while manufacturing his products in a lower-cost area.

Yale would hire about 100 peddlers, selling tin ware articles with covered wagons and horses throughout New England, and used his newly acquired wealth to build a large general store in the city, with family members working under him. For his personal affairs, he travelled by horse, as he did not have much trust in railways at the time. In addition to his 100 peddlers across New England, he had employees in his tavern and stores. Yale's businesses expanded over time, forcing him to build new facilities, and he eventually became one of the largest tin ware manufacturers in Massachusetts.

== Death and legacy ==
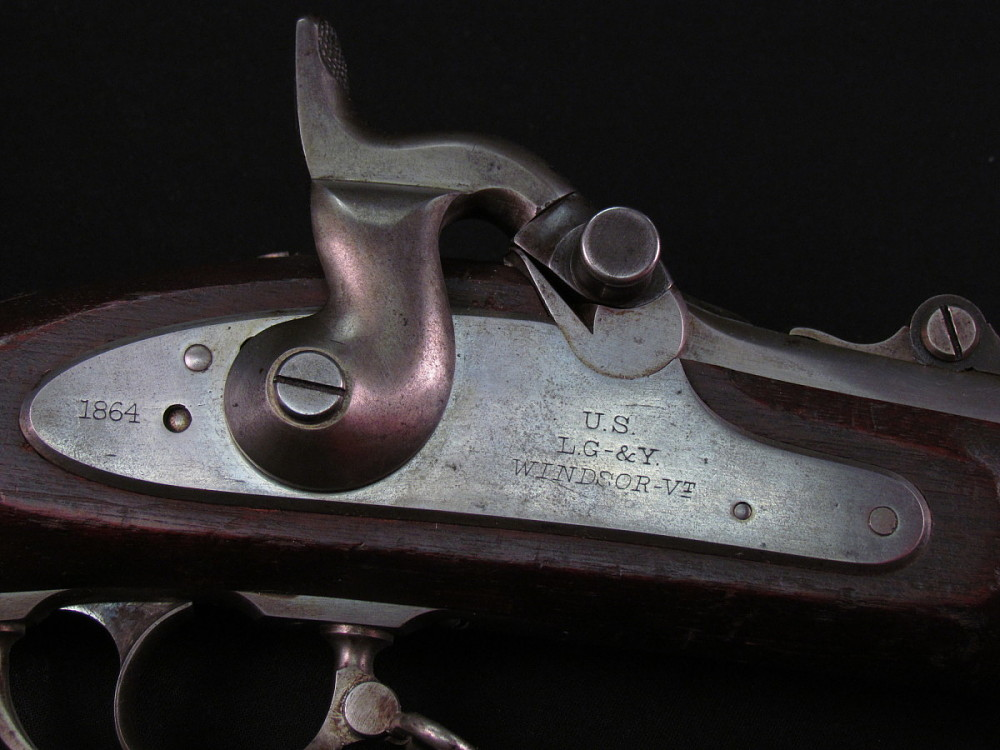
Musket Springfield Model 1861 of Lamson, Goodnow & Yale (L.G & Y.), built in partnership with Samuel Colt

Yale gave his name to Wakefield's fire department, named the Yale Engine House, or the Yale Fire Station, which he erected, and his former estate became the Yale Avenue Historic District. They acquired a William Jeffers hand-drawn tub, at a cost of about $1500 in 1852. It was named the Yale No. 1 in recognition of Yale's gift to the city, and the fire department was approved by the Massachusetts General Court to be the fire agency of Wakefield.

It would remain the only fire engine house in the city until the American Civil War. Burrage Yale's Inn and the Yale Engine House are now both demolished. Number of luxurious homes would be built on his former estate on Yale Avenue by Boston businessmen. The next largest manufacturer in town was Cyrus Wakefield, who gave his name to the city, and became an early investor in The Boston Globe.

Yale died on September 5, 1860, at 79 years old. One of his daughters, Sarah A. Yale, married Dartmouth's graduate, William Heath, pastor of South Reading Academy. His two other daughters, Lucilia T. and Octavia A., married Reverend Nathan Monroe and Reverend George P. Smith.

After the death of his first wife, Yale married Miss Richardson, and then, Mary Carter Coolidge, widow of Colonel Benjamin F. Baldwin, son of Colonel Loammi Baldwin, father of American civil engineering. Baldwin's brothers were prominent engineers in Boston, involved with Harvard and the railroads, and were named Loammi Baldwin Jr., James F. Baldwin, George R. Baldwin and Cyrus Baldwin. Sarah's uncle was builder Elis Boardman of Elias Boardman House. Through Yale's third marriage with Mrs. Coolidge, he became the step-grandfather of Dr. Roswell Park, founder of Roswell Park Comprehensive Cancer Center.

Yale's only son, Burrage Buchanan Yale, co-founded with Ebenezer G. Lamson the gun manufacturer Lamson, Goodnow & Yale. The company had a major impact on the American Civil War, and was behind most of the 2 million weapons manufactured to the Union Army of Abraham Lincoln, mainly through their conversions of industrial factories into gun-making manufacturers. They also obtained special government contracts from the Lincoln administration, manufacturing muskets under their own brand, such as the Springfield Model 1861, in partnership with Samuel Colt, and dealing with Lincoln's Secretaries of War, Simon Cameron and Edwin Stanton.

== Gallery ==
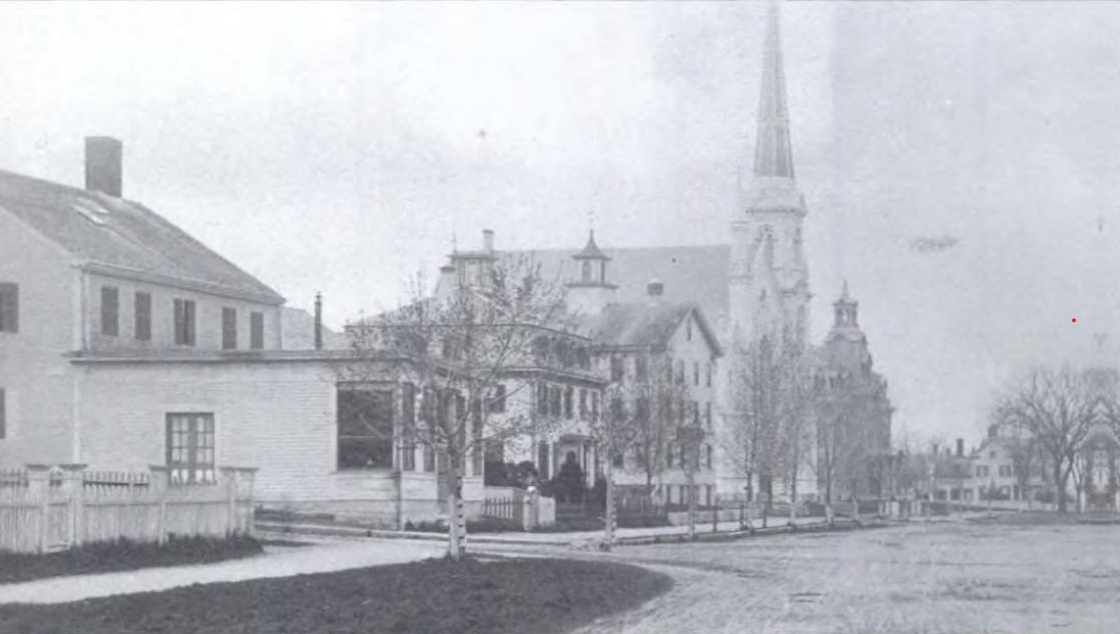
Burrage Yale Mansion and Yale's tin ware shop, c. 1880s

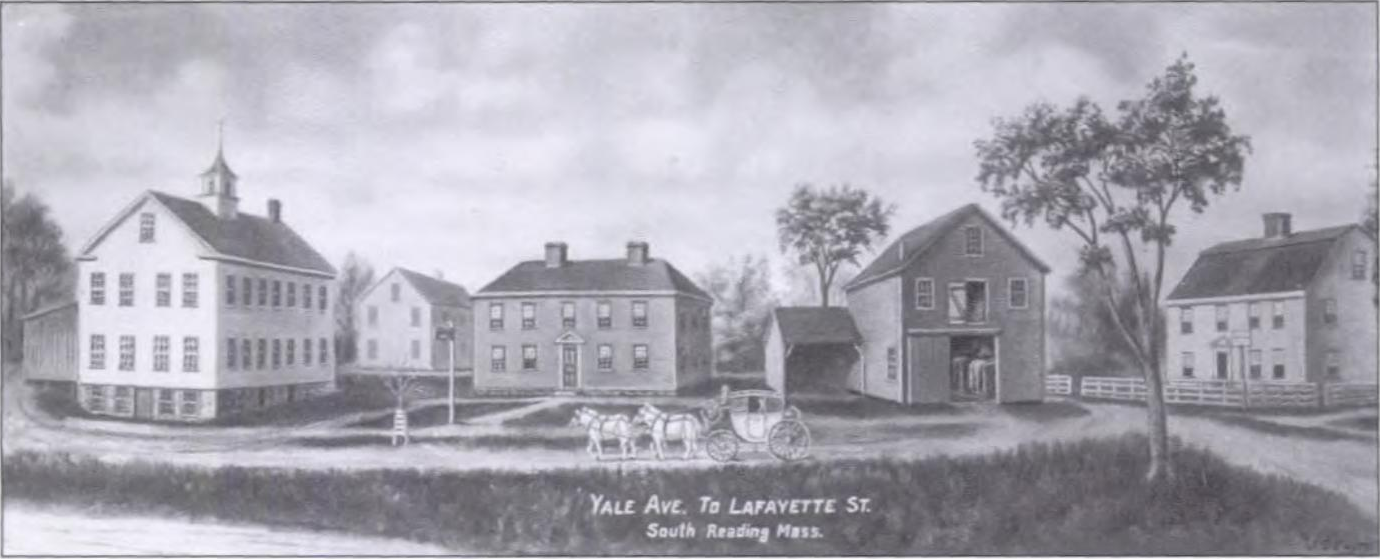
Yale Avenue to Lafayette Street, Yale's shop on the left, 1850s

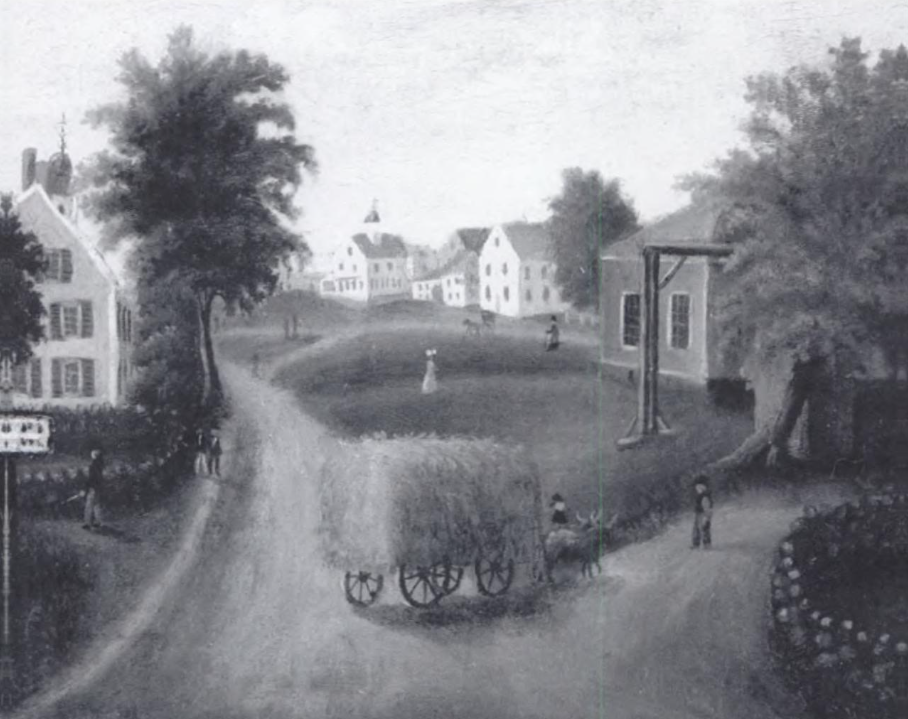
Burrage Yale tin shop in the distance, 1840

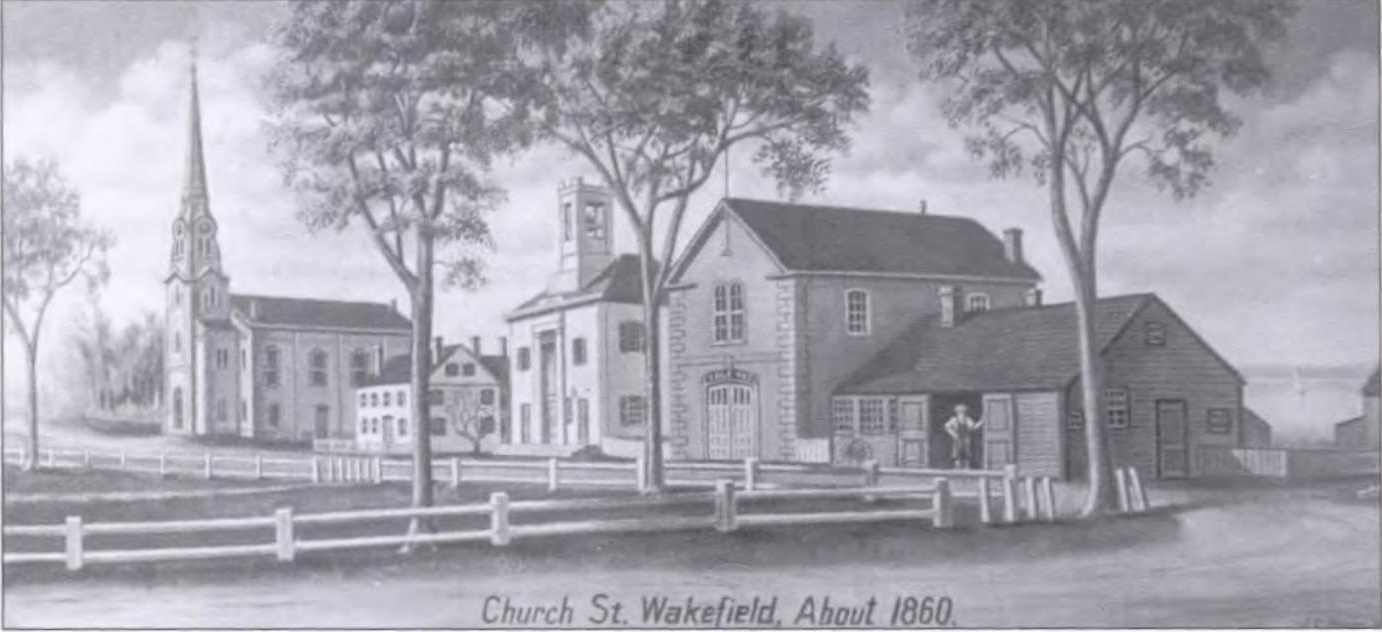
Yale Engine House on the right before the shop, c. 1860

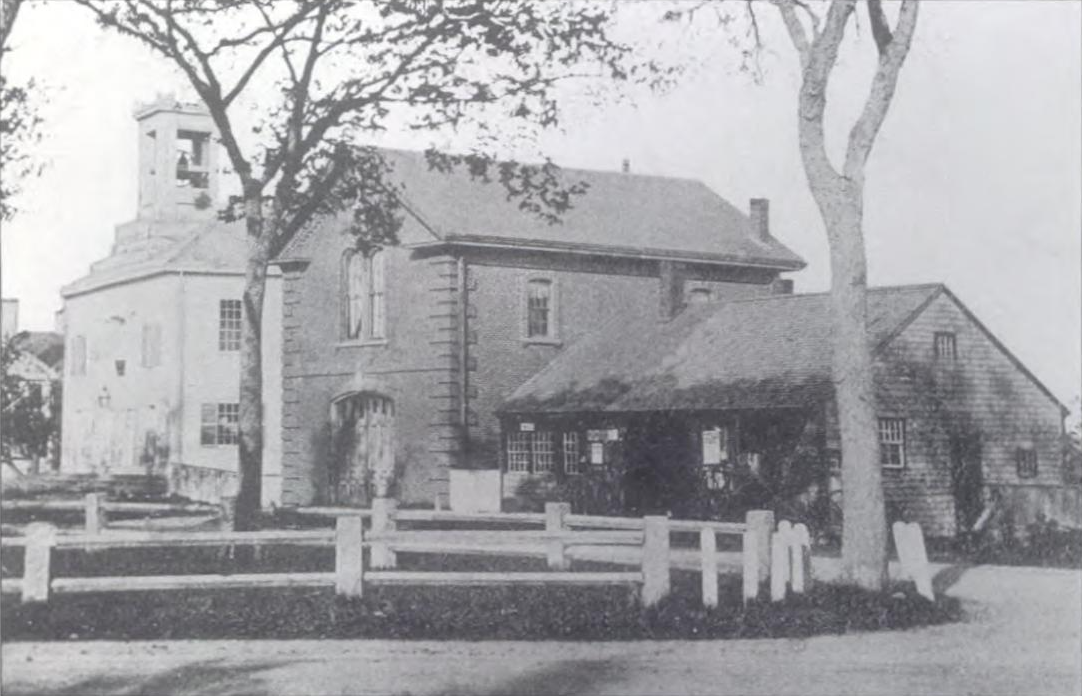
Yale Engine House, c. 1850

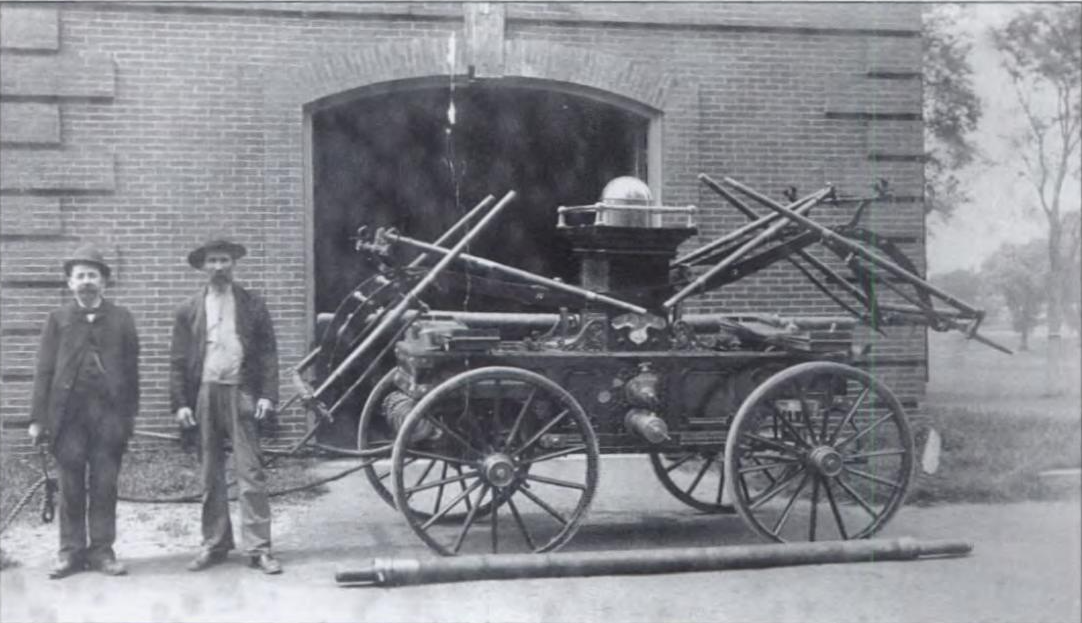
Yale No. 1, hand fire engine, c. 1871
