= Church–Lafayette Streets Historic District =

Historic district in Massachusetts, United States

- U.S. National Register of Historic Places
- U.S. Historic district
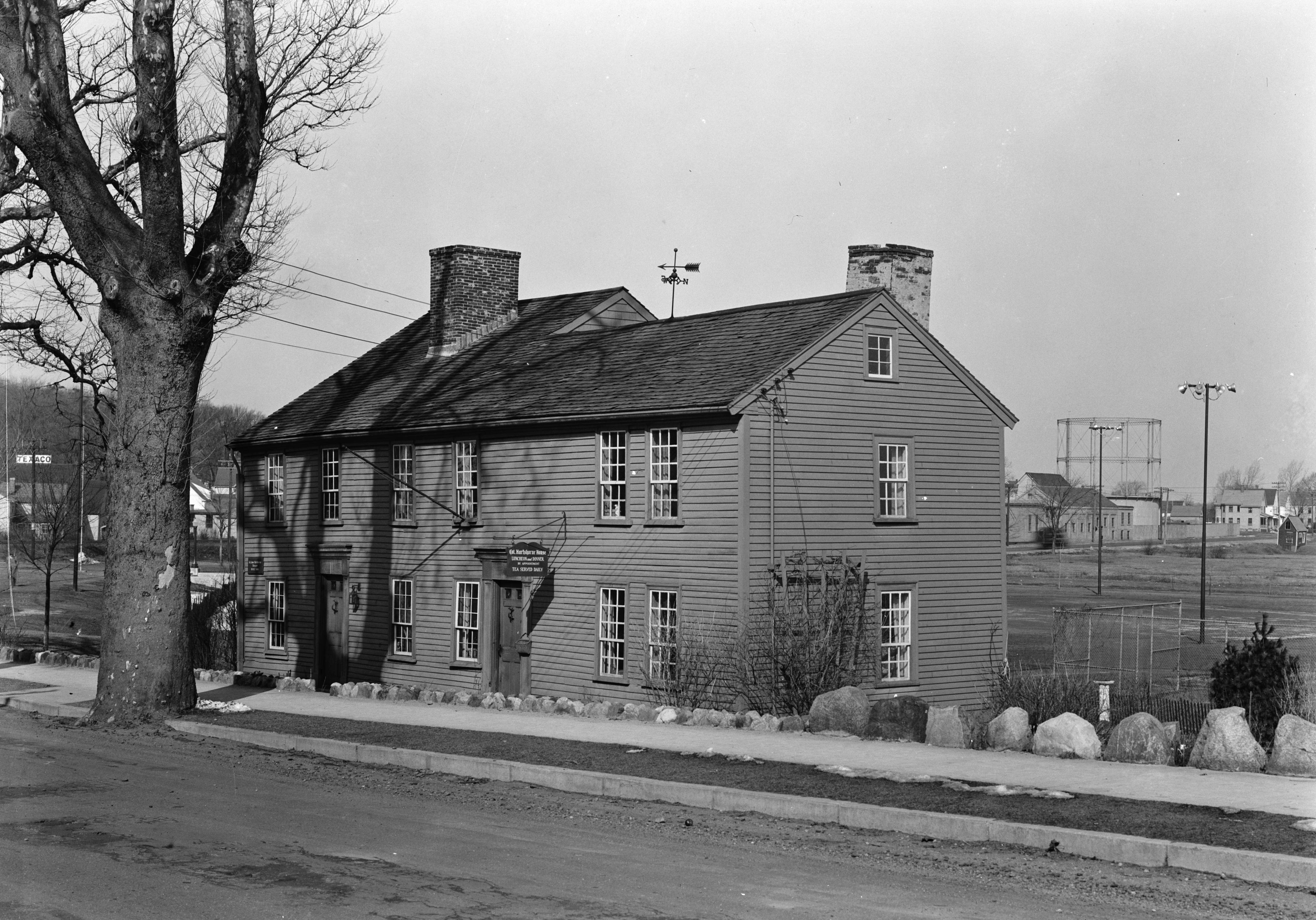
- The Colonel James Hartshorne House, a contributing property in the district

- Location within Massachusetts Location within the United States
- Location: Roughly Church St. from Lafayette St. to North Ave., Wakefield, Massachusetts
- Coordinates: 42°30′20.31″N 71°4′37.58″W
- Area: 7 acres (2.8 ha)
- Architectural style: Greek Revival, Federal
- MPS: Wakefield MRA
- NRHP reference No.: 89000757
- Added to NRHP: July 6, 1989

The Church–Lafayette Streets Historic District encompasses a well-preserved collection of late 18th- and early 19th-century houses in Wakefield, Massachusetts. It includes properties on Church Street between Common Street and North Avenue, and on Lafayette Street between Common and Church Streets. The district was added to the National Register of Historic Places in 1989.

== Layout and design ==
Church Street, which is immediately south of Lake Quannapowitt, was laid out in the late 17th century, but only had a single house from that period survive, the c. 1681 Hartshorne House at 41 Church Street. The Hartshorne House was remodeled in the Federal period of the late 18th/early 19th century, when many of the houses on Church Street were built. The houses at 40, 42, and 44 Church Street were originally built to the same basic plan (three bays wide and four deep), although #42 was later widened to the more typical five bay appearance. 38 Church Street is distinctive in Wakefield for having brick side walls.

Lafayette Street was laid out in 1824, and most of its houses are Greek Revival in character. The house at 34 Lafayette Street (c. 1835) has a high-style porch with fluted columns, and an elaborate Greek Revival entry with sidelights and fully surrounding architrave. 28 Lafayette (c. 1834) also has a doorway with sidelights, but it is flanked by pilasters. Across the street stands 23 Lafayette (c. 1834), which stands with its gable end to the street, unlike the other two, where the gable has a pedimental appearance made to look like stone.

== See also ==
- Common District (Wakefield, Massachusetts), adjacent to the east
- Yale Avenue Historic District, adjacent to the south
- National Register of Historic Places listings in Wakefield, Massachusetts
- National Register of Historic Places listings in Middlesex County, Massachusetts
