= Yale Avenue Historic District =

Historic district in Massachusetts, United States

- U.S. National Register of Historic Places
- U.S. Historic district
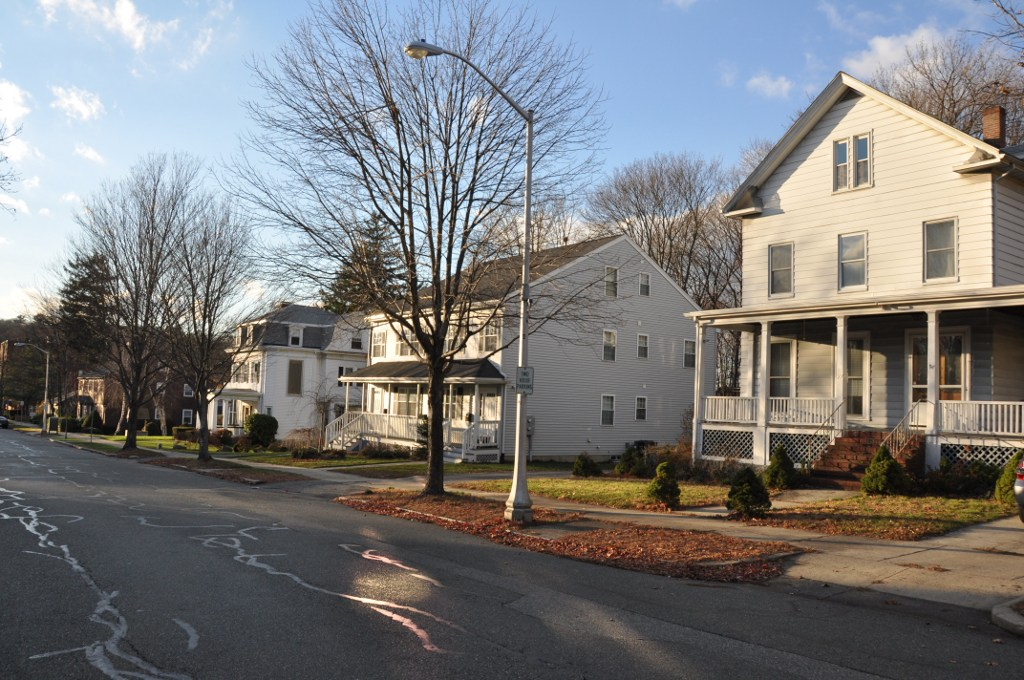

- Location within Massachusetts Location within the United States
- Location: 16-25 Yale Ave., Wakefield, Massachusetts
- Coordinates: 42°30′17.52″N 71°4′24.44″W
- Area: 2 acres (0.81 ha)
- Architectural style: Late Victorian
- MPS: Wakefield MRA
- NRHP reference No.: 89000756
- Added to NRHP: July 06, 1989

The Yale Avenue Historic District is a residential historic district near the center of Wakefield, Massachusetts. It encompasses eight residential properties, all but one of which were developed in the 1860s and 1870s, after the arrival of the railroad in town. These properties were built primarily for Boston businessmen, and mark the start of Wakefield's transition to a suburb.

The district, which was listed on the National Register of Historic Places in 1989, consists of five houses (16-24) on the south side of Yale Street, and three (21-25) directly opposite on the north side. Five are Italianate in style, one is Second Empire, one is Queen Anne, and the newest house in the district, 22 Yale Avenue, was built c. 1896 in the Colonial Revival Style. All are 2 1/2 stories in height, and of wood-frame construction, with clapboards and/or shingles on their exteriors, and most have porches.

Although the houses are nominally in one style, most exhibit features that are reminiscent of a different style. The house at 20 Yale Avenue, for instance, follows a somewhat typical Italianate L-shaped plan, but its porch is more elaborately decorated with what might be considered Queen Anne features. The house at 23 Yale Avenue, built c. 1863, marks a shift from the Italianate to the Second Empire with the addition of a mansard-style roof with fish scale shingles. 24 Yale Avenue is one of t Wakefield's few surviving Stick style houses, and 22 Yale Avenue is an early and modest example of the Colonial Revival.

Yale Avenue was named after businessman Burrage Yale, Wakefield's largest manufacturer during the earlhy 19th century.

== See also ==
- Common District (Wakefield, Massachusetts), adjacent to the east
- Church-Lafayette Streets Historic District, adjacent to the north
- National Register of Historic Places listings in Wakefield, Massachusetts
- National Register of Historic Places listings in Middlesex County, Massachusetts
