= United States Post Office–Wakefield Main =

- U.S. National Register of Historic Places
- U.S. Historic district – Contributing property
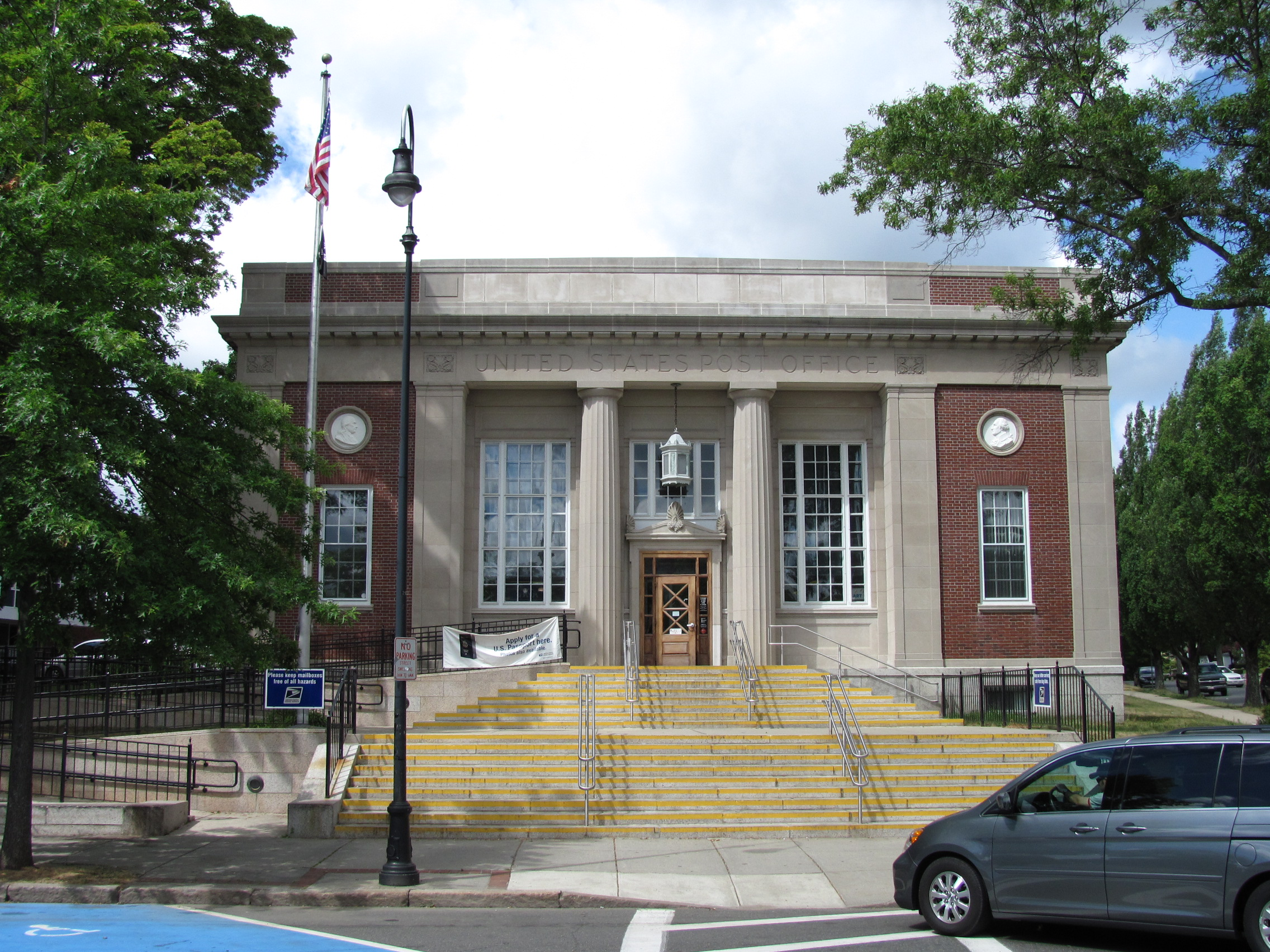
- Main Post Office

- Location within Massachusetts Location within the United States
- Location: 321 Main St., Wakefield, Massachusetts
- Coordinates: 42°30′17.7″N 71°4′19.2″W
- Built: 1936
- Architect: Bridge, Edward M.; Long, A.J., Construction Co.
- Architectural style: Classical Revival
- Part of: Common District (ID89000754)
- NRHP reference No.: 86003439

Significant dates
- Added to NRHP: October 19, 1987
- Designated CP: March 2, 1990

The United States Post Office–Wakefield Main is a historic post office building at 321 Main Street in Wakefield, Massachusetts. Built in 1936 as part of a Depression-era works project, it is a Classical Revival structure that harmonizes with its neighbors. The building was listed on the National Register of Historic Places in 1987, and included in the Common District in 1990.

== Description and history ==
The Wakefield Post Office is set on the west side of Main Street, at the southwest corner with Yale Avenue. A single-story Classical Revival brick and limestone building, it stands between two other Classical Revival buildings, the former YMCA, and the Lucius Beebe Memorial Library. Its front facade is five bays wide, the center three recessed behind a pair of fluted Doric columns and flanking square pillars, which are also found at the building corners. The pillars support a stone entablature, above which is a parapet obscuring the building's flat roof. The outer bays each have a large sash window, above which are circular panels with decorative plaques, giving the building a hint of the then-popular Art Moderne style.

Wakefield's first post office was in the private home of its postmaster, David Norcross, at Main and Chestnut Streets. In 1860, after a series of moves occasioned by the change of postmaster, it was located in commercial spaces in the downtown. The current structure was built by the federal government as a Depression-era works project, which including hiring a local architect, Edward M. Bridge, to design it.

== See also ==
- National Register of Historic Places listings in Wakefield, Massachusetts
- National Register of Historic Places listings in Middlesex County, Massachusetts
- List of United States post offices
