= American Precision Museum =

- Robbins and Lawrence Armory and Machine Shop
- U.S. National Register of Historic Places
- U.S. National Historic Landmark
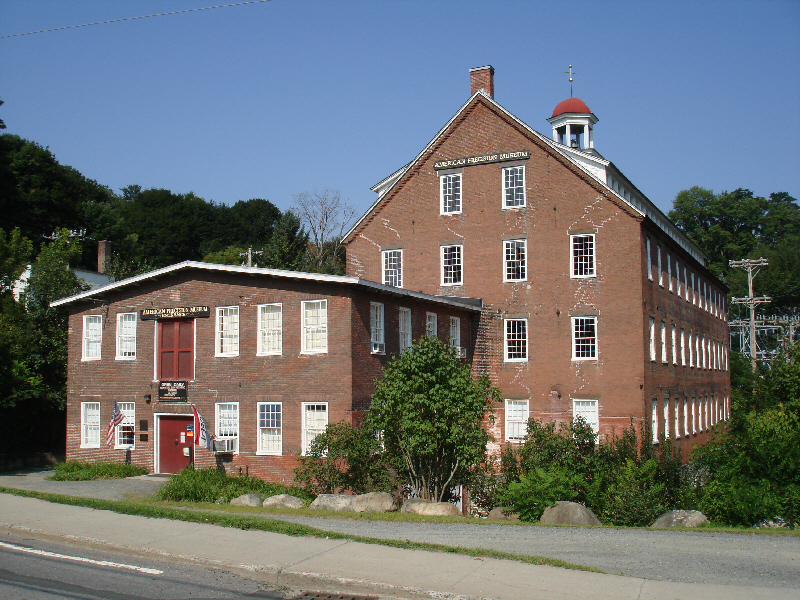
- The American Precision Museum

- Location within Vermont Location within the United States
- Location: S. Main St., Windsor, Vermont
- Coordinates: 43°28′29″N 72°23′23″W
- Area: 1.75 acres (0.71 ha)
- Built: 1846
- NRHP reference No.: 66000796

Significant dates
- Added to NRHP: November 13, 1966
- Designated NHL: November 13, 1966

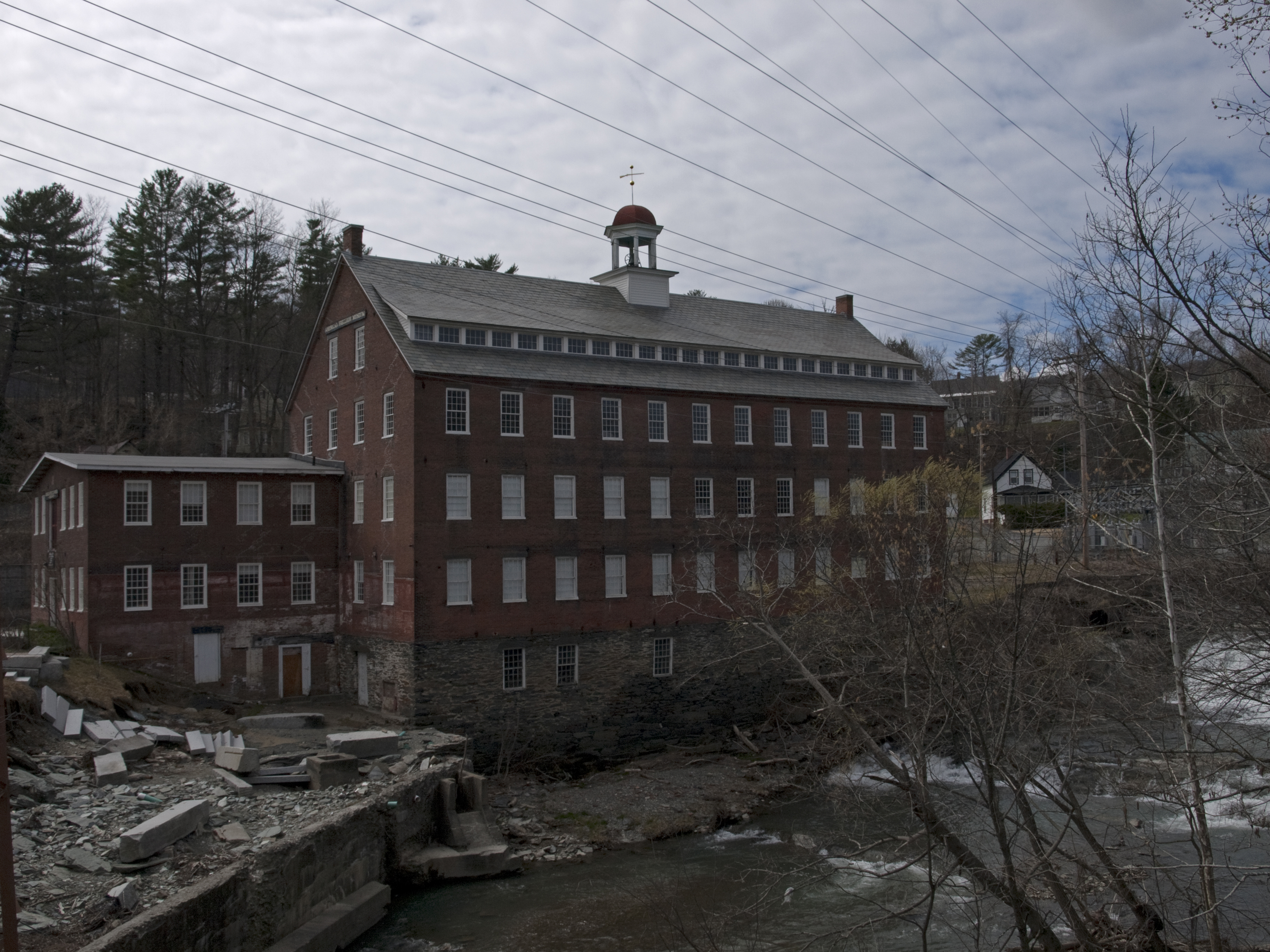
Robbins Workshop Windsor

The village and factories of Robbins & Lawrence Armory

The American Precision Museum is located in the renovated 1846 Robbins & Lawrence factory on South Main Street in Windsor, Vermont. The building is said to be the first U.S. factory at which precision interchangeable parts were made, giving birth to the precision machine tool industry. In recognition of this history, the building was declared a National Historic Landmark in 1966. In 1987, the building was recognized by the American Society of Mechanical Engineers as an International Heritage Site, and the collection was recognized as an International Heritage Collection. For each of these designations, the armory was considered a site where pivotal events occurred in the history of American industry, as well as a place that lends itself to comprehensive interpretation of that history.

A "machine tool" is a machine which makes parts to other machines, such as screws or gun stocks. Lathes, milling machines, and drill presses are examples of precision machine tools. The museum has the largest collection of historically significant machine tools in the United States. The museum's holdings include a collection of industrial machinery spanning the first one hundred years of precision manufacturing, along with fine examples of early machined products including rifles, sewing machines, and typewriters. Photographs and archival records provide additional resources for interpreting this critical phase of the Industrial Revolution.

== History of the building ==
=== Robbins and Lawrence Armory ===
Richard S. Lawrence, a brilliant mechanic, moved to Windsor in 1838 at age 21 and started making guns in the Windsor Prison. He joined Nicanor Kendall, who had a gun-making shop, and together started a new company. Four years later businessman Samuel E. Robbins came to Windsor. In 1846, Samuel Robbins, Nicanor Kendall, and Richard Lawrence took the bold step of bidding on a government contract for 10,000 rifles.

Having won the contract, they then constructed a four-story brick building beside Mill Brook. Over the next eight years, the factory was built and machines to make precision parts were made. They brought in workers and mechanics, invented new machines, adapted old ones, and perfected techniques for producing interchangeable parts. Later, Lawrence bought out Kendall. Within a few years, they were exporting not only rifles but also their new metal cutting machines across North America, to England and around the world. The technology for making guns was quickly adapted to making consumer products as well as parts for many other machines

The imposing, four-story structure rises from a stone foundation adjacent to a brook that provided immediate and efficient use of waterpower. Inside, power was distributed throughout each floor with line shafting; the shafts were connected to individual machines by leather belts. Abundant windows and the building's narrow width relative to its length (40’ x 100’), brought daylight into the interior work areas. Outside, the immediate neighborhood is still home to worker housing that was built at various times in the factory's history. The nearby Connecticut River and the active railroad attest to the importance of transportation in the development of the site.

Conjectural Belting Diagram (Building Cutaway)

Isometric View

1846 -1853 Evolution of Building

1884-2009 Evolution of Building

=== The Armory Building: 1866–1964 ===
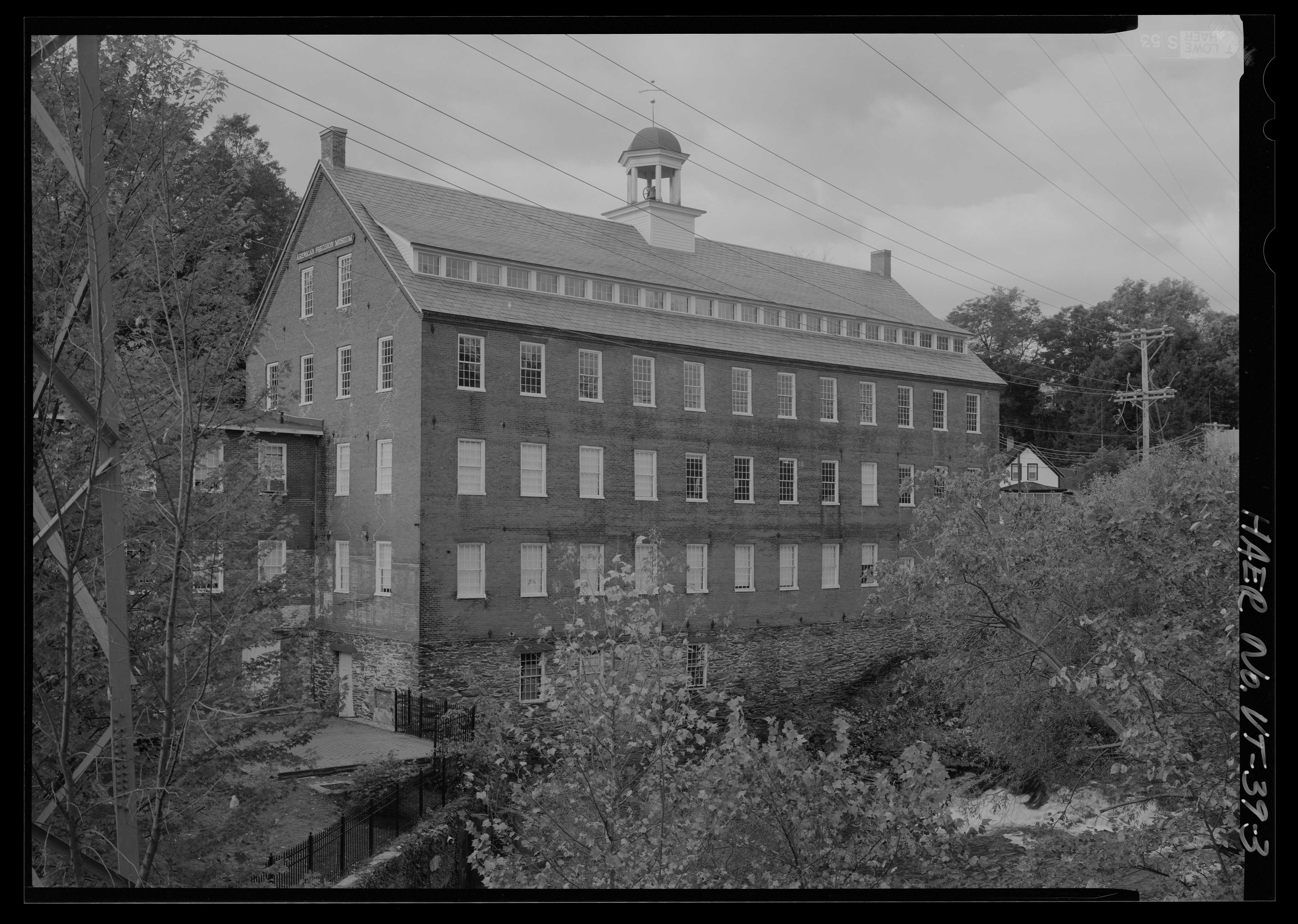
North elevation of museum looking southwest, Robbins & Lawrence Armory

The building operated as a cotton mill beginning in 1866 for nearly two decades, before returning to manufacturing machine tools in 1888. Ten years later the property was sold to the Windsor Electric Light Company, before being sold to the Central Vermont Public Service Company in 1926.

=== The Museum: 1966 - Present ===
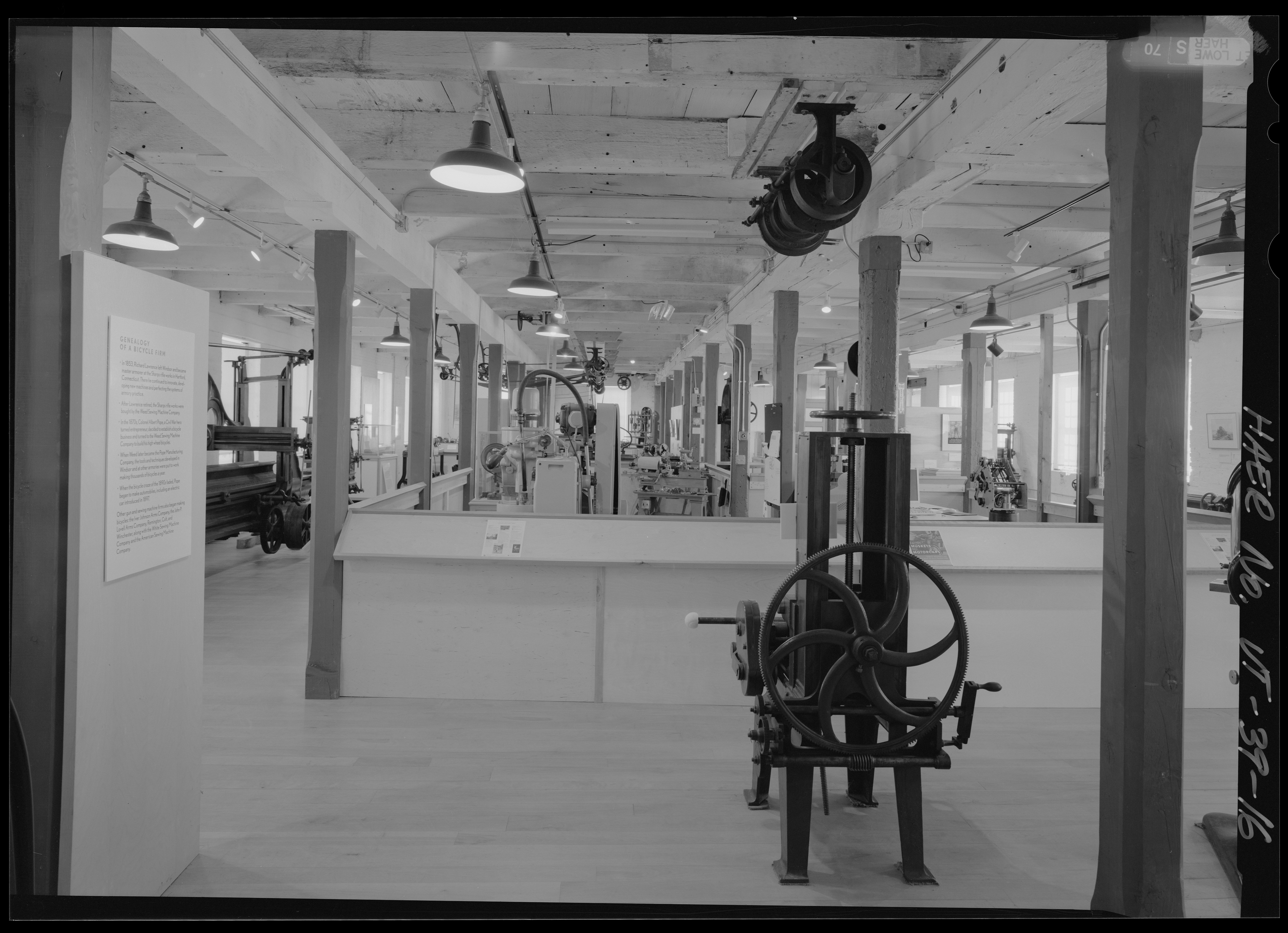
First floor of museum, west end, looking east at machinery exhibits

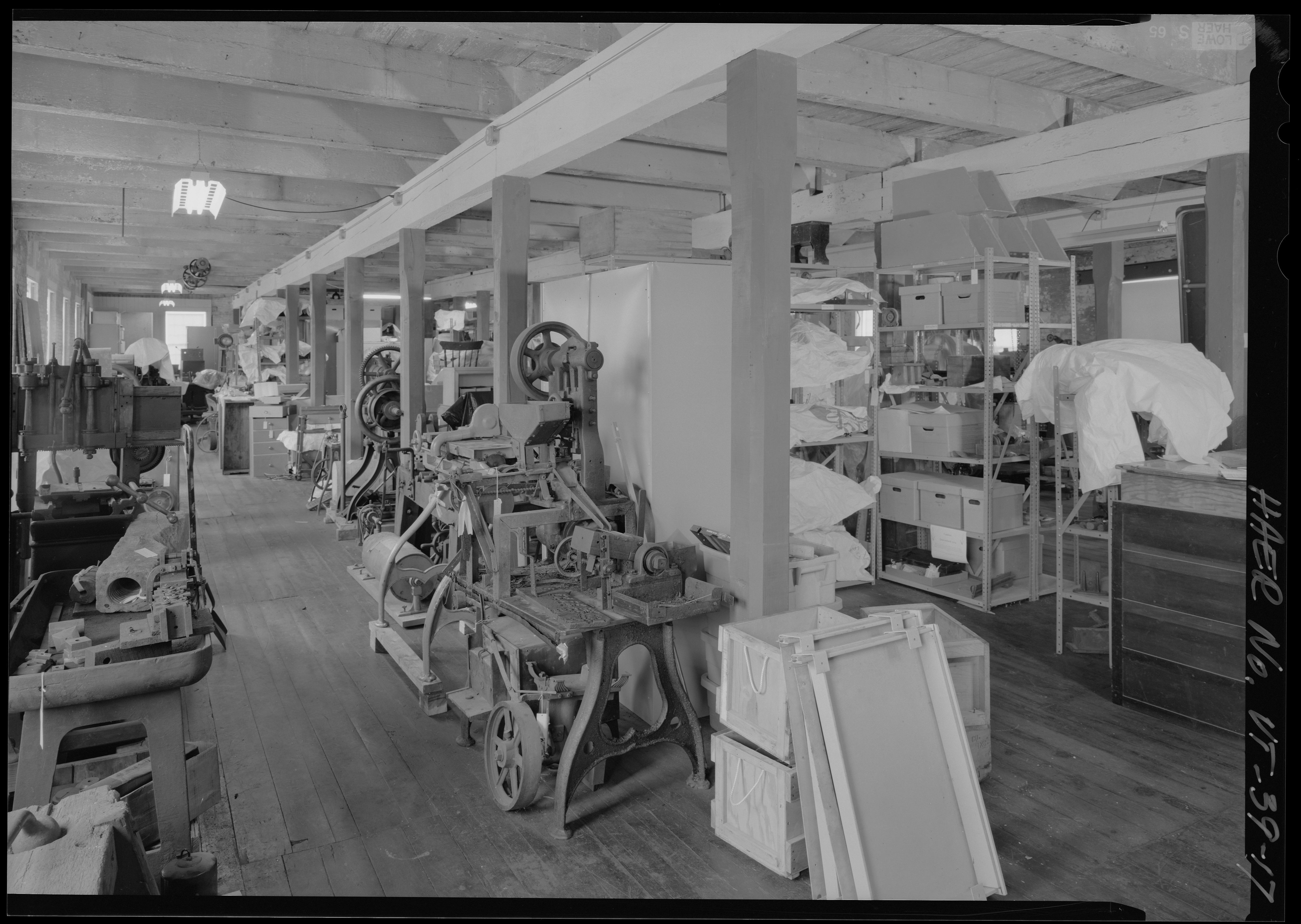
Second floor of museum, currently used for storage, looking east

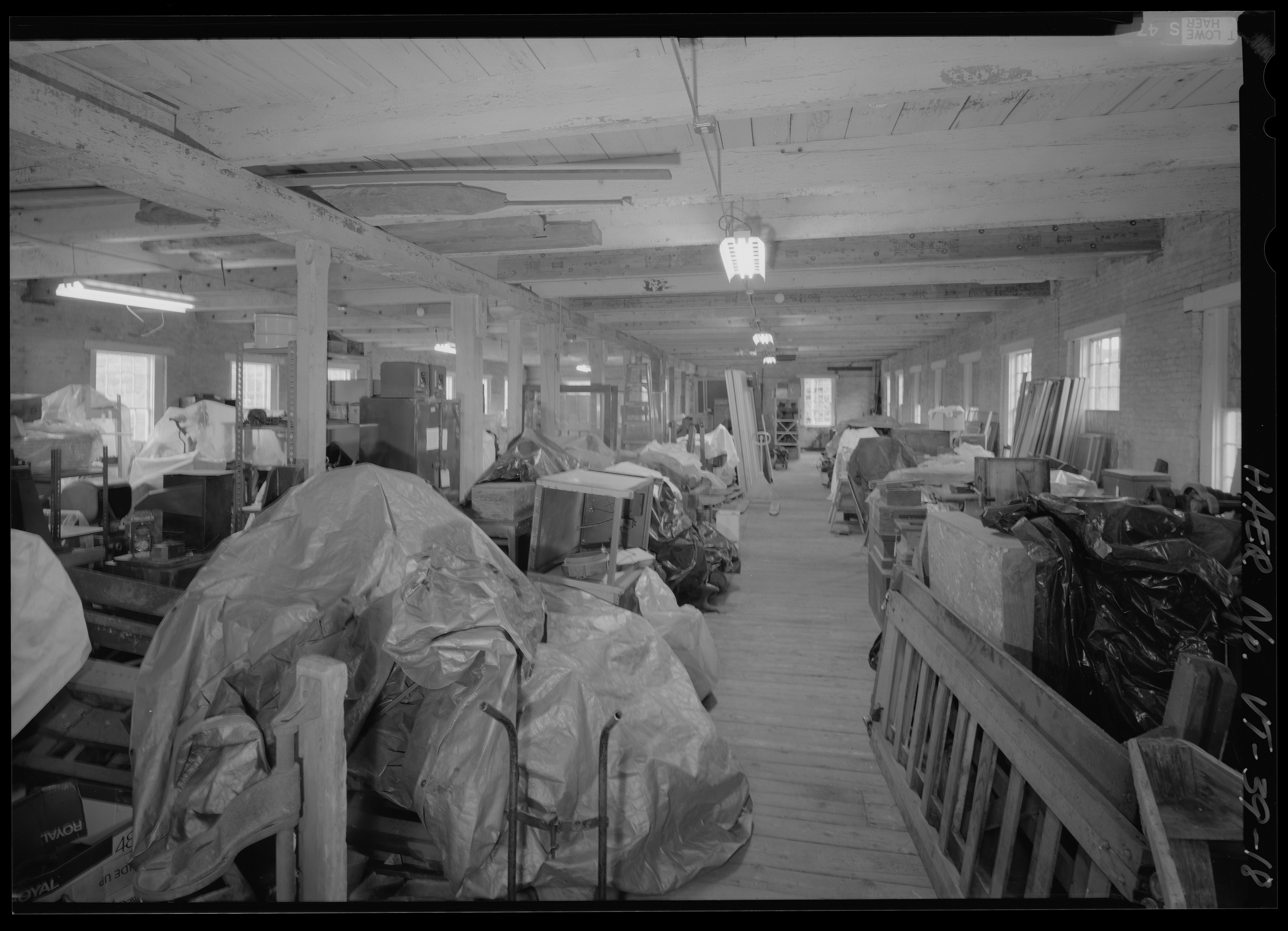
Third floor of museum, also used for storage, looking east

In 1964, CVPS proposed razing the building, prompting Smithsonian curator and Windsor resident, Edwin A. Battison to formulate plans for the creation of a museum. Battison had a relationship with CVPS, storing various items in the building since the 1950s.

Windsor native Battison founded the American Precision Museum in 1966 and served as its director until 1991. Battison, a curator of Mechanical Engineering at the National Museum of American History at the Smithsonian Institution, secured the Robbins & Lawrence Armory to house the museum and the collection of historic machine tools, related books, and archival materials he had collected during his lifetime.

The armory building is significant for its architectural integrity, which reflects the size, scale, and operation of a 19th-century factory. A National Historic Landmark, in 2001 it was designated a special project of Save America’s Treasures; in 2003, APM received a Save America’s Treasures award of $200,000 for installing a new slate roof to replace the deteriorated original.

== Legacy of Robbins and Lawrence ==
=== Early Manufacturing and the “American System” ===
The first phase of the Industrial Revolution was introduced in America during the late 18th century and was modeled on the English system of textile manufacturing. In 1846, when the Armory was built, the second phase of the Industrial Revolution—the “American System”—was about to be launched. In the remote village of Windsor, entrepreneurs and artisans had already constructed a series of dams that powered sawmills and a gristmill on the Mill Brook, 18 buildings and shops in total. In these small workshops, inventors developed designs for new products as well as making both new and old items more quickly. In Windsor and other towns up and down the Connecticut River Valley (known as the Precision Valley), new industries attracted more people and stimulated the creation of commercial downtowns. Mills, stores, and homes were clustered between the river and the steep hillsides.

=== Robbins & Lawrence Impact ===
There are two reasons that Robbins & Lawrence can be considered as founders of the precision tool industry. In 1851, Robbins and Lawrence traveled to London to demonstrate their rifles at the Great Exhibition, held in London's Crystal Palace. The rifles were made in Windsor using interchangeable parts. They won a medal and so impressed the British Army that they placed an order for 25,000 rifles for the Crimean War and also ordered 141 of the Robbins & Lawrence metal-working machines making the firm the first large-scale exporter of machine tools.

The second reason Robbins & Lawrence can be credited with the birth of the precision tool industry is the number of people who were employed at the factory that went on to work at, or found, other companies. J.W. Roe produced a "Genealogy of the Robbins & Lawrence Shop" which is reproduced here, with permission, from Lindsay Publications. With the development of interchangeable parts, machines of all sorts could be made in large numbers and sold more cheaply. The manufacture of sewing machines, typewriters, bicycles, engines and cars soon followed. Precision machine tools which makes standardized parts make the mechanical equipment of our modern world.

=== Windsor, Vermont and Precision Manufacturing ===
Windsor, Vermont played an important role in the development of precision manufacturing and the machine tool industry in America. The Robbins & Lawrence armory served as a breeding ground for innovation in the mid-19th century and as a center for excellence in the high tech industry of its day. Military leaders and industrialists traveled to Windsor to learn about the new “American System” of manufacturing, and workers from Windsor were aggressively recruited by other emerging industries. By continually increasing productivity, the machine tool industry spread the notion that material abundance was possible for a broad cross section of the American people. At its full maturity in the mid 20th century, the machine tool industry provided the backbone of American industrial strength and helped the United States develop into a world power.

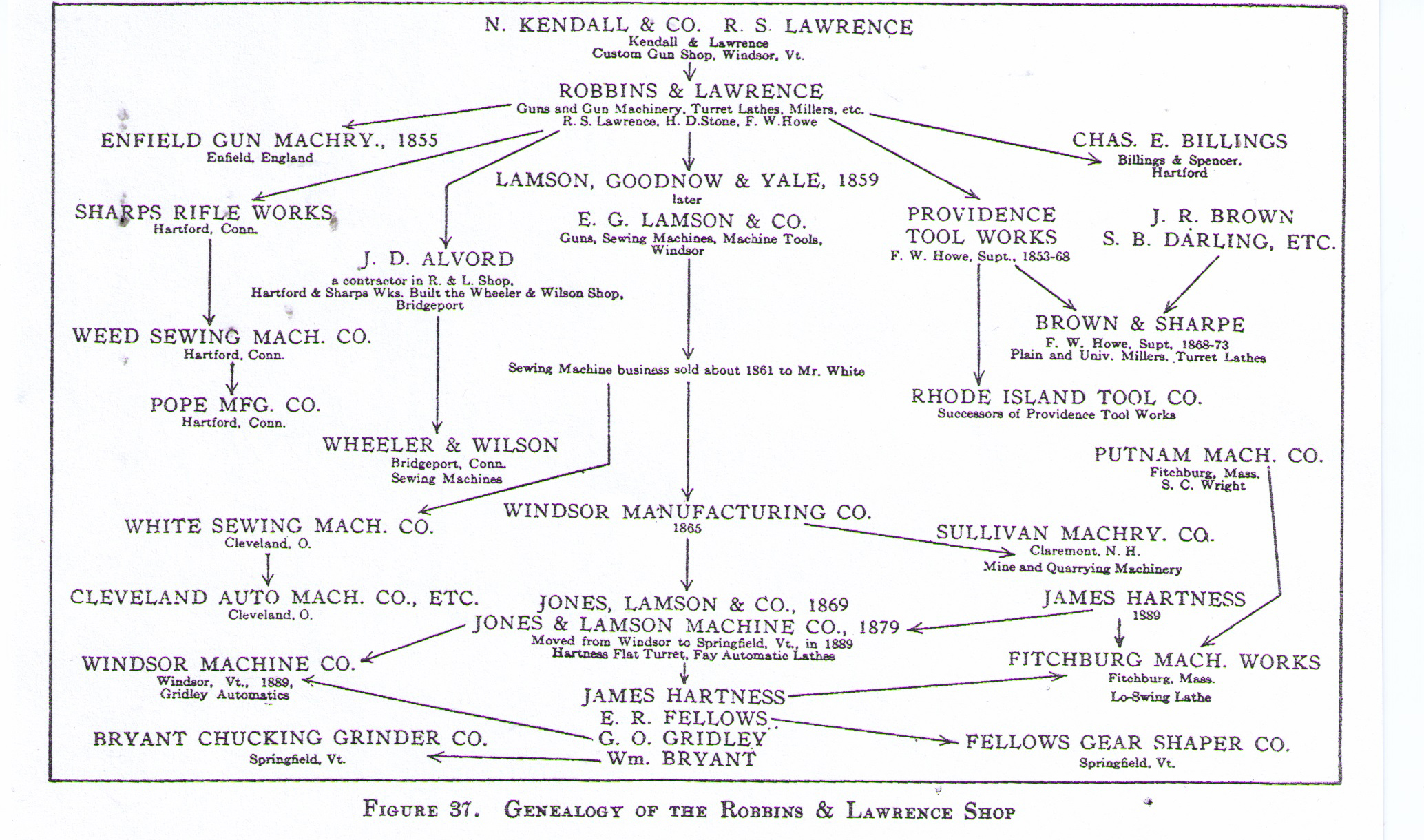
Genealogy of Robbins & Lawrence

== Past exhibits ==
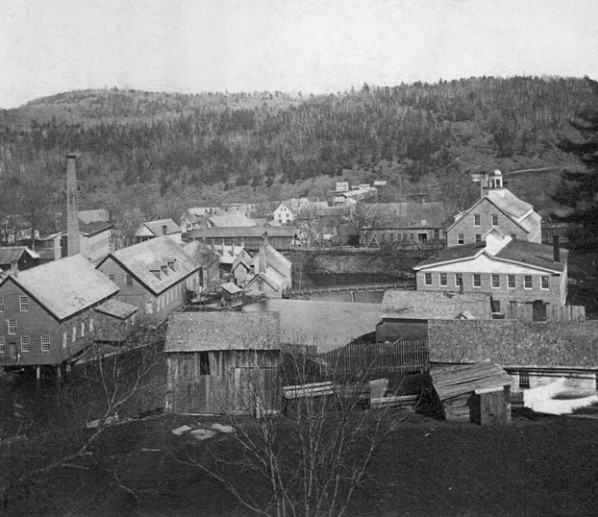
The armory complex in Windsor during the Civil War, of Lamson, Goodnow & Yale

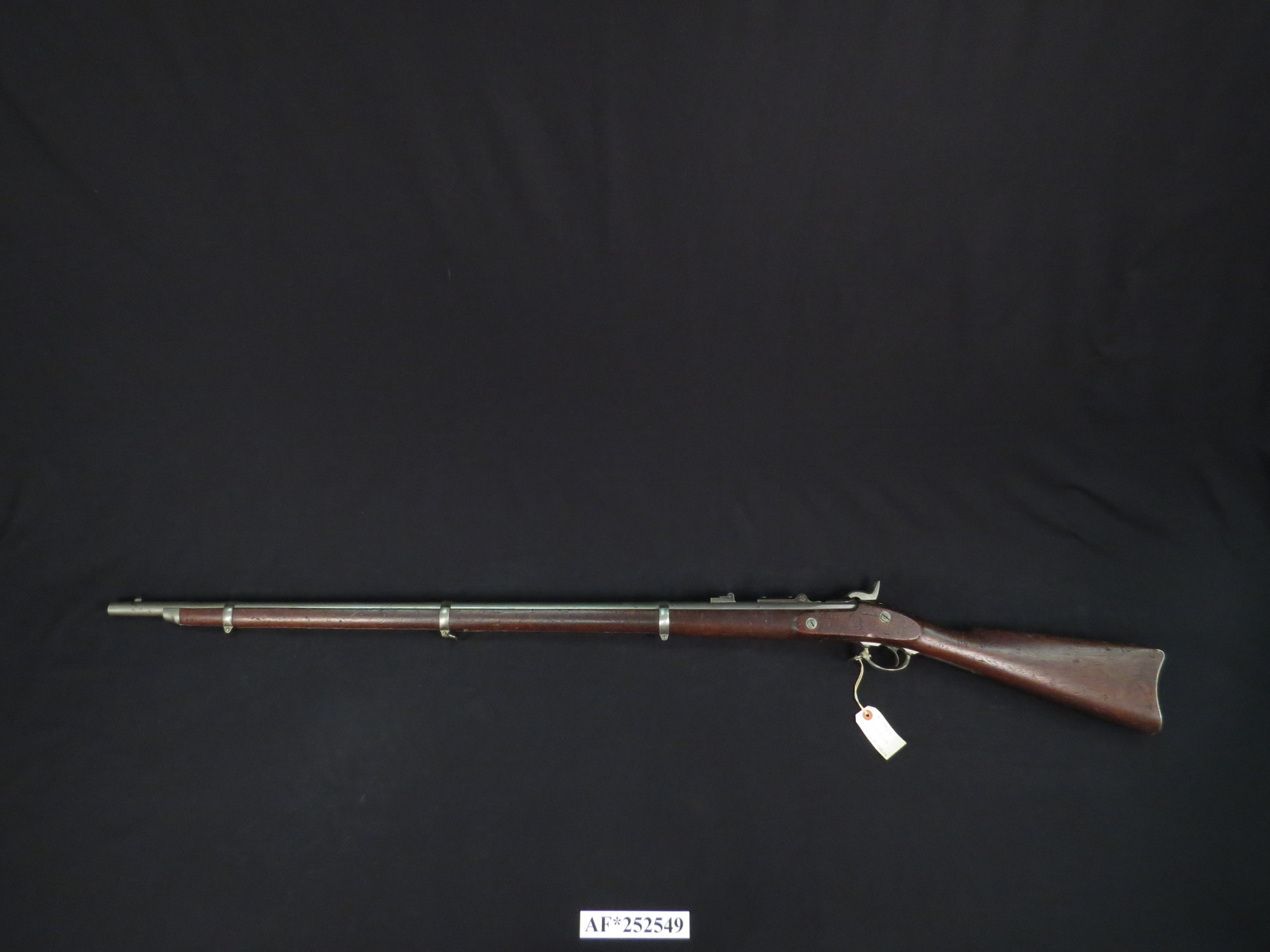
Lamson, Goodnow & Yale, Springfield Model 1861, built in 1864, special model during the American Civil War

- 1995: Maxfield Parrish: Machinist, Artisan, Artist. Mr. Battison's friendship with the artist's son Maxfield Parrish Jr.. had helped bring to the museum a number of interesting artifacts and photographs which represented the life and interests of the artist After the death of the younger Mr. Parrish in 1983. his widow, Helen Parrish, continued the family's generosity and donated to the museum additional Parrish materials. In 1985, the museum received another group of Parrish materials from Mrs. Alma Gilbert. on behalf of the Maxfield Parrish Museum, which had been operating across the river in Plainfield, New Hampshire, but was closing that year.
- 1997: Pedal Power: The Bicycle in Industry and Society
- 1999: Carriage Wheels to Cadillac's: Henry Leland and the Quest for Precision
- 2004: Building for Invention
- 2006: The Cutting Edge: Machines that Shaped Our World
- 2007: Doodles, Drafts, and Designs: Industrial Drawings from the Smithsonian
- 2007: Windsor Post-Pastoral: The Changing Landscape of the Birthplace of Vermont
- 2008-2011: From Muskets to Motorcars: Yankee Ingenuity and the Road to Mass Production
- 2010: Waterwheel and Millwork Drawings
- 2011: John Aschauer
- 2012- 2014: The Civil War Sesquicentennial at the American Precision Museum: In 2012, the museum opened two new exhibitions commemorating the 150th anniversary of the U.S. Civil War.
  - Full Duty: The Civil War Collection of Howard Coffin presents the first-ever exhibition from the private collection of Vermont's foremost Civil War historian and author. Featuring letters, diaries, photographs, maps, paintings, and newspapers, the exhibition explores the day-to-day life of Vermont soldiers in camp and on the battlefield. These artifacts and images explore how the actions and decisions of ordinary people can have an enormous impact on historic events.

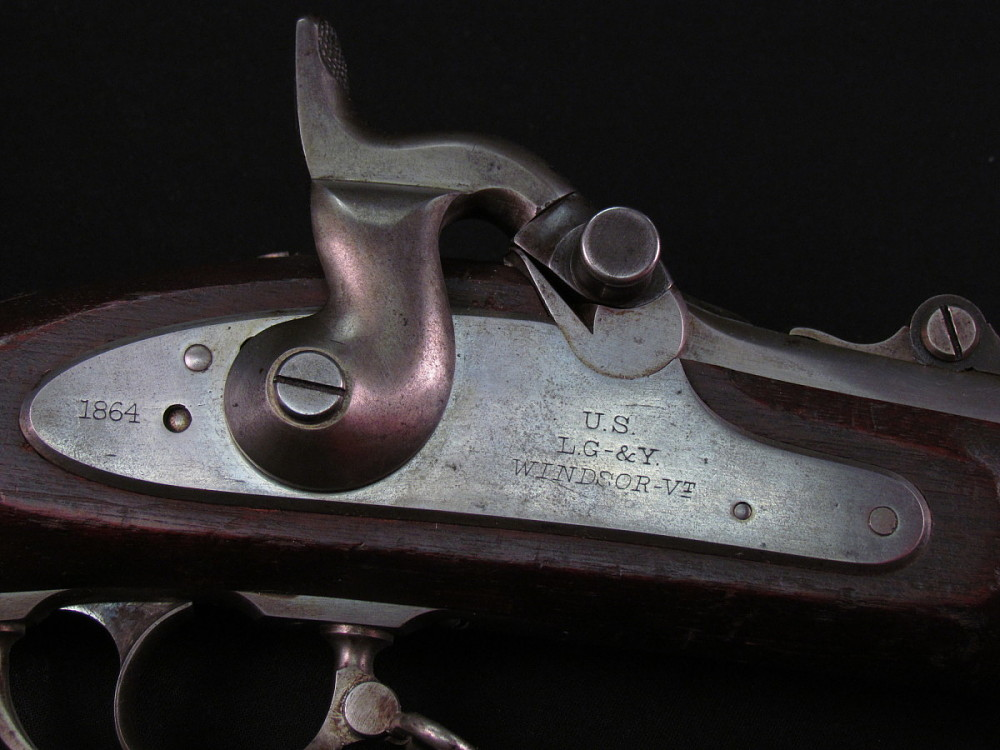
L.G & Y., Springfield Model 1861, built in 1864 toward the end of the war

  - Arming the Union: Gunmakers in Windsor, Vermont uncovers the influence of a little-known factory called Lamson, Goodnow & Yale, founded by Ebenezer G. Lamson, and Burrage Buchanan Yale, son of manufacturer Burrage Yale. Operating out of the old Robbins & Lawrence armory in Windsor, the machine tool firm played a critical role in outfitting the Union Army. Altogether, the North produced more than 1.5 million rifles in the span of about three years, along with tens of thousands of pistols and carbines. The majority of those weapons were made using machinery designed and produced in Windsor. Arming the Union tells the story of the men and machines that made possible the production of guns on such a massive scale—the story of the technological achievement that saved the Union.
  - The two stories also overlap—and not simply because Vermont soldiers, like most in the Union Army, carried weapons produced on Vermont-made machinery. Half a dozen young men actually worked in the Windsor armory before shouldering rifles and heading off to war. Both exhibits are set inside the actual nineteenth-century factory building where the gunmaking machinery was perfected and built and where 50,000 Special Model 1861 rifle muskets were also produced by Lamson, Goodnow & Yale, in partnership with Samuel Colt. (Note: From Graf, "The U.S. Special Model 1861 Contract Rifle-Musket differed considerably from the regulation U.S. Model 1861 Rifle-Musket. In fact, very few parts interchange, with the exception of a few screws, the fore-tip, side screw ferrules and trigger assembly. The motivation behind the production of this weapon seems to be the availability of Enfield rifle-musket-making machinery in Hartford, Conn., and Windsor, Vermont. Sitting unused since the bankruptcy of Robbins & Lawrence following the cancellation of their British arms contracts, Colt eyed the machinery as an economical and expedient measure to meeting the Government’s demands for weapons." LG & Y worked with Samuel Colt to fill the contracts order.) Together these two exhibitions present a rarely seen view of Vermont's role in the Civil War.
- 2017: Tribute to Brown and Sharpe

== Current Exhibits ==
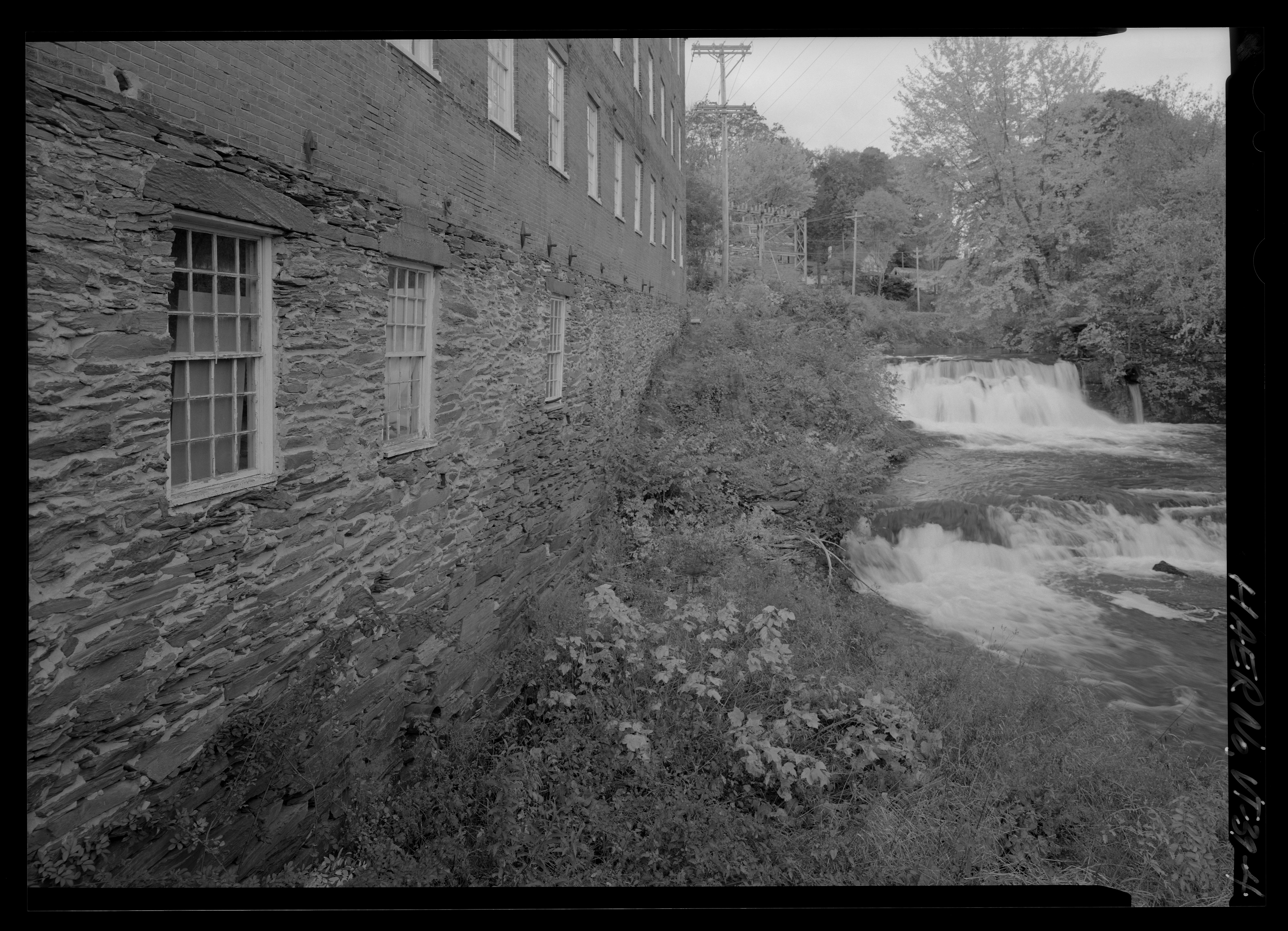
North elevation of museum looking southwest., waterfalls for waterpower

=== 2016 - Present: Shaping America: Machines and Machinists at Work ===
This 4,000 square-foot exhibition focuses on the people whose work made great societal changes possible and the rise of the “American System” of manufacturing. “Shaping America” is the first comprehensive exhibition to examine Vermont's industrial history in-depth and explores the broad themes of innovation and problem solving, craftsmanship, and the influence of precision manufacturing upon American history and culture. Precision manufacturing reinforced the growth of the American middle class and laid the foundation for the consumer culture that developed during the 19th and 20th centuries. The program was supported by the National Endowment for the Humanities.

== See also ==
- American system of manufacturing
- Industrial Revolution
- Machine tool builder
- Machine tools
- Machining
- List of National Historic Landmarks in Vermont
- National Register of Historic Places listings in Windsor County, Vermont
