= South Reading Academy =

- U.S. National Register of Historic Places
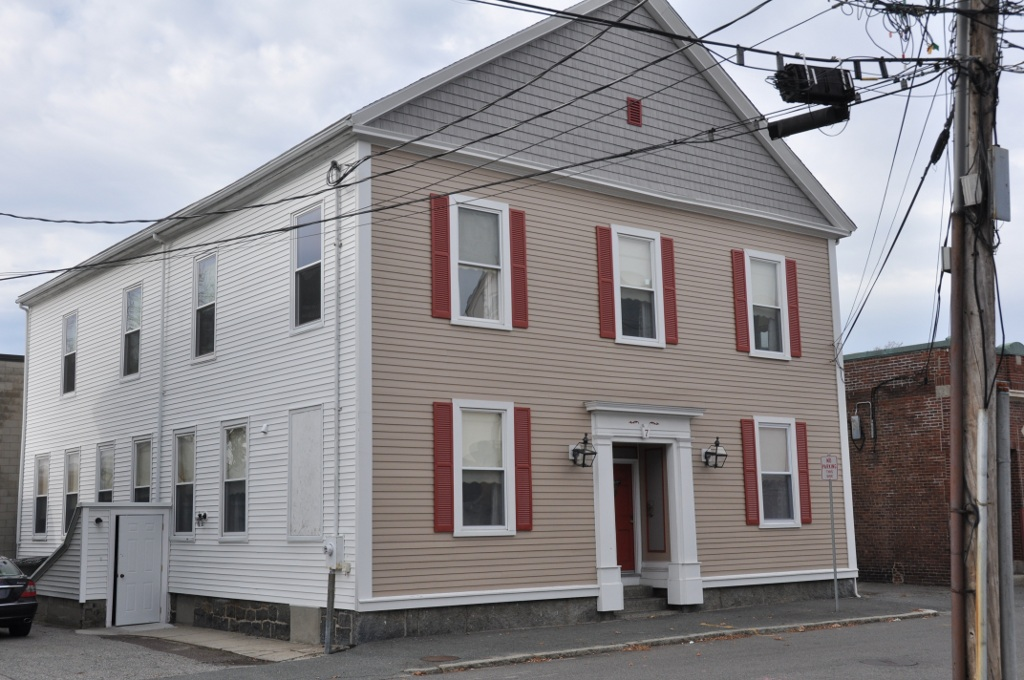

- Location within Massachusetts Location within the United States
- Location: 7 Foster St., Wakefield, Massachusetts
- Coordinates: 42°30′11″N 71°4′19″W
- Built: 1828
- Architect: Wiley, Adam,; Et al.
- Architectural style: Federal
- MPS: Wakefield MRA
- NRHP reference No.: 89000713
- Added to NRHP: July 06, 1989

South Reading Academy is a historic former school building at 7 Foster Street in Wakefield, Massachusetts, US. Built in 1828–29 for the First Baptist Church, the building has served as a religious school, public high school, clubhouse, and commercial space. The building was listed on the National Register of Historic Places in 1989.

== Description and history ==
The South Reading Academy is located on the west side of Foster Street, a short street in the center of Wakefield that runs parallel and west of Main Street. It is a 2 1/2-story wood-frame structure, three bays wide, with a front-facing gable roof. The main facade, facing east, is symmetrically arranged, with the entrance centered in a recess that is framed by pilasters and an entablature. The front gable is fully pedimented, with a decorative shingle pattern at its center.

The academy was built c. 1828–29 for the First Baptist Church as an academy and meeting house, and was one of the earliest of its kind. It was originally located on Academy Hill, where the Lincoln School was later built. The Baptists used it until 1847, when the town acquired the building for use as a public high school. The town stopped using it as a school in 1871, and in 1891 it was moved to its present location, where it has served over the years as home to a chapter of the Grand Army of the Republic, a Methodist church congregation, and the Fraternal Order of Eagles. It was severely damaged by fire in the 1970s, but was restored for use as a commercial building.

== See also ==
- National Register of Historic Places listings in Wakefield, Massachusetts
- National Register of Historic Places listings in Middlesex County, Massachusetts
