= Vinton-Boardman Farmhouse =

Historic house in Massachusetts, United States

- U.S. National Register of Historic Places
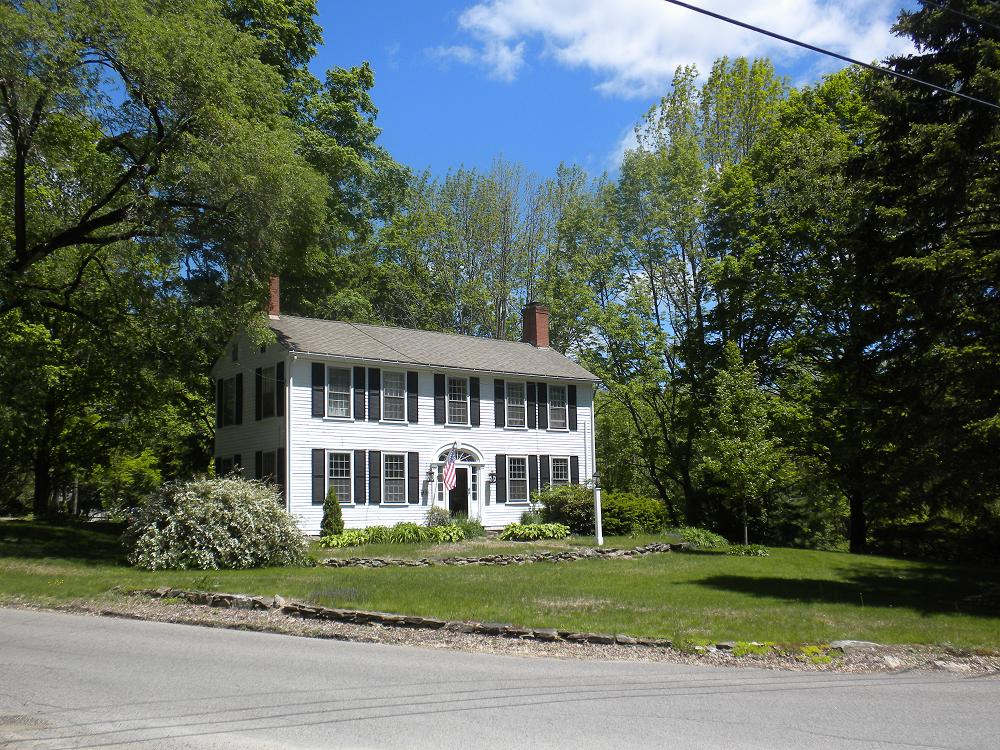

- Location within Massachusetts Location within the United States
- Location: 93 Torrey Rd., Southbridge, Massachusetts
- Coordinates: 42°5′7″N 72°0′33″W
- Built: 1760
- Architectural style: Federal
- MPS: Southbridge MRA
- NRHP reference No.: 89000586
- Added to NRHP: June 22, 1989

The Vinton-Boardman Farmhouse is a historic farm at 93 Torrey Road in Southbridge, Massachusetts.

The Vinton-Boardman Farmhouse was built in 1760 and added to the National Register of Historic Places in 1989. It was built on land that belonged to the Vinton family since 1738. In 1825 (beams originating from c. 1800), the formal 2 over 2 front was added. The home was sold by the Vintons to the Boardman family in 1894. Ms. Harriet Boardman ran a dairy farm on the property, while her single sister taught school in Southbridge. Upon her death in 1930, Ms. Boardman bequeathed the farm to the MSPCA. It changed hands in 1961 and again in 1965. In 1969 Carl Schubert, a local artist and teacher bought the home and devoted the next 12 years to restoring it. In 1981, David and Kathy Hardwick bought the home and spent 25 years continuing his work, tastefully restoring and renovating it, and landscaping the grounds with lush plantings. At that time, the back wing was still recognizable as the creamery it had been during the home's farm days. In 1995 this wing was renovated, but is still known as The Creamery in honor of its past usage. Beneath The Creamery, accessible by a cleverly concealed trap-door, is a root cellar and Indian cellar, where early settlers could hide and defend themselves from Indian attackers. The home changed hands again twice more, and is now occupied by the Alesci family who are committed to preserving its historic significance for farming and architecture. The entrance hall staircase walls, and the walls flanking the middle upstairs window are gracefully curved, and thought to be one of the earliest examples of this type of architecture.

== See also ==
- National Register of Historic Places listings in Southbridge, Massachusetts
- National Register of Historic Places listings in Worcester County, Massachusetts
