= Boardman House (Saugus, Massachusetts) =

Historic house in Massachusetts, United States

- U.S. National Register of Historic Places
- U.S. National Historic Landmark
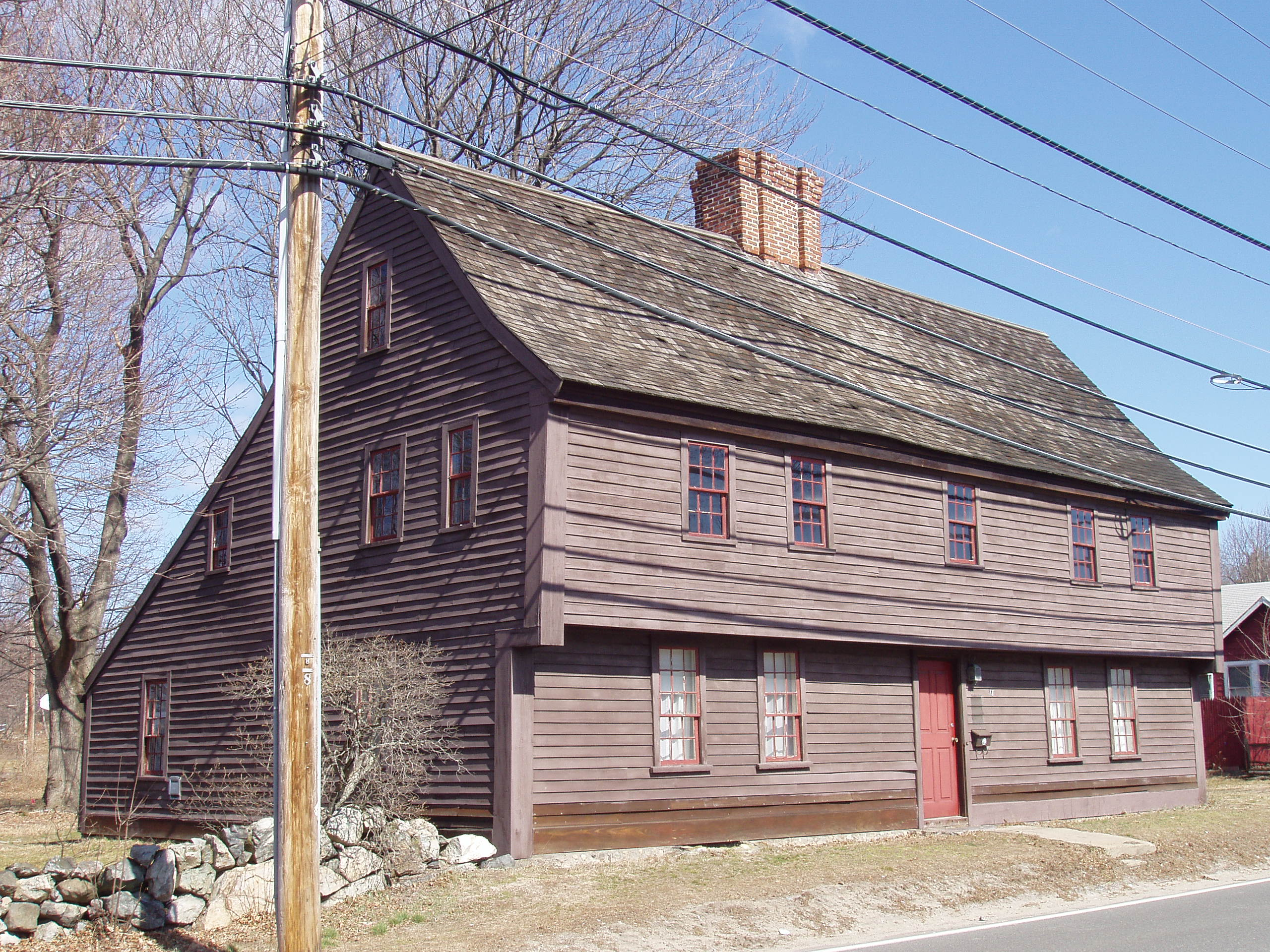
- The Boardman House, Saugus, Massachusetts

- Location within Massachusetts Location within the United States
- Location: 17 Howard Street, Saugus, Massachusetts
- Coordinates: 42°28′20″N 71°02′16″W
- Area: 0.75-acre (0.30 ha)
- Built: 1692
- NRHP reference No.: 66000131

Significant dates
- Added to NRHP: October 15, 1966
- Designated NHL: November 5, 1961

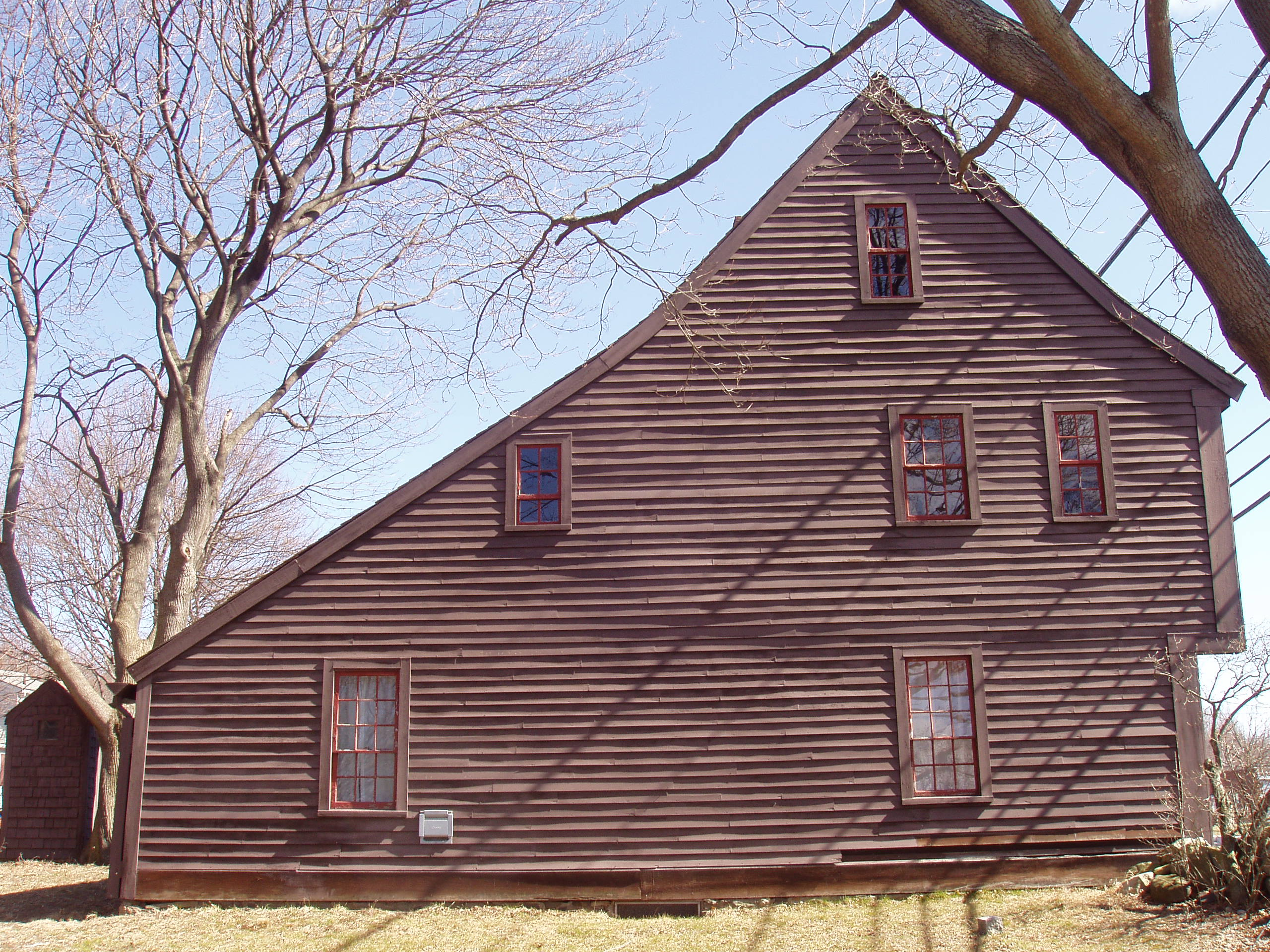
Side view.

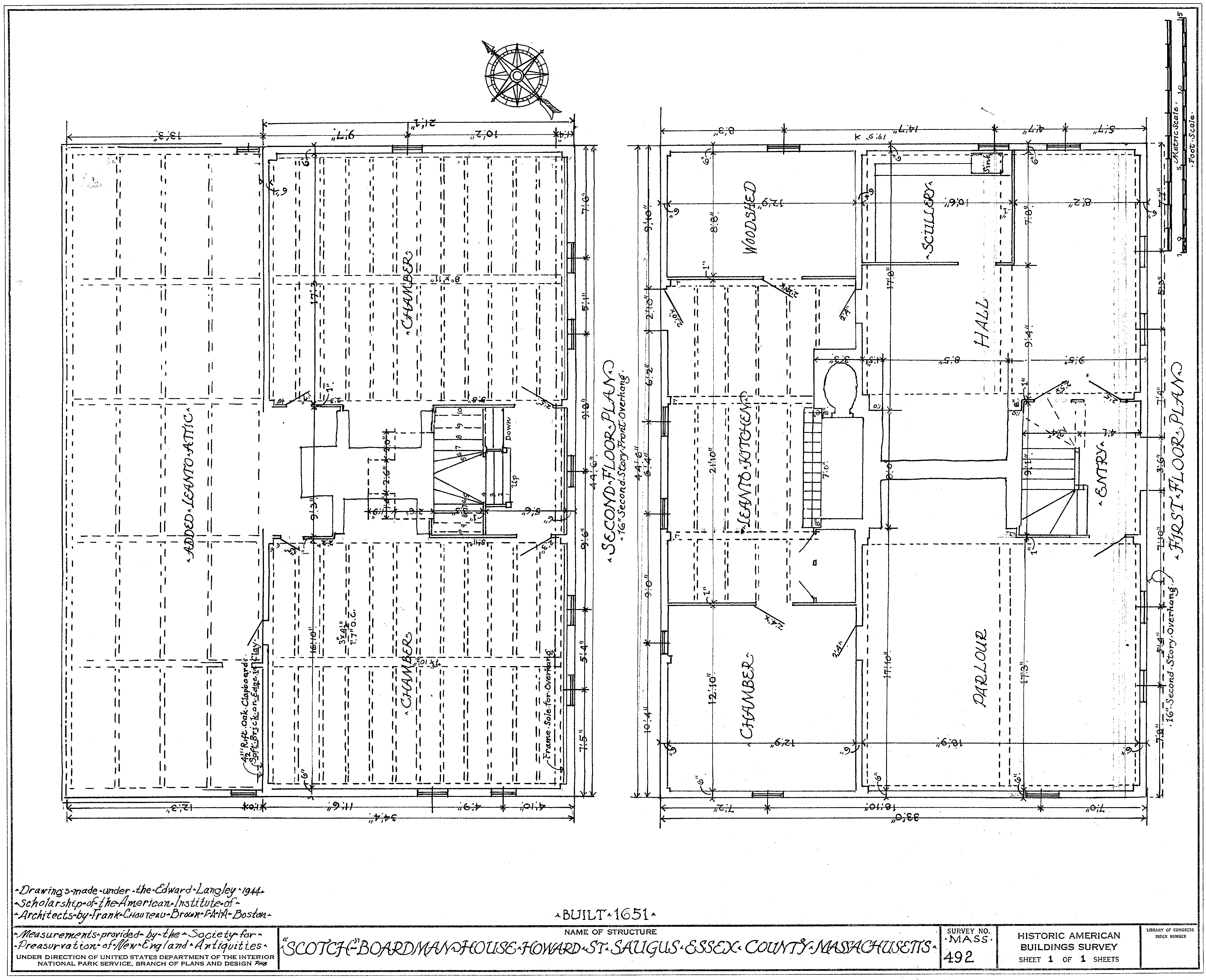
Floor plans.

The Boardman House, also known as the Scotch-Boardman House or the Bennett-Boardman House, is a historic house located at 17 Howard Street, Saugus, Massachusetts. Built in 1692, it was designated a National Historic Landmark in 1961 because of the remarkable amount of original building material still present in the house. It has been owned by Historic New England since 1914, and is open to the public on select weekends between June and October.

== Description and history ==
The property was purchased by William Boardman, with a different house standing on it, in 1686. Although this house was long thought to have been built not long after this purchase, dendrochronology research on its beams confirms a later construction date of 1692.

The house as first built had two rooms per floor, with a central chimney. On the ground floor it has a parlor and hall, with two bedrooms above, and an attic above the bedrooms. By 1696 a characteristic lean-to was added at the rear for the kitchen and milkroom giving it the appearance of a saltbox. This lean-to was completely rebuilt in 1731, reusing some of the timbers of the old one. There are five fireplaces in the house, one in each of the original rooms, and another in the kitchen.

Although the house's general shape has not changed since this time, its original leaded-glass windows were at some point replaced with more modern sash windows, two original front gables were removed, and in about 1725 a new interior staircase was added.

The house was owned by members of the Boardman family from its construction until 1911, when the property was sold to a developer. Concerns over the preservation of the landmark house brought it to the attention of William Sumner Appleton, who purchased the house in 1914 for the Society for the Preservation of New England Antiquities, now Historic New England. The society restored most of the house to its original late 17th/early 18th-century appearance, removing wallpaper and other 19th-century artifacts.

The house was declared a National Historic Landmark in 1961, and listed on the National Register of Historic Places in 1966.

== See also ==
- John Boardman House in Boxford, built by William Boardman's grandson
- List of National Historic Landmarks in Massachusetts
- National Register of Historic Places listings in Essex County, Massachusetts
- List of the oldest buildings in Massachusetts
- List of historic houses in Massachusetts
- Saugus Iron Works
