= John Boardman House =

Historic house in Massachusetts, United States

- U.S. National Register of Historic Places
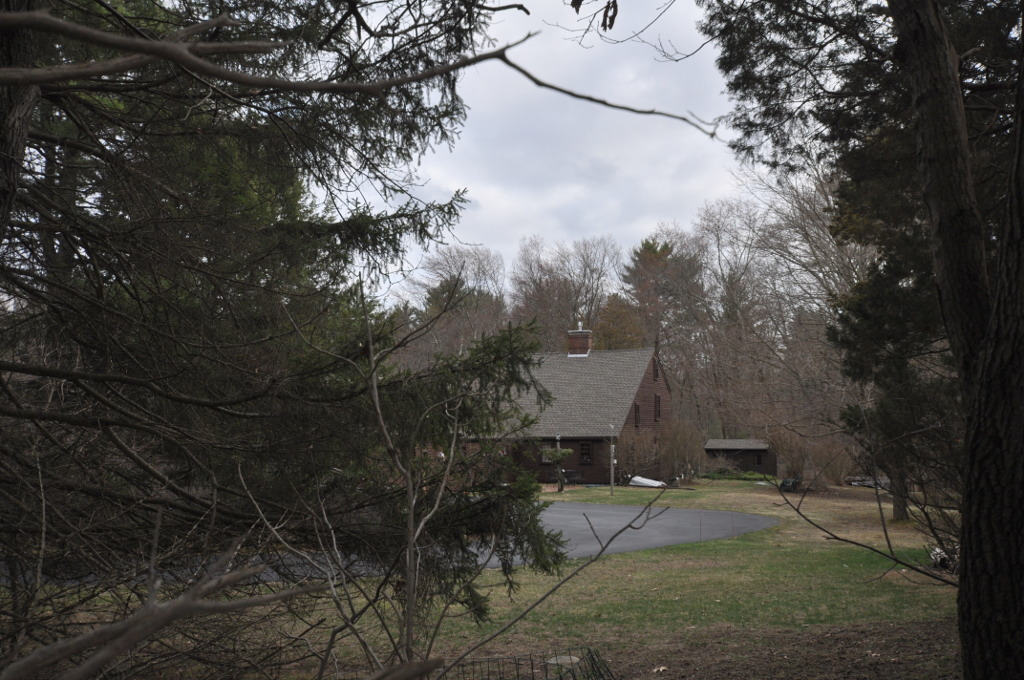

- Location within Massachusetts Location within the United States
- Location: 28 Lawrence Road, Boxford, Massachusetts
- Coordinates: 42°39′56″N 71°1′28″W
- Built: 1740
- Architectural style: Colonial
- MPS: First Period Buildings of Eastern Massachusetts TR
- NRHP reference No.: 90000361
- Added to NRHP: March 9, 1990

The John Boardman House is a historic First Period house in Boxford, Massachusetts. Its oldest portion dates to about 1740, but it has stylistically older elements. It was moved to its current location from Saugus in 1956, before which it had undergone restoration. It was listed on the National Register of Historic Places in 1990.

== Description and history ==
The John Boardman House stands in a rural residential area, on the south side of Lawrence Road, a through street connecting Boxford center to the east and North Andover to the west. It is set at a distance from the road on 2.2 acres (0.89 ha) of land, and faces Fish Brook, a tributary of the Ipswich River. It is a 2 1/2-story timber-framed structure, with a side gable roof, central chimney, and clapboarded exterior. It has a four-bay front facade, with the entrance in the center-right bay. The roof on the rear of the house (facing the street) extends down to the first floor, giving the house a classic Colonial period saltbox profile. The oldest features of the house are visible in its right-side rooms. The ground floor parlor has exposed timber framing, with an unchamfered summer beam, and a fireplace wall with feathered panels. The chamber above that room also has exposed framing. The entry staircase is a typical late First Period winding stair with a turned newel post.

The oldest portion of the house, its right side, was built sometime between 1740 and 1760, based on stylistic analysis. Originally located in Saugus it is unusual for the types of First Period details present despite its comparatively late date of construction for that period. The house bears some resemblance to the house of John Boardman's grandfather, William (now a National Historic Landmark), which still stands in Saugus. When first built, it was a double cell plan central chimney structure; the leanto section in the back is estimated to have been added c. 1800. While still located in Saugus, the building underwent a restoration by Earl Newton with the assistance of Abbott Lowell Cummings. It was moved to its present location in 1956.

== See also ==
- National Register of Historic Places listings in Essex County, Massachusetts
- List of the oldest buildings in Massachusetts
