= Common District (Wakefield, Massachusetts) =

Historic district in Massachusetts, United States

- U.S. National Register of Historic Places
- U.S. Historic district
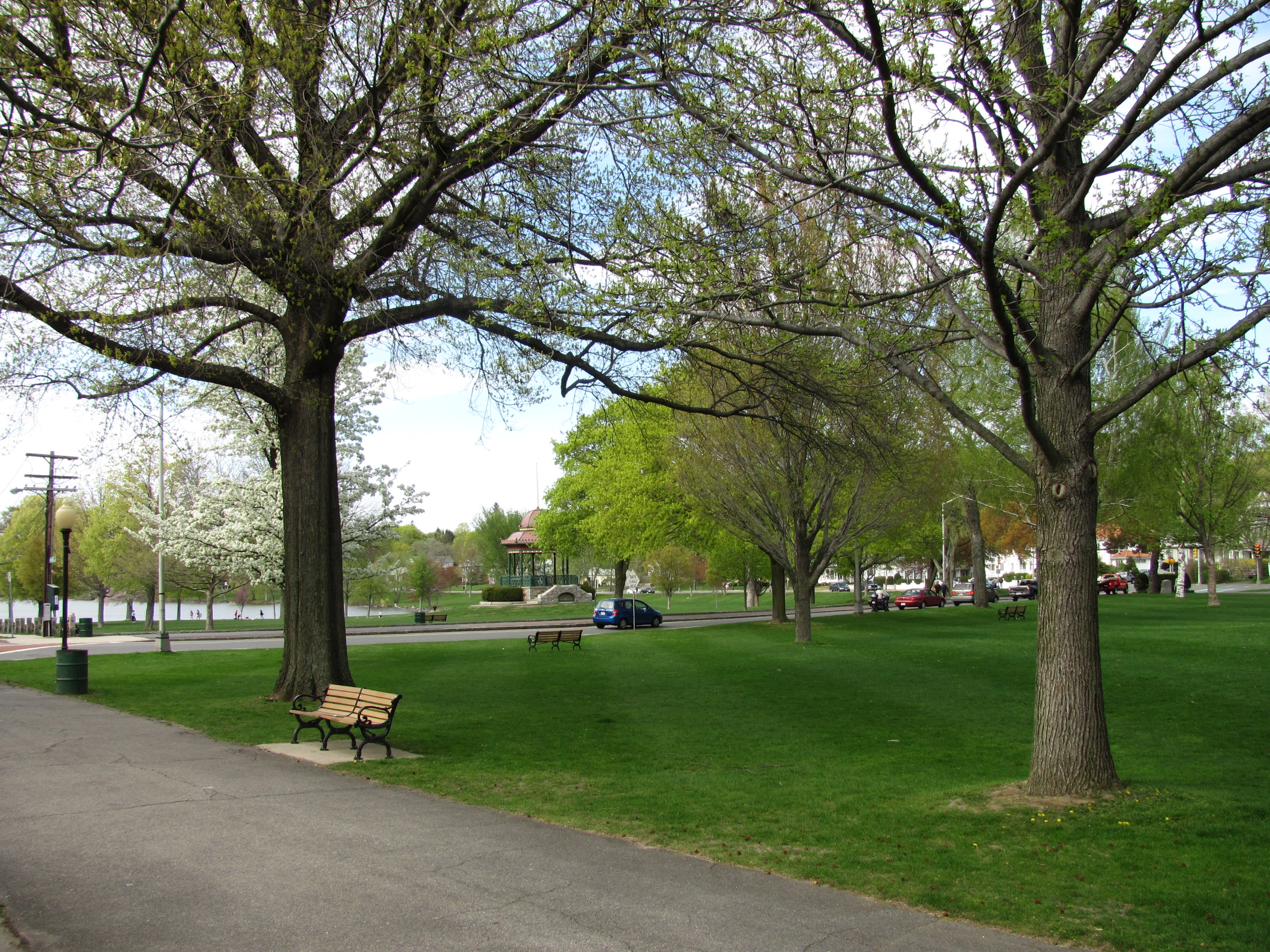
- Wakefield Common

- Location within Massachusetts Location within the United States
- Location: Wakefield, Massachusetts
- Coordinates: 42°30′23″N 71°4′23″W
- Area: 25 acres (10 ha)
- Architect: Multiple
- Architectural style: Late 19th And 20th Century Revivals, Late Victorian
- MPS: Wakefield MRA
- NRHP reference No.: 89000754
- Added to NRHP: March 2, 1990

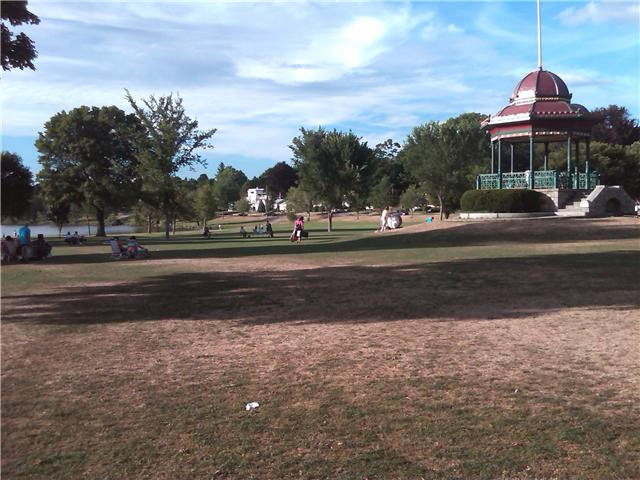
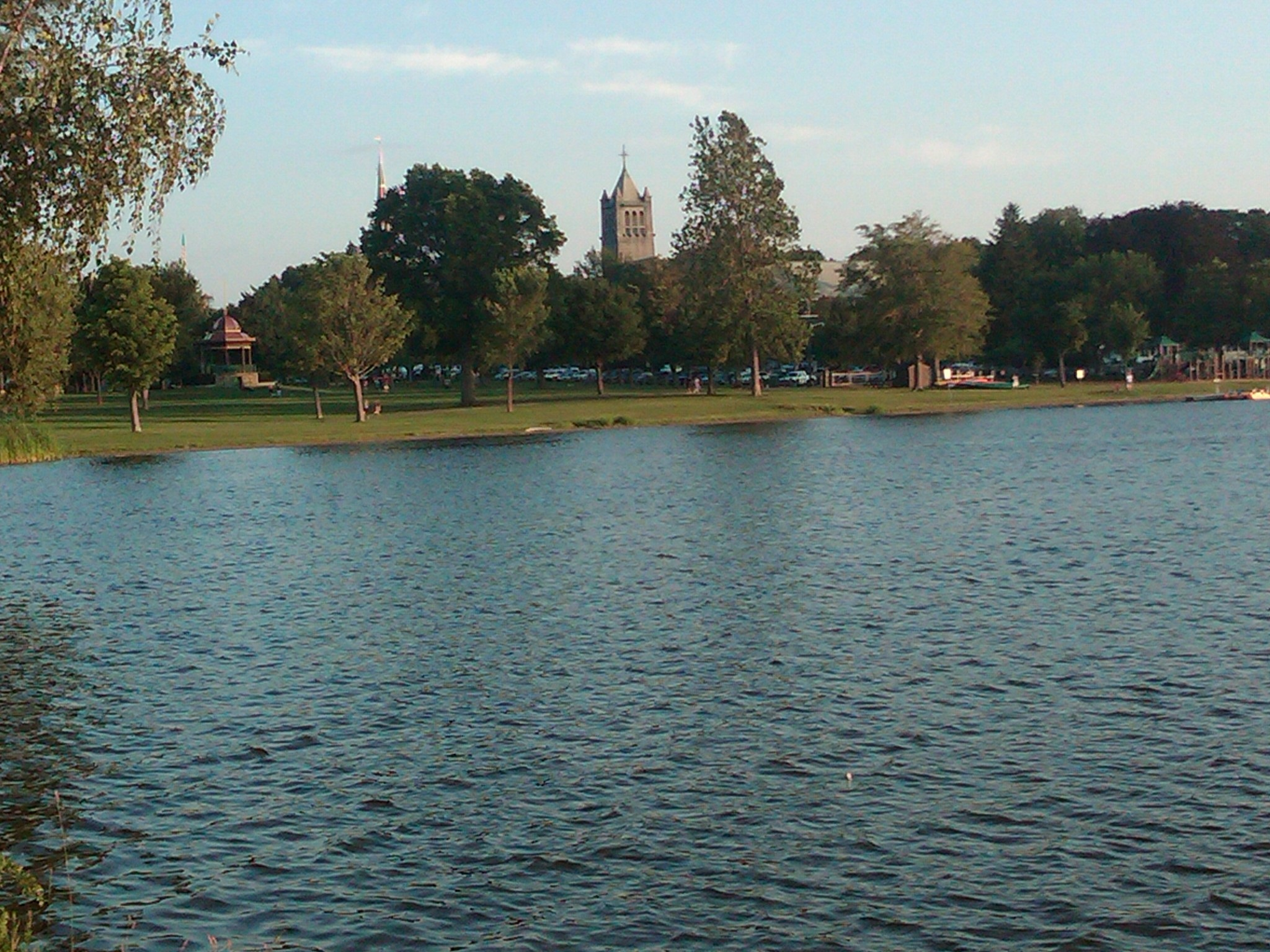
The bandstand on the Common (top); the Common District as viewed from Lake Quannapowitt (bottom).

The Common District encompasses the main civic center of Wakefield, Massachusetts. It is centered on the historic town common, just south of Lake Quannapowitt, which was laid in 1644, when it became the heart of Old Reading. The area was separated from Reading as South Reading in 1818, and renamed Wakefield in 1868. The 25 acre district includes the buildings that line the common on Common Street and Main Street, which include the town hall, public library, YMCA, post office, and several churches. It was listed on the National Register of Historic Places in 1990.

== Description and history ==
The town of Wakefield is located north of Boston, Massachusetts, and was originally part of Reading, which was established in 1644 on the southern shore of Lake Quannapowitt. Wakefield broke away from Reading in 1818 as South Reading, and was renamed Wakefield in 1868. The area of the common has continuously served as the civic and religious center of the community since its founding. The common was set aside in 1647, and its boundaries more formally demarcated in 1741. The common has since then been line with buildings and structures of civic importance, as well as residences. The original town burial ground stands behind the First Congregational Church, whose current building dates to about 1892.

The oldest surviving buildings facing the common date to the early 19th century, and include a few Federal period houses and the 1839 First Universalist Church. In addition to it and the Congregational Church, there are two other churches, dating to later in the 19th century. Most of the town's principal civic buildings date to the early 20th century, including the Lucius Beebe Memorial Library (1923), the main post office (1936), and the YMCA (1938). Town Hall was built in the 19th century as a high school, with Italianate features, and was restyled in 1938 when it was converted to house town offices.

== See also ==
- National Register of Historic Places listings in Wakefield, Massachusetts
- National Register of Historic Places listings in Middlesex County, Massachusetts
