= E. Boardman House =

Historic house in Massachusetts, United States

- U.S. National Register of Historic Places
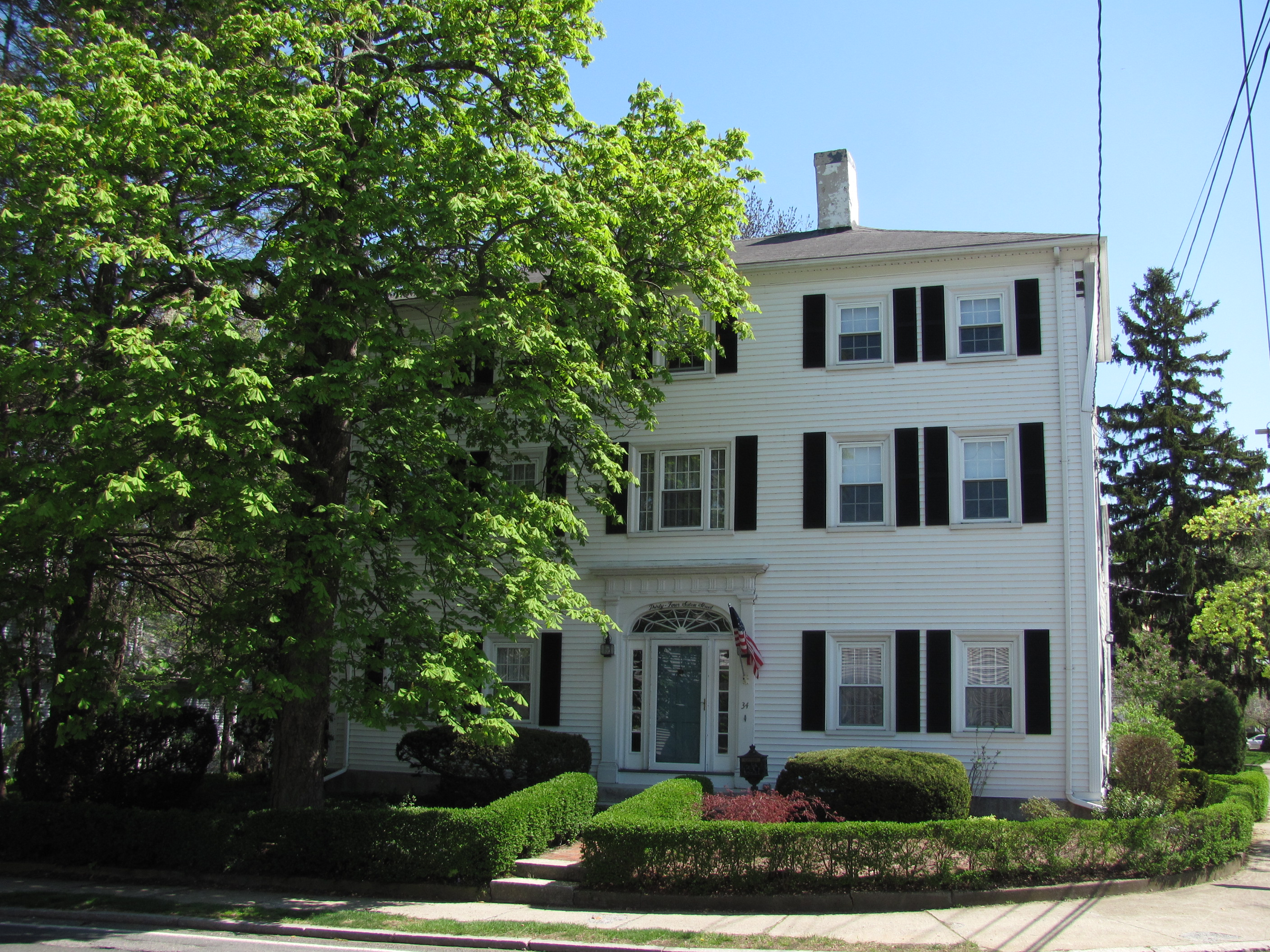
- E. Boardman House

- Location within Massachusetts Location within the United States
- Location: 34 Salem St., Wakefield, Massachusetts
- Coordinates: 42°30′31″N 71°4′7″W
- Area: less than one acre
- Built: 1790
- Architect: Boardman, Elias
- Architectural style: Federal
- MPS: Wakefield MRA
- NRHP reference No.: 89000686
- Added to NRHP: July 06, 1989

The Elias Boardman House is a historic house at 34 Salem Street in Wakefield, Massachusetts. Built in 1790, it is one of the city's most elaborate examples of Federal period architecture. It was built by Elias Boardman, and was dubbed Boardman's Folly for its extravagance. It was listed on the National Register of Historic Places in 1989.

== Description and history ==
The Boardman House stands in a residential area northeast of downtown Wakefield, at the southeast corner of Pleasant and Salem Streets. It is a three-story wood-frame structure, five bays wide and five bays deep, with a hip roof and interior chimneys. The third floor windows, in a typical Federal period twist, are smaller than those on the lower two floors. The building corners have slender pilasters rising to a full entablature and modillioned cornice. It has en elaborate entrance surround, with sidelight windows, pilasters, and a corniced entablature. Above the entrance is a Palladian three-part window that is probably a later addition. The interior follows a central hall plan, and has a particularly fine carved central staircase.

This large Federal style house was built in 1790 by Elias Boardman, a builder who had worked extensively in Boston. The house's decorations were so extravagant for what was then rural South Reading it was dubbed "Boardman's Folly". The stylistic elements are more typical of those found in the more sophisticated settings of Boston and Salem.

== See also ==
- National Register of Historic Places listings in Wakefield, Massachusetts
- National Register of Historic Places listings in Middlesex County, Massachusetts
