= Richardson House =

Richardson House may refer to:

in the United States

(by state)

- Richardson-Turner House, Lexa, Arkansas, listed on the NRHP in Arkansas
- Nathaniel Richardson House, Middlebury, Connecticut, listed on the NRHP in Connecticut
- Richardson House (Bradenton, Florida), listed on the NRHP in Florida
- House at 7249 San Pedro, Jacksonville, Florida, also known as the Richardson House, NRHP-listed
- Richardson-Jakway House, Aurora, Iowa, listed on the NRHP in Iowa
- Richardson House (Brandenburg, Kentucky), listed on the NRHP in Kentucky
- Richardson House (Brunswick, Maine), listed on the NRHP in Maine
- John Richardson House (Barnstable, Massachusetts), NRHP-listed
- Fisher-Richardson House, Mansfield, Massachusetts, NRHP-listed
- Dexter Richardson House, Uxbridge, Massachusetts, NRHP-listed
- Joseph Richardson House (Uxbridge, Massachusetts), NRHP-listed
- Dr. S. O. Richardson House, Wakefield, Massachusetts, NRHP-listed
- Zachariah Richardson House, Winchester, Massachusetts, NRHP-listed
- Owen-Richardson-Owen House, Columbus, MS, listed on the NRHP in Mississippi
- Abijah Richardson, Sr. Homestead, Dublin, NH, listed on the NRHP in New Hampshire
- Deacon Abijah Richardson House, Dublin, NH, listed on the NRHP in New Hampshire
- John Richardson Homestead, Dublin, NH, listed on the NRHP in New Hampshire
- Luke Richardson House, Dublin, NH, listed on the NRHP in New Hampshire
- Thomas Richardson House, Ilion, NY, listed on the NRHP in New York
- John Richardson House (Lancaster, New York), property listed on the National Register of Historic Places in Erie County, New York
- Richardson-Bates House, Oswego, NY, listed on the NRHP in New York
- William Richardson House, Union Springs, NY, listed on the NRHP in New York
- Marshall-Harris-Richardson House, Raleigh, NC, listed on the NRHP in New York
- Richardson Houses Historic District, Reidsville, NC, listed on the NRHP in New York
- Viets Hotel, Grand Forks, North Dakota, also known as Richardson House, NRHP-listed
- Richardson-Ulrich House, Klamath Falls, OR, listed on the NRHP in Oregon
- Joseph Richardson House (Langhorne, Pennsylvania), listed on the NRHP in Pennsylvania
- Asher and Mary Isabelle Richardson House, Asherton, TX, listed on the NRHP in Texas
- Jacob F. Richardson House, Park City, UT, listed on the NRHP in Utah
- Richardson-Jackson House, Spokane, WA, listed on the NRHP in Washington
- Richardson-Brinkman Cobblestone House, Clinton, WI, listed on the NRHP in Wisconsin
- Richardson Grout House, Evansville, WI, listed on the NRHP in Wisconsin
- Hamilton Richardson House, Janesville, WI, listed on the NRHP in Wisconsin
- Richardson's Overland Trail Ranch, Laramie, WY, listed on the NRHP in Wyoming

elsewhere

- Richardson House (Toronto hotel) was the first name of a hotel in Toronto, later named the Spadina Hotel

== See also ==
- John Richardson House (disambiguation)
- Joseph Richardson House (disambiguation)
