= Joseph Richardson House =

Joseph Richardson House may refer to:

- Joseph Richardson House (Uxbridge, Massachusetts), listed on the National Register of Historic Places (NRHP)
- Joseph Richardson House (Langhorne, Pennsylvania), listed on the NRHP in Bucks County, Pennsylvania

== See also ==
- Richardson House (disambiguation)
