= Luke Richardson House =

Historic house in New Hampshire, United States

- U.S. National Register of Historic Places
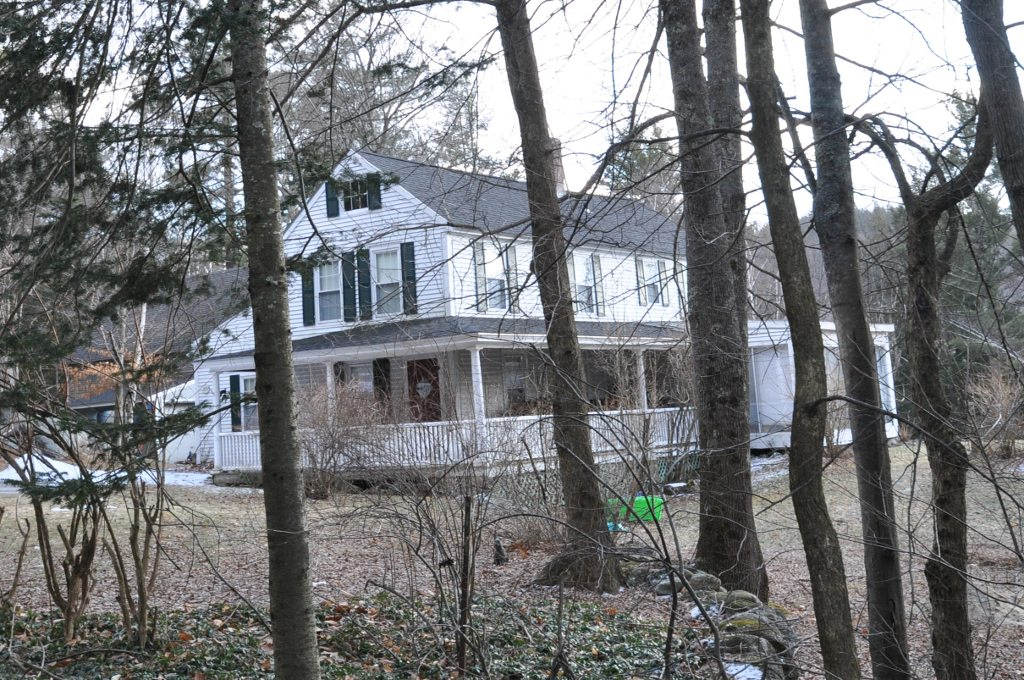

- Location within New Hampshire Location within the United States
- Location: 204 Hancock Rd., Dublin, New Hampshire
- Coordinates: 42°54′35″N 72°0′44″W
- Area: less than one acre
- Built: 1820
- Architectural style: Greek Revival
- MPS: Dublin MRA
- NRHP reference No.: 83004073
- Added to NRHP: December 15, 1983

The Luke Richardson House is a historic house at 204 Hancock Road in Dublin, New Hampshire. Built about 1820, it is a good local example of a mid-19th century farmhouse with modest Greek Revival features. It was listed on the National Register of Historic Places in 1983.

== Description and history ==
The Luke Richardson House stands in a rural setting in eastern Dublin, on the south side of Hancock Road (New Hampshire Route 137) about 1 mile (1.6 km) north of its junction with New Hampshire Route 101. It is a 2 1/2-story wood-frame structure, with a gabled roof and clapboarded exterior. It has an unusually narrow profile, with a two-bay front facade. A single-story porch extends across the front and along one side. An early 20th-century barn stands nearby on the property.

The house was built c. 1820 by Luke Richardson, son of early settler Abijah Richardson, Sr, whose early homestead stands nearby. Luke Richardson operated a gristmill and sawmill on a nearby property, and was instrumental in establishing a Trinitarian Congregational church in Dublin in 1827. Later owners include Charles F. Appleton, who built a hydroelectric facility on Wilder Brook and provided Dublin with its first electric service, and artist Tom Blackwell, who used the barn on the property as his studio.

== See also ==
- Abijah Richardson Sr. Homestead
- Deacon Abijah Richardson House
- John Richardson Homestead
- National Register of Historic Places listings in Cheshire County, New Hampshire
