= John Richardson House =

John Richardson House may refer to:

- John Richardson House (Barnstable, Massachusetts), listed on the NRHP in Massachusetts
- John Richardson Homestead, Dublin, New Hampshire, listed on the NRHP in Cheshire County, New Hampshire
- John Richardson House (Lancaster, New York), property listed on the National Register of Historic Places in Erie County, New York

== See also ==
- Richardson House (disambiguation)
