= Union Springs =

Union Springs is the name of two places in the United States of America:

- Union Springs, Alabama
- Union Springs, New York
