= Union Springs Academy =

Location
- Spring Street Rd; Union Springs, New York 13160; United States; 42.844250°N 76.684373°W

Information
- Type: Private
- Religious affiliation: Seventh-day Adventist Church
- Grades: 9 - 12 Academy
- Accreditation: Adventist Accrediting Association
- Website: www.unionspringsacademy.org

Union Springs Academy is a private, co-ed Seventh-day Adventist prep school in Union Springs in Cayuga County, New York. It is a part of the Seventh-day Adventist education system, the world's second largest Christian school system. The academy was started in 1921 when the Seventh-day Adventist church purchased the buildings and land from the Seminary of Friends.

== See also ==
- List of Seventh-day Adventist secondary schools
- Seventh-day Adventist education
