= Almeron Durkee House =

Historic house in Union Springs, New York

- U.S. National Register of Historic Places
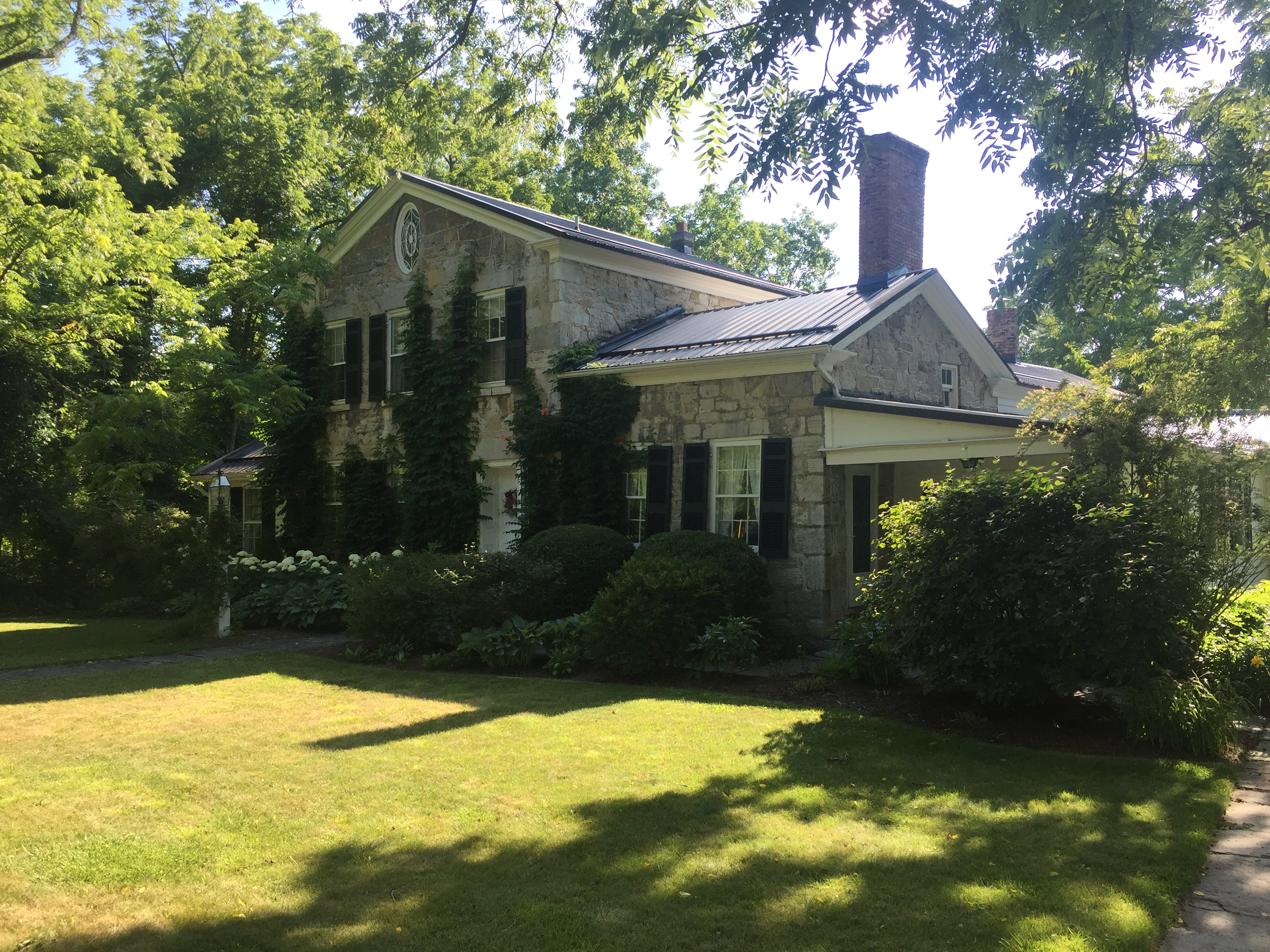
- House in 2022

- Location within New York Location within the United States
- Location: 13 Cayuga St., Union Springs, New York
- Coordinates: 42.83235°N 76.69571°W
- Area: 9 acres (3.6 ha)
- Built: 1820
- Architectural style: Federal
- NRHP reference No.: 04001455
- Added to NRHP: January 5, 2005

The Almeron Durkee House is a historic house located at 13 Cayuga Street (NY-90) in Union Springs, Cayuga County, New York.

== Description and history ==
It was built about 1820 and is a "remarkably intact" two-story, three-bay wide, side-hall stone dwelling in the Federal style. Attached to the main block are a 1 1/2-story wing and 1-story frame wing. Also on the property is a barn and stone smokehouse.

It was listed on the National Register of Historic Places on January 5, 2005.

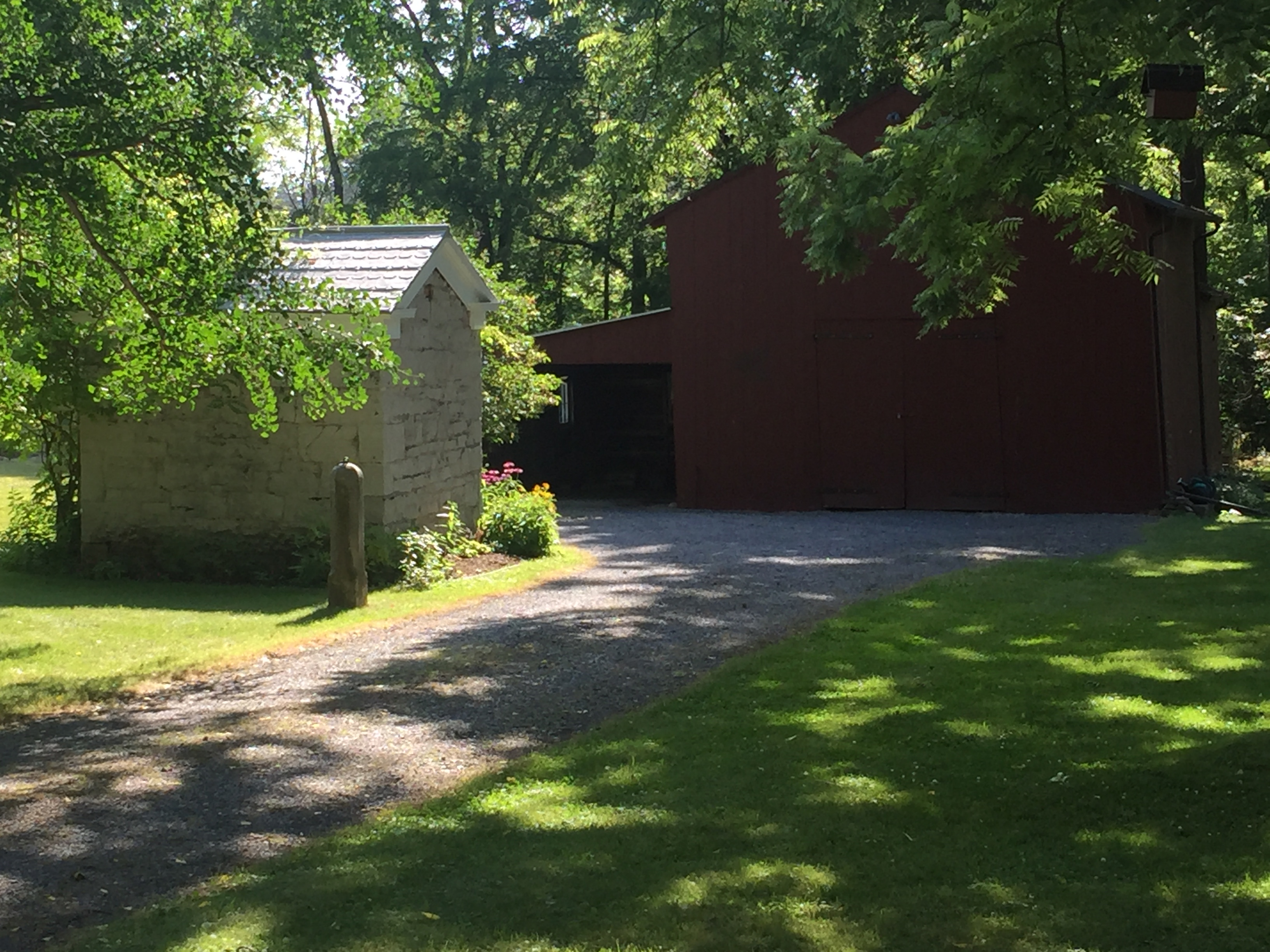
Smokehouse and barn

It was deemed architecturally "significant as an outstanding example of early nineteenth century, Federal style domestic architecture in Union Springs. Built ca.1820, the house is an imposing and remarkably intact, two-story, three-bay, side-hall Federal style dwelling that embodies the building and decorative techniques popular in the Central and Finger Lakes regions of the state during the first quarter of the nineteenth century. Built of simply dressed blocks of locally quarried limestone laid in random courses, the Durkee house is a finely crafted vernacular adaptation of high style building trends in the region. The former farmhouse is complemented by two intact support buildings (a barn and a smokehouse) that survive from the property's use as a working farm."

The house is prominent upon the west side New York State Route 90, with a 2021-posted historic marker honoring a John Irving who lived in the house 1907-13. Per the marker, he was a "schooner master and stonemason" who carved [quarried?] stone for early Cornell University buildings and the former Cornell library in Ithaca.
