= Tomlinson-Huddleston House =

Historic house in Pennsylvania, United States

- U.S. National Register of Historic Places
- U.S. Historic district – Contributing property
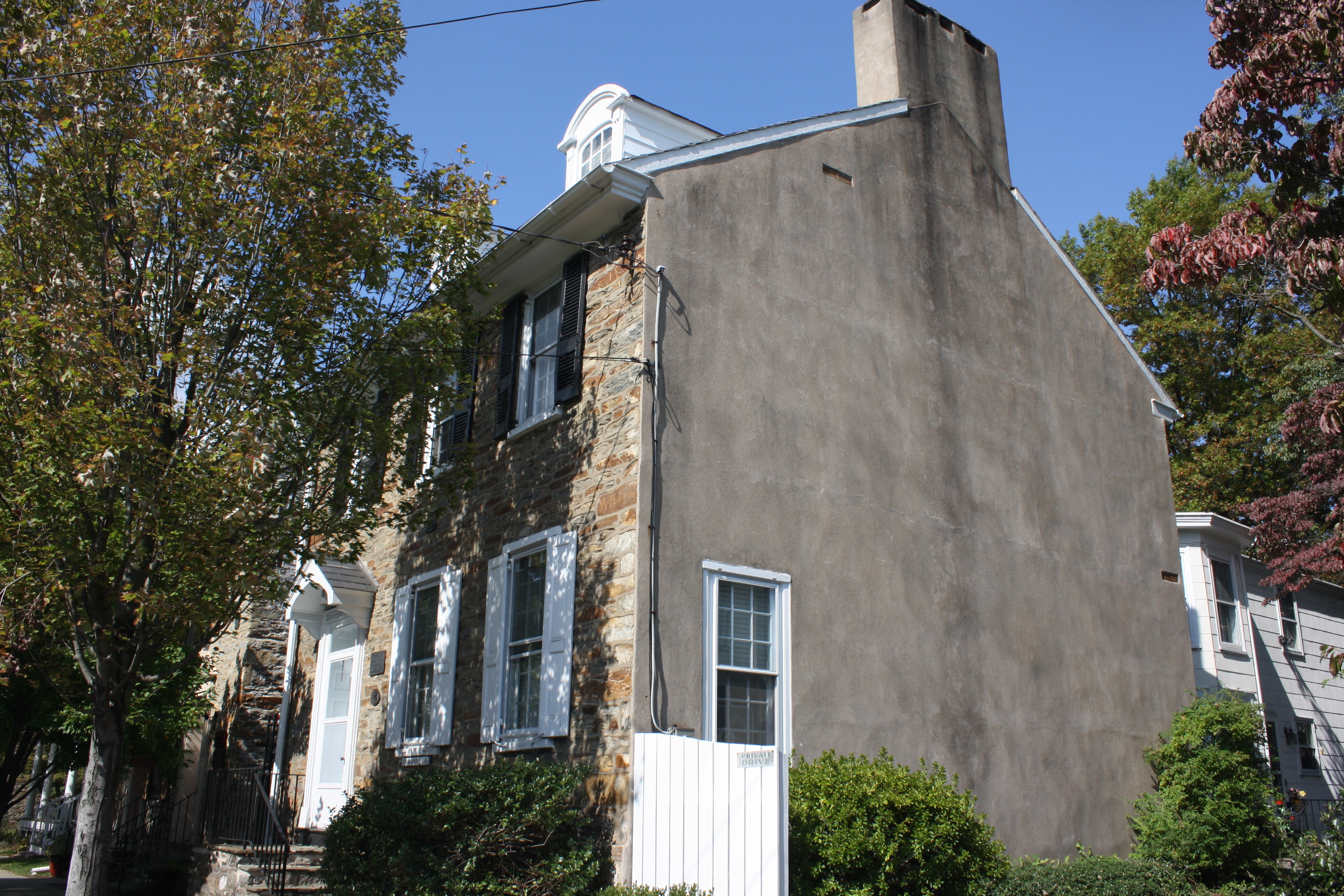
- Tomlinson-Huddleston House. September 2012.

- Location within Pennsylvania Location within the United States
- Location: 109 W. Maple Ave., Langhorne, Pennsylvania
- Coordinates: 40°10′34″N 74°55′17″W
- Area: 0.2 acres (0.081 ha)
- Built: 1783, c. 1820, c. 1965
- Built by: Watson, Isaac
- Architectural style: Georgian
- NRHP reference No.: 83004200
- Added to NRHP: November 10, 1983

The Tomlinson-Huddleston House, also known as The Signature House, is an historic home that is located in Langhorne, Bucks County, Pennsylvania, United States.

Now part of the Langhorne Historic District, it was added to the National Register of Historic Places in 1983.

== History and architectural features ==
Built in 1783, this historic structure is a 2 1/2-story, three-bay, stone dwelling with a gable roof. Designed in the Georgian style, it has a two-story, rear brick-and-frame addition with a gable roof that was added circa 1820. Another frame addition was added to the rear circa 1965. The oldest section features a total of nine stones with carved initials, names, and dates. The house was restored during the 1940s.
