= Langhorne Borough, Pennsylvania =

Borough in Pennsylvania, US

- Borough
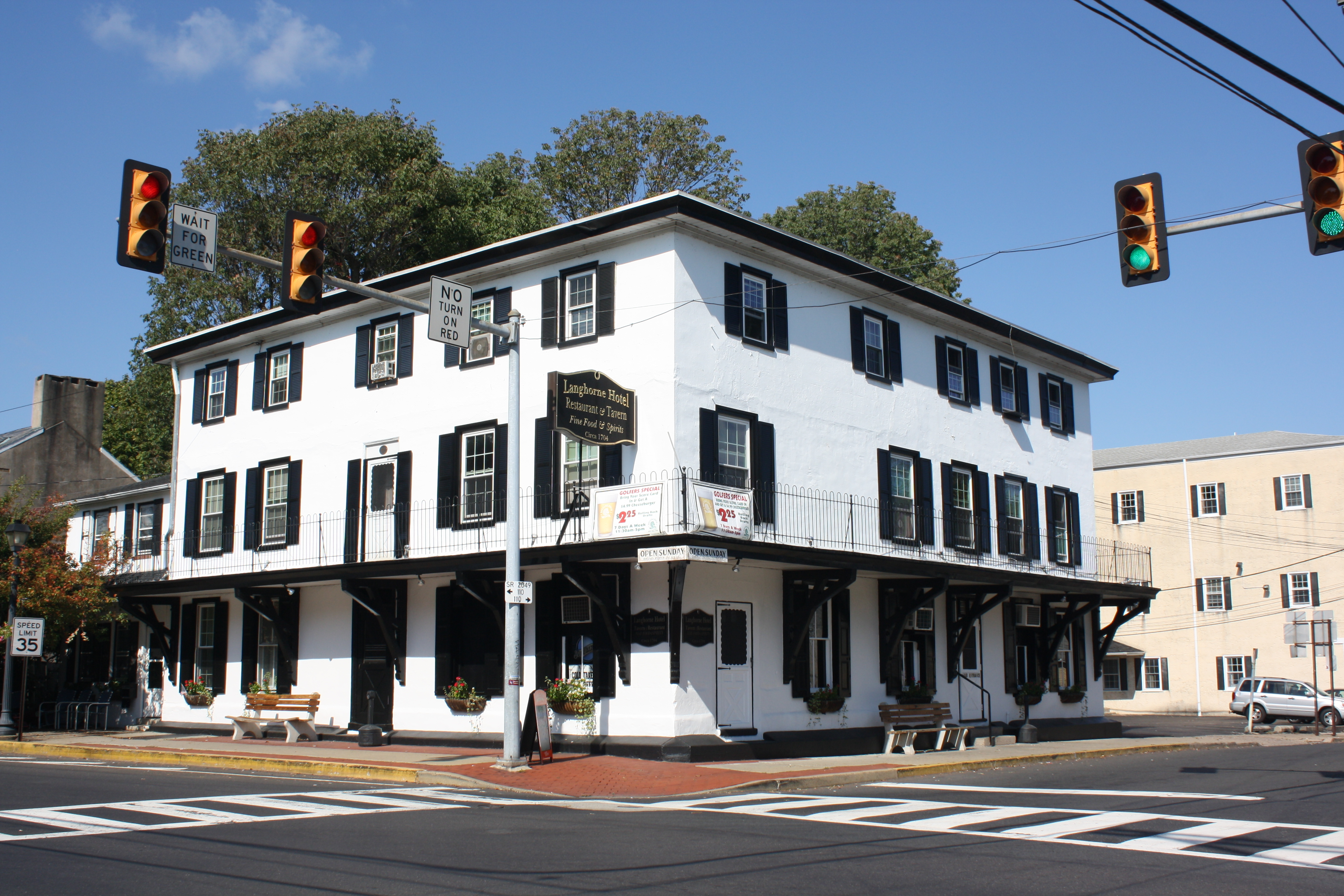
- The Langhorne Hotel

- Location in Bucks County, Pennsylvania

- Location in Pennsylvania Location in the United States
- Coordinates: 40°10′39″N 74°55′08″W
- Country: United States
- State: Pennsylvania
- County: Bucks
- Incorporated: 1876

Area
  - Total: 0.49 sq mi (1.28 km^{2})
  - Land: 0.49 sq mi (1.27 km^{2})
  - Water: 0.0039 sq mi (0.01 km^{2})
- Elevation: 213 ft (65 m)

Population (2020)
  - Total: 1,643
  - Density: 3,339.6/sq mi (1,289.42/km^{2})
- Time zone: UTC-5 (Eastern (EST))
  - Summer (DST): UTC-4 (EDT)
- ZIP Codes: 19047
- Area codes: 215, 267 and 445
- FIPS code: 42-41392
- Website: www.langhorneborough.com

Langhorne Borough, formerly known as Attleboro, is a borough in Bucks County, Pennsylvania, United States. The population was 1,643 at the time of the 2020 census.

The mailing address "Langhorne" is used for Langhorne Borough but also broadly describes the majority of surrounding Middletown Township, which for the most part uses Langhorne's ZIP code of 19047. Sesame Place, while physically located in Middletown Township, has Langhorne as its mailing address. The Langhorne post office also services the northeastern part of Lower Southampton Township, which uses the ZIP code 19053.

Langhorne Borough is approximately six miles west of the Delaware River.

Langhorne Manor is a separate borough that borders Langhorne Borough proper to the south.

== History ==
Langhorne, the town that includes Langhorne Borough, began in the 17th century at the intersection of older Lenni-Lenape paths. The earliest established settlers (three Dutch and two British) arrived in the early 18th century. One of the area's first notable residents was Joseph Richardson, who established a store and inn in the 1730s. The road from Bristol grew into a very important transportation center between Trenton and Philadelphia in the later 18th century and 19th centuries, with trade and travelers contributing to the economic growth of the area. Langhorne eventually became the stagecoach transportation hub of Bucks County, transporting people between Trenton and Philadelphia and was then known as Four Lanes End, later known as Richardsons Corner.

The first mention of Attleborough was recorded on a deed in the Recorder's Office, Deed Book 6, page 210, November 7, 1737. Isaac Hicks laid out a plan for "Washington's Square in Attleborough" in November 1783. Historian William J. Buck wrote "A resident of the place has informed me that this name is of local origin; that a William Richardson Atlee (son of Colonel Samuel Atlee of the Revolutionary Army), a lawyer and son-in-law of General Wayne, resided here about 1790 or perhaps a little earlier. A fire engine was ordered to be made, for which £50 had been raised. When it was finished, word was sent from Philadelphia inquiring what name they wanted it called. Someone suggested that, as Mr. Atlee had been one of the principal contributors, it should be named after him. When the engine arrived, it was found to have painted on its sides Atleebury, which still to be seen. Shortly afterwards a post office was established here, when it was called Attleborough, a slight change from the original." However, the post office was not established until April 1, 1806, Richard Croasdale, the first postmaster.

The village became known as Attleborough until 1876, when it was incorporated and named for Jeremiah Langhorne, an early resident of the area and former chief justice of the Supreme Court of Pennsylvania. Upon the arrival of the railroad in 1876, residents of Attleborough and Hulmeville disputed over what the name of the station should be. The president of the North Pennsylvania Railroad, Franklin A. Comly, settled the matter by naming the station The Penndel Train Station, until recently changing it to Langhorne Train Station.

A school of higher learning was established in 1835 named successively Minerva Seminary, Attleborough High School, Attleboro Academy, and Bellevue Institute. Samuel J. Randall of Philadelphia, a member of the United States House of Representatives from 1875 to 1890 and speaker of the United States House of Representatives from 1876 to 1881, attended this educational institute.

In the late 19th century and early 20th century, Langhorne Borough continued to grow as wealthy Philadelphians constructed large homes and businesses along Maple and Bellevue Avenues.

The Langhorne Historic District, former Langhorne Library, Joseph Richardson House, and Tomlinson-Huddleston House are listed on the National Register of Historic Places.

== Geography ==
Langhorne Borough is located at 40°10′39″N 74°55′8″W (40.177409, -74.918880). According to the U.S. Census Bureau, the borough has a total area of 0.5 square miles (1.3 km^{2}), all land.

== Demographics ==
Historical population
Census	Pop.	Note	%±
1880	558		—
1890	727		30.3%
1900	801		10.2%
1910	895		11.7%
1920	1,067		19.2%
1930	1,147		7.5%
1940	1,221		6.5%
1950	1,579		29.3%
1960	1,461		−7.5%
1970	1,673		14.5%
1980	1,697		1.4%
1990	1,361		−19.8%
2000	1,981		45.6%
2010	1,622		−18.1%
2020	1,643		1.3%

At the 2010 census, the borough was 86.4% White, 8.0% Black or African American, 0.1% Native American, 1.5% Asian, and 1.5% were two or more races. 2.3% of the population was of Hispanic or Latino ancestry .

At the 2000 census, there were 1,981 people, 552 households and 338 families residing in the borough. The population density was 4,016.3 inhabitants per square mile (1,550.7/km^{2}). There were 649 housing units at an average density of 1,315.8 per square mile (508.0/km^{2}).

There were 552 households, of which 25.9% had children under the age of 18 living with them, 47.5% were married couples living together, 9.8% had a female householder with no husband present, and 38.6% were non-families. 31.7% of all households were made up of individuals, and 8.7% had someone living alone who was 65 years of age or older. The average household size was 2.40 and the average family size was 3.07.

Age distribution was 26.2% under the age of 18, 10.4% from 18 to 24, 30.8% from 25 to 44, 21.8% from 45 to 64, and 10.8% who were 65 years of age or older. The median age was 34 years. For every 100 females there were 117.5 males. For every 100 females age 18 and over, there were 107.1 males.

The median household income borough was $56,389, and the median family income was $75,429. Males had a median income of $48,125 versus $31,759 for females. The per capita income for the borough was $21,479. About 2.6% of families and 3.0% of the population were below the poverty line, including 3.0% of those under age 18 and 4.7% of those age 65 or over.

== Education ==
Langhorne Borough lies within the Neshaminy School District. Students living within borough boundaries attend Tawanka Elementary School for grades K-4, Maple Point Middle School for grades 5–8, and Neshaminy High School for grades 9–12.

There was formerly a school in the borough limits, Oliver Heckman Elementary School. The facility was built in 1966, and it closed in August 2016. In 2023 the district board of trustees agreed to sell the building for $3,200,000.

Cairn University is located just south of Langhorne Borough in Langhorne Manor and Middletown Township.

== Transportation ==
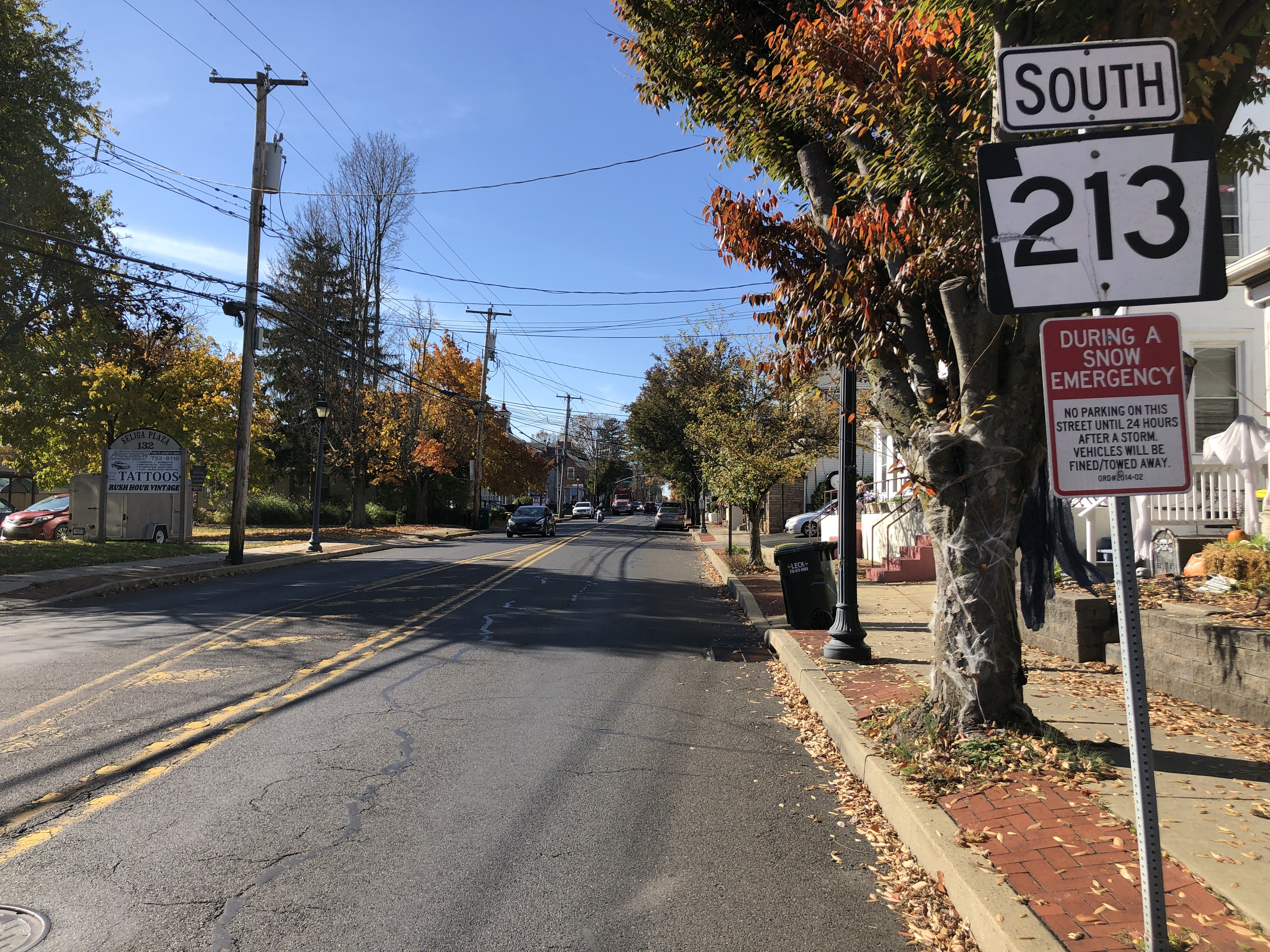
PA 213 southbound in Langhorne

As of 2007 there were 6.19 miles (9.96 km) of public roads in Langhorne, of which 3.50 miles (5.63 km) were maintained by the Pennsylvania Department of Transportation (PennDOT) and 2.69 miles (4.33 km) were maintained by the borough.

Pennsylvania Route 213 and Pennsylvania Route 413 both pass through Langhorne. PA 213 follows a southwest–northeast alignment along Maple Avenue, while PA 413 follows a southeast–northwest alignment along Pine Street.

SEPTA provides bus service to Langhorne along City Bus Route 14, which runs between the Frankford Transportation Center in Northeast Philadelphia and the Oxford Valley Mall, and Suburban Bus Route 130, which runs between Frankford Avenue and Knights Road in Northeast Philadelphia and Bucks County Community College in Newtown. Langhorne station, formerly known as Penndel station, is a station on SEPTA Regional Rail's West Trenton Line located south of Langhorne in Langhorne Manor.

== Climate ==
According to the Köppen climate classification system, Langhorne has a Hot-summer, Humid continental climate (Dfa). Dfa climates are characterized by at least one month having an average mean temperature ≤ 32.0 °F (0.0 °C), at least four months with an average mean temperature ≥ 50.0 °F (10.0 °C), at least one month with an average mean temperature ≥ 71.6 °F (22.0 °C) and no significant precipitation difference between seasons. Although most summer days are slightly humid in Langhorne, episodes of heat and high humidity can occur with heat index values > 107 °F (42 °C). Since 1981, the highest air temperature was 102.8 °F (39.3 °C) on July 22, 2011, and the highest daily average mean dew point was 75.4 °F (24.1 °C) on August 13, 2016. The average wettest month is July which corresponds with the annual peak in thunderstorm activity. Since 1981, the wettest calendar day was 6.65 inches (169 mm) on August 27, 2011. During the winter months, the average annual extreme minimum air temperature is 0.8 °F (−17.3 °C). Since 1981, the coldest air temperature was −9.9 °F (−23.3 °C) on January 22, 1984. Episodes of extreme cold and wind can occur with wind chill values < −10 °F (−23 °C). The average annual snowfall (Nov-Apr) is between 24 inches (61 cm) and 30 inches (76 cm). Ice storms and large snowstorms depositing ≥ 12 inches (30 cm) of snow occur once every few years, particularly during nor'easters from December through February.

Climate data for Langhorne, Elevation 200 ft (61 m), 1981-2010 normals, extremes 1981-2018
Month	Jan	Feb	Mar	Apr	May	Jun	Jul	Aug	Sep	Oct	Nov	Dec	Year
Record high °F (°C)	71.5 (21.9)	77.8 (25.4)	87.4 (30.8)	94.5 (34.7)	95.4 (35.2)	96.6 (35.9)	102.8 (39.3)	100.4 (38.0)	98.4 (36.9)	88.4 (31.3)	81.2 (27.3)	75.9 (24.4)	102.8 (39.3)
Mean daily maximum °F (°C)	39.9 (4.4)	43.2 (6.2)	51.4 (10.8)	63.2 (17.3)	72.8 (22.7)	82.0 (27.8)	86.2 (30.1)	84.5 (29.2)	77.7 (25.4)	66.3 (19.1)	55.4 (13.0)	44.3 (6.8)	64.0 (17.8)
Daily mean °F (°C)	31.7 (−0.2)	34.4 (1.3)	41.8 (5.4)	52.5 (11.4)	61.9 (16.6)	71.4 (21.9)	76.0 (24.4)	74.5 (23.6)	67.3 (19.6)	55.7 (13.2)	46.1 (7.8)	36.2 (2.3)	54.2 (12.3)
Mean daily minimum °F (°C)	23.5 (−4.7)	25.5 (−3.6)	32.2 (0.1)	41.7 (5.4)	51.0 (10.6)	60.9 (16.1)	65.9 (18.8)	64.5 (18.1)	56.9 (13.8)	45.1 (7.3)	36.8 (2.7)	28.2 (−2.1)	44.4 (6.9)
Record low °F (°C)	−9.9 (−23.3)	−2.4 (−19.1)	4.1 (−15.5)	18.1 (−7.7)	33.7 (0.9)	42.3 (5.7)	48.5 (9.2)	43.2 (6.2)	36.4 (2.4)	25.4 (−3.7)	12.5 (−10.8)	0.0 (−17.8)	−9.9 (−23.3)
Average precipitation inches (mm)	3.55 (90)	2.76 (70)	4.19 (106)	3.94 (100)	4.31 (109)	4.31 (109)	5.16 (131)	4.34 (110)	4.35 (110)	3.76 (96)	3.57 (91)	4.03 (102)	48.27 (1,226)
Average relative humidity (%)	66.2	62.5	58.2	57.7	62.1	66.1	66.4	68.8	69.8	69.3	67.7	68.1	65.3
Average dew point °F (°C)	21.7 (−5.7)	22.9 (−5.1)	28.2 (−2.1)	38.0 (3.3)	48.8 (9.3)	59.5 (15.3)	64.0 (17.8)	63.6 (17.6)	57.1 (13.9)	45.8 (7.7)	36.0 (2.2)	26.7 (−2.9)	42.8 (6.0)
Source: PRISM

== Ecology ==
According to the A. W. Kuchler U.S. potential natural vegetation types, Langhorne would have a dominant vegetation type of Appalachian Oak (104) with a dominant vegetation form of Eastern Hardwood Forest (25). The plant hardiness zone is 7a with an average annual extreme minimum air temperature of 0.8 °F (−17.3 °C). The spring bloom typically begins by April 7 and fall color usually peaks by November 2.

== Notable people ==
- Ryan Arcidiacono, 2016 NCAA Division I Basketball Tournament champion as a star point guard for Villanova
- Matt and Chris Bahr, former NFL kickers, Neshaminy and Penn State graduates.
- Len Barker, former MLB baseball player, pitched the 10th perfect game in baseball history during the 1981 season as member of Cleveland Indians, Neshaminy High graduate
- Andy Belmont, racing driver
- Chris Cole, professional skateboarder
- Days Away, indie rock band
- Harry G. Frankfurt, 20th century American philosopher
- James Franklin, head coach of Virginia Tech football, attended Neshaminy High School
- Bob Grupp, former NFL football player
- Edward Hicks, born in Attleboro (now Langhorne), devout Quaker and artist, known for his painting The Peaceable Kingdom
- Marvin Keller, Pennsylvania State Representative and Senator
- Nolan Jones, MLB outfielder for the Cleveland Guardians.
- Larry McCoy, racing driver
- David M. O'Connell, bishop
- Bill O'Neill, professional bowler, 15-time PBA Tour titleist and PBA Hall of Famer
- Patricia Quinn, actress
- Langhorne Slim, folk rock singer
- Catie Turner, singer
- Colin Frangicetto, Guitarist for Circa Survive
