= Charles Howland-William H. Chase House =

Historic house in New York, United States

- U.S. National Register of Historic Places
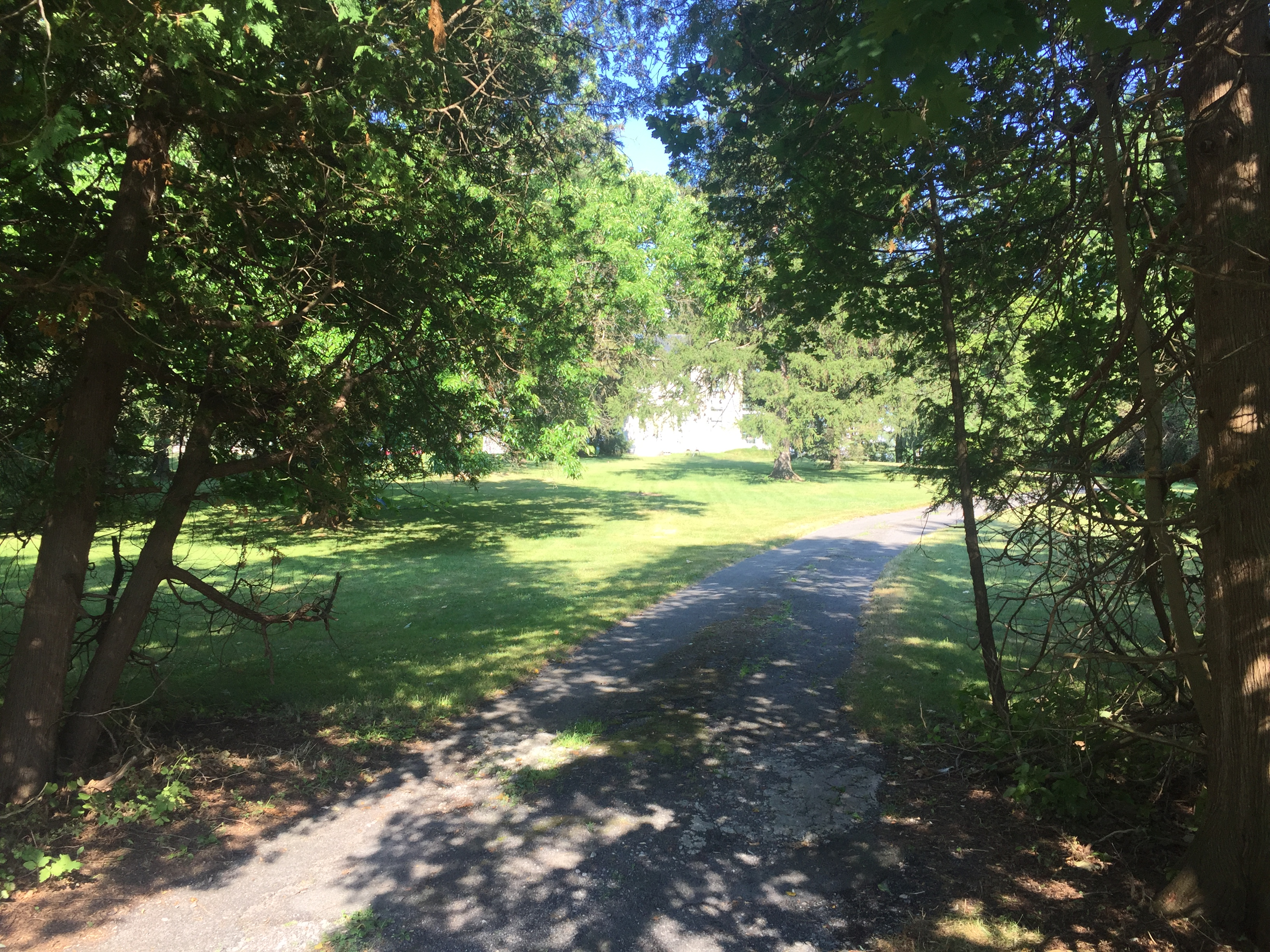
- House in 2022

- Location within New York Location within the United States
- Location: 188 Cayuga St., Union Springs, New York
- Coordinates: 42.84408°N 76.68999°W
- Area: 8 acres (3.2 ha)
- Built: 1840
- Architectural style: Greek Revival
- NRHP reference No.: 04001456
- Added to NRHP: January 5, 2005

Charles Howland-William H. Chase House is a historic home located at Union Springs in Cayuga County, New York. It was built about 1840 and is a remarkably intact two-story, five-bay, center-hall limestone dwelling in the Greek Revival style. Attached to the main block is a large two-story rear wing creating an L-shaped house. Also on the property is a stone barn, stone shed, and stone smokehouse.

It was listed on the National Register of Historic Places in 2005.

The house is set back from Cayuga Street (New York State Route 90).
