= Peter Yawger House =

Historic house in New York, United States

- U.S. National Register of Historic Places
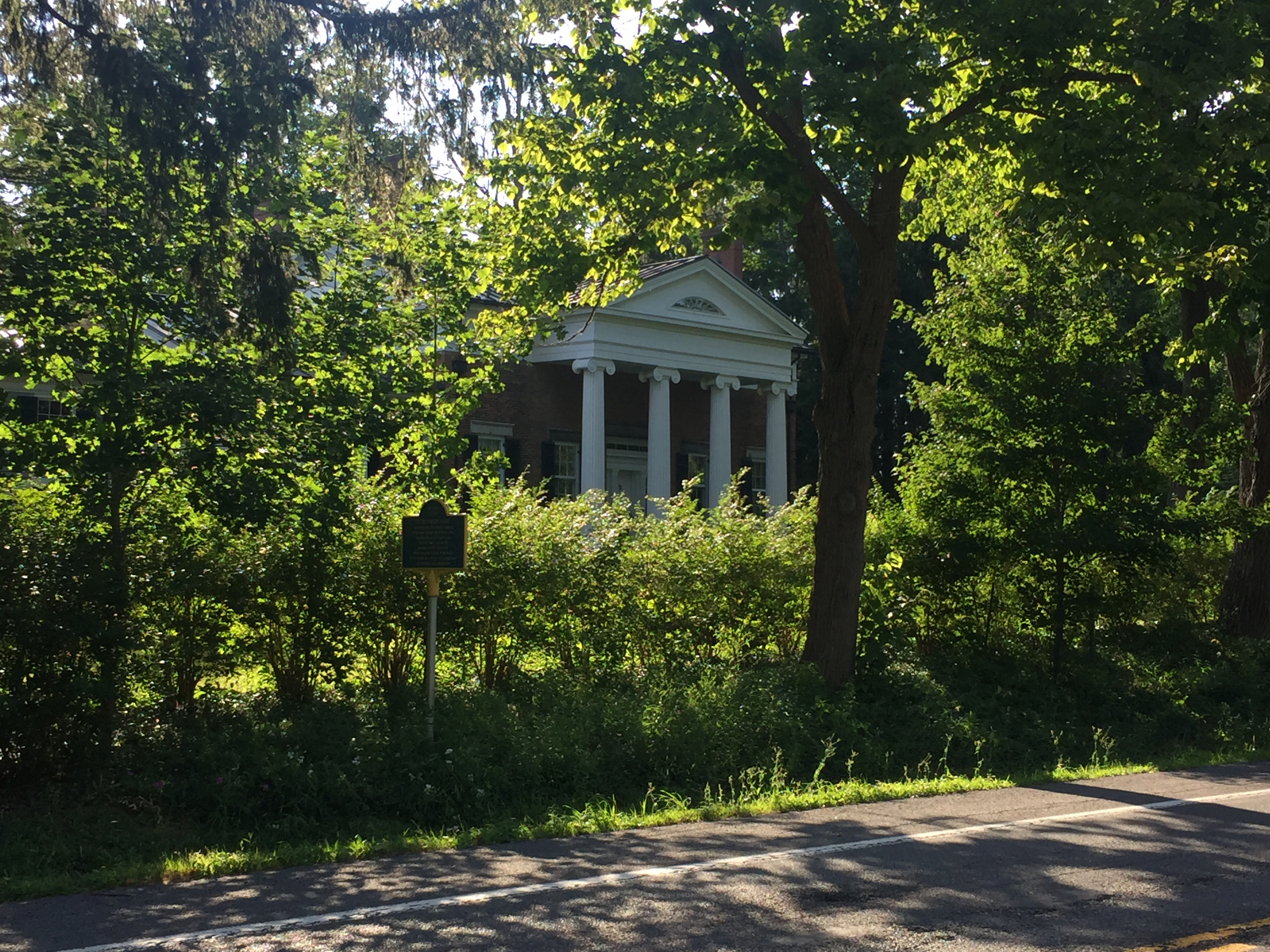

- Location within New York Location within the United States
- Location: NY-90, Cayuga County, north of Union Springs, New York
- Coordinates: 42.89026°N 76.70681°W
- Area: 7 acres (2.8 ha)
- Built: 1838–1840
- Architectural style: Greek Revival
- NRHP reference No.: 04000283
- Added to NRHP: April 15, 2004

Peter Yawger House is a historic home located at Union Springs in Cayuga County, New York. It was built in 1838–1840 in the Greek Revival style on the east shore of Cayuga Lake. It consists of a 1 1/2-story, five-by-three-bay, brick gable-roofed main block, with a 1-story, gable-roofed kitchen wing. The front portico is supported by four massive fluted Ionic columns.

The property spans from Cayuga Lake shore to New York State Route 90.

It was listed on the National Register of Historic Places in 2004.
