= Langhorne Historic District =

Historic district in Pennsylvania, United States

- U.S. National Register of Historic Places
- U.S. Historic district
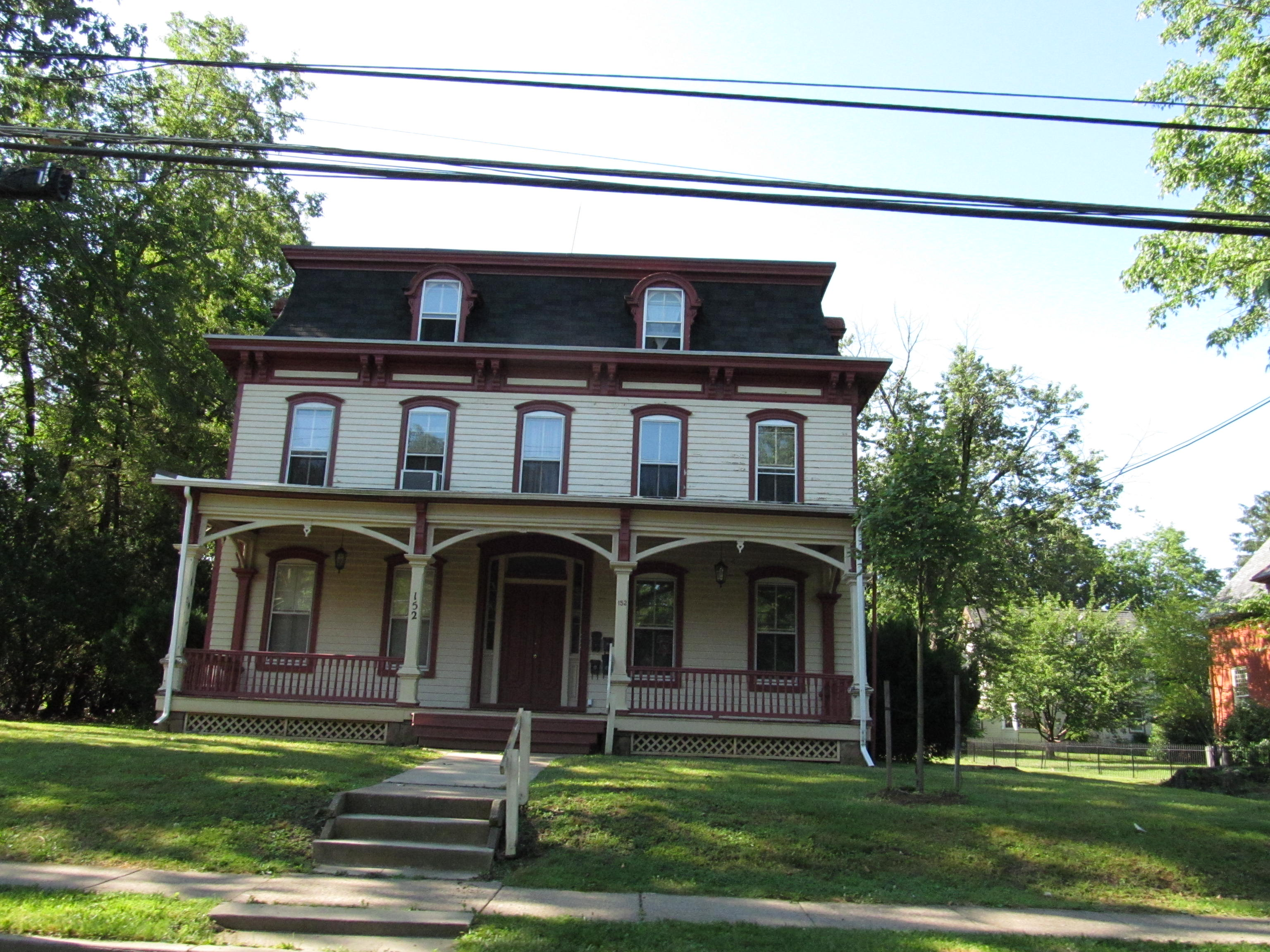
- A house in Langhorne Historic District, June, 2012

- Location within Pennsylvania Location within the United States
- Location: Summit and Marshall Avenues, Pine Street, Richardson Avenue, and Green Street, Langhorne, Pennsylvania
- Coordinates: 40°10′33″N 74°55′16″W
- Area: 185 acres (75 ha)
- Architect: Multiple
- Architectural style: Bungalow/craftsman, Late Victorian, Federal
- NRHP reference No.: 87001993
- Added to NRHP: November 20, 1987

The Langhorne Historic District, also known as "Attleborough," is a national historic district that is located in Langhorne, Bucks County, Pennsylvania.

It was added to the National Register of Historic Places in 1986.

== History and architectural features ==
This district includes one contributing site and 252 contributing buildings that are located in the borough of Langhorne. It is a principally residential district with dwellings representative of the vernacular Federal, Late Victorian, and Bungalow/craftsman styles, which were built between 1738 and 1937, with the majority constructed between 1850 and 1937. The residences are characterized as two-and-one-half-story, stone or frame structures.

Notable buildings include the Jonathan Stackhouse Home (1830), John Phillips Black Home (1848), Allen Mitchell Residence (1868), Rachel Shaw Residence (1870), Henry Lovett House (1891), and Middleton Monthly Meetinghouse (1793). Located in the district and separately listed are the Langhorne Library, Joseph Richardson House, and Tomlinson-Huddleston House.
