= Langhorne Library =

- U.S. National Register of Historic Places
- U.S. Historic district – Contributing property
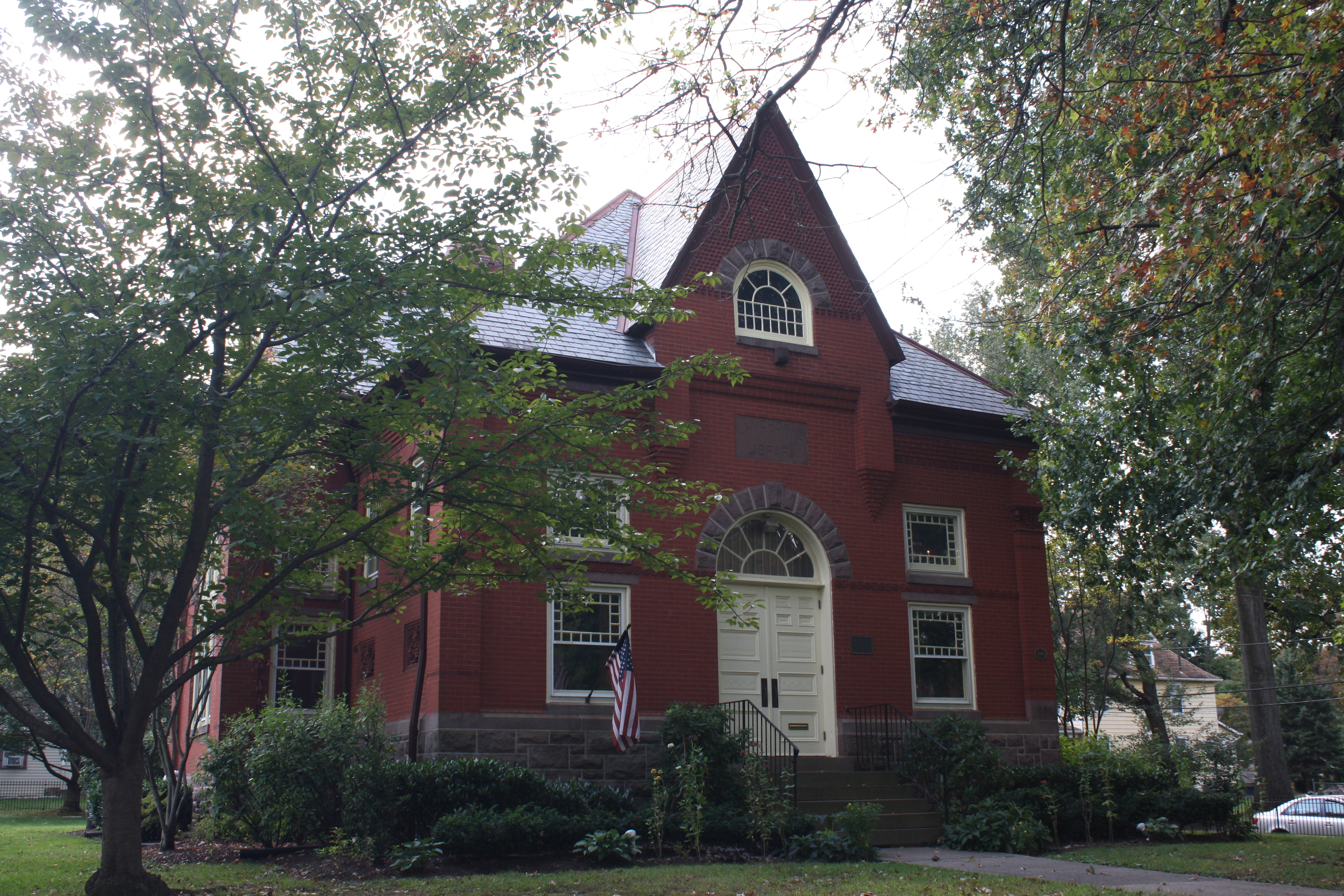
- Langhorne Library. September 2012.

- Location within Pennsylvania Location within the United States
- Location: 160 W. Maple Ave., Langhorne, Pennsylvania
- Coordinates: 40°10′31″N 74°55′24″W
- Area: 0.4 acres (0.16 ha)
- Built: 1888
- Architect: Newton Culver, T. Mellon Rogers
- Architectural style: Late Victorian, Eclectic Victorian
- NRHP reference No.: 86000038
- Added to NRHP: January 9, 1986

The Langhorne Library is an historic library building in Langhorne, Bucks County, Pennsylvania, United States.

It was added to the National Register of Historic Places in 1986, is located in the Langhorne Historic District, which was added to the register in 1987.

== History and architectural features ==
Built in 1888, this historic structure is a cruciform-shaped, one-and-three-quarter-story, brick structure that was designed in a Victorian-Romanesque Revival style. It has a steep, slate covered hipped roof, a narrow cross-gable over the entrance, and smaller gables. The building also features pilasters with terra cotta capitals and terra cotta decorative panels. It housed the public library until the 1970s, after which it became home to the Historic Langhorne Association. It continues to house a local history reference library and museum.
