= Union Springs, New York =

- Village
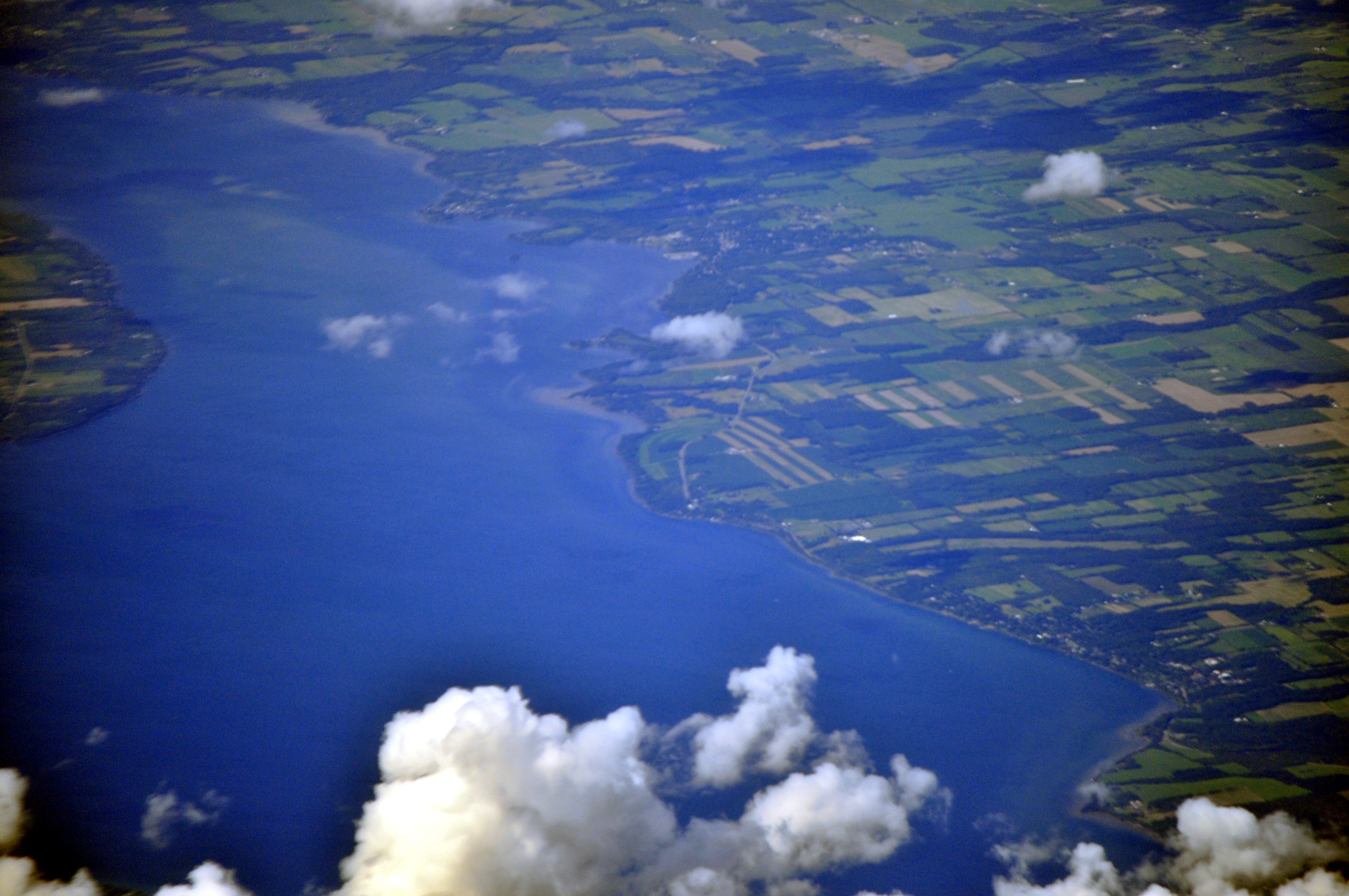
- Aerial view of Union Springs from south by southwest, 2013. The village is on the cove of Cayuga Lake just above the center of the photo.
- Motto: "Beauty by the lake"
- Location within the state of New York
- Coordinates: 42°50′35″N 76°41′35″W
- Country: United States
- State: New York
- County: Cayuga
- Town: Springport

Area
  - Total: 1.76 sq mi (4.57 km^{2})
  - Land: 1.75 sq mi (4.53 km^{2})
  - Water: 0.015 sq mi (0.04 km^{2})
- Elevation: 410 ft (125 m)

Population (2020)
  - Total: 1,075
  - Density: 614.9/sq mi (237.42/km^{2})
- Time zone: UTC-5 (Eastern (EST))
  - Summer (DST): UTC-4 (EDT)
- ZIP code: 13160
- Area code: 315
- FIPS code: 36-76155
- GNIS feature ID: 0968217
- Website: unionspringsny.gov

Union Springs is a village in Cayuga County, New York, United States. As of the 2020 census, Union Springs had a population of 1,075. The name is derived from the mineral springs near the village. Union Springs is in the western part of the town of Springport and is southwest of Auburn.

== History ==
The village is south of the current village of Cayuga and north of the former Cayuga Nation village of Gwau-gwah (Cayuga Castle), which became a Jesuit mission. The native village was a target of the Sullivan Expedition of 1779. After the war, a reservation was established for the Cayuga who returned, but they gave up their land rights before 1800. The village was incorporated in 1848.

Mineral springs near the village made the village an important health spa.

In 2023 the mayor of Union Springs was Bud Shattuck. His term expired in March 2023. Robert Thurston Jr. ran unopposed for a two-year term, and was elected in March that year.

Union Springs is the location of Union Springs Academy - a Seventh-day Adventist boarding school.

The Peter Yawger House was listed on the National Register of Historic Places in 2004. The Almeron Durkee House, Charles Howland-William H. Chase House, and William Richardson House were listed in 2005.

== Geography ==
Union Springs is located at 42°50′35″N 76°41′35″W (42.843046, -76.692996).

According to the United States Census Bureau, the village has a total area of 1.8 square miles (4.7 km^{2}), of which 1.8 square miles (4.7 km^{2}) is land and 0.55% is water.

The village is located on the east shore of Cayuga Lake on New York State Route 90. New York State Route 326 intersects NY-90 north of the village.

Frontenac Island, ceremonially important to the Cayuga, is located near the village in Cayuga Lake. This is the only naturally occurring island in the Finger Lakes. In 1859, nearly one third of the island was removed for use as an embankment for the nearby New York Central Railroad along the east shore of the lake without regard for artifacts. In the mid-20th Century, the island was scientifically excavated for study and display by the Rochester Museum of Arts and Sciences.

== Demographics ==
Historical population
Census	Pop.	Note	%±
1870	1,150		—
1880	1,210		5.2%
1890	1,066		−11.9%
1900	994		−6.8%
1910	798		−19.7%
1920	642		−19.5%
1930	794		23.7%
1940	905		14.0%
1950	957		5.7%
1960	1,066		11.4%
1970	1,183		11.0%
1980	1,201		1.5%
1990	1,142		−4.9%
2000	1,074		−6.0%
2010	1,197		11.5%
2020	1,075		−10.2%
U.S. Decennial Census

As of the census of 2000, there were 1,074 people, 429 households, and 293 families residing in the village. The population density was 597.0 inhabitants per square mile (230.5/km^{2}). There were 486 housing units at an average density of 270.1 per square mile (104.3/km^{2}). The racial makeup of the village was 97.77% White, 1.21% African American, 0.19% Native American, 0.19% Asian, and 0.65% from two or more races. Hispanic or Latino of any race were 0.65% of the population

There were 429 households, out of which 30.8% had children under the age of 18 living with them, 57.1% were married couples living together, 7.7% had a female householder with no husband present, and 31.5% were non-families. 25.9% of all households were made up of individuals, and 14.2% had someone living alone who was 65 years of age or older. The average household size was 2.50 and the average family size was 3.02.

In the village, the population was spread out, with 26.0% under the age of 18, 5.8% from 18 to 24, 26.7% from 25 to 44, 24.3% from 45 to 64, and 17.2% who were 65 years of age or older. The median age was 40 years. For every 100 females, there were 92.5 males. For every 100 females age 18 and over, there were 94.9 males.

The median income for a household in the village was $42,778, and the median income for a family was $49,667. Males had a median income of $31,917 versus $23,750 for females. The per capita income for the village was $18,783. About 5.2% of families and 6.8% of the population were below the poverty line, including 4.2% of those under age 18 and 13.8% of those age 65 or over.

== Education ==
It is in the Union Springs Central School District.
