= Dr. S. O. Richardson House =

Historic house in Massachusetts, United States

- U.S. National Register of Historic Places
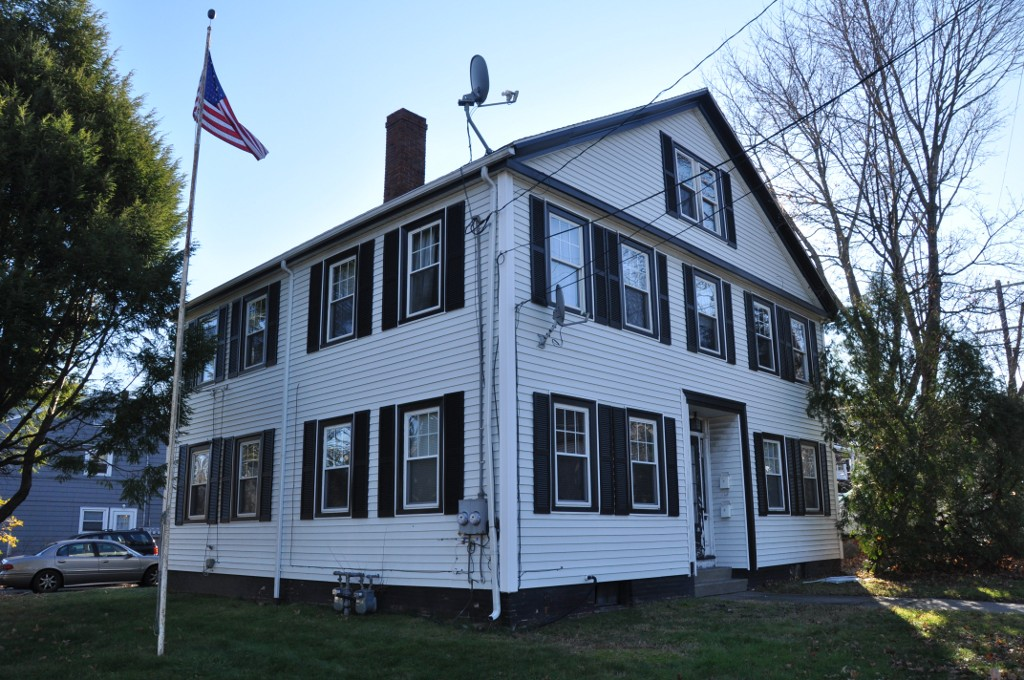

- Location within Massachusetts Location within the United States
- Location: 694 Main St., Wakefield, Massachusetts
- Coordinates: 42°29′43″N 71°4′9″W
- Area: less than one acre
- Built: 1837
- Architectural style: Greek Revival
- MPS: Wakefield MRA
- NRHP reference No.: 89000696
- Added to NRHP: July 6, 1989

The Dr. S. O. Richardson House is a historic house at 694 Main Street in Wakefield, Massachusetts, United States. Built in the late 1830s, this wood-frame house is one of the finest Greek Revival houses in Wakefield, and was the home of Dr. Solon O. Richardson, a locally prominent physician and real estate developer. The house was listed on the National Register of Historic Places in 1989.

== Description and history ==
The Richardson House is located at the southeast corner of Main and Summer Streets in northern Wakefield, just east of Lake Quannapowitt. It is a 2 1/2-story wood-frame structure, with Greek Revival styling, distinctive for being five bays wide while presenting a gabled roof end to the street. It has a particularly elaborate Greek Revival entry treatment, deeply recessed, with flanking sidelight windows and fluted pilasters, and a transom window above. The front gable has a window at its center, which is topped by a dummy fanlight.

This house was probably built in the late 1830s, and originally stood just off Main Street near where Richardson Street now runs. It was built by Dr. Solon O. Richardson, son of the inventor of Richardson's Sherry Wine Bitters, and is where his son, also named Solon, was born in 1841. Solon O. Richardson Sr. was also trained as a doctor, but he continued his father's successful business, developing new packaging and marketing for the product, which made him quite wealthy. He was active in the town's civic life, founding Richardson's Light Guard, a militia company, in 1851.

The house was moved in the late 19th century by Solon Jr. to make way for development of Richardson Street on part of the family estate.

== See also ==
- National Register of Historic Places listings in Wakefield, Massachusetts
- National Register of Historic Places listings in Middlesex County, Massachusetts
