= William Richardson House =

Historic house in New York, United States

- U.S. National Register of Historic Places
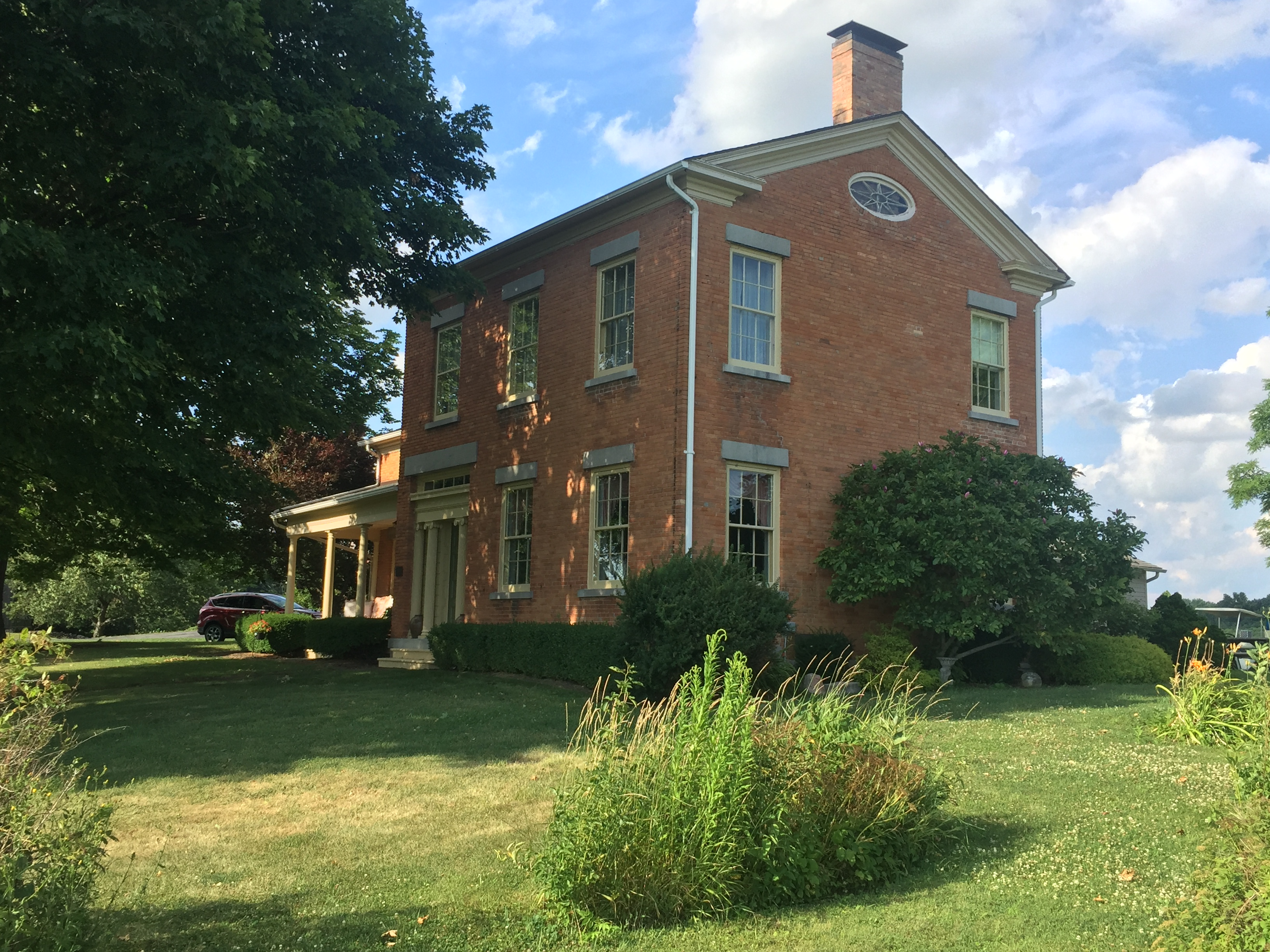
- House in 2022

- Location within New York Location within the United States
- Location: 5494 Cross Road, near Union Springs, New York
- Coordinates: 42.88410°N 76.68212°W
- Area: 80 acres (32 ha)
- Built: 1840
- Architectural style: Greek Revival
- NRHP reference No.: 05000160
- Added to NRHP: March 15, 2005

William Richardson House is a historic home located at Union Springs in Cayuga County, New York. It was built about 1830 and is a remarkably intact late Federal / early Greek Revival–style farmhouse. It is a 2-story, three-bay brick dwelling main block with a 1 1/2-story side ell and 1 1/2-story rear wing. Also on the property are four late-19th-century / early-20th-century barns.

It was listed on the National Register of Historic Places in 2005.

Village history states that William Richardson came from Chester County, PA in 1791 and married Elizabeth Thompson. Her father is noted as Thomas Thompson from Juniata in Western Pennsylvania. William died in Levanna, NY in 1823.

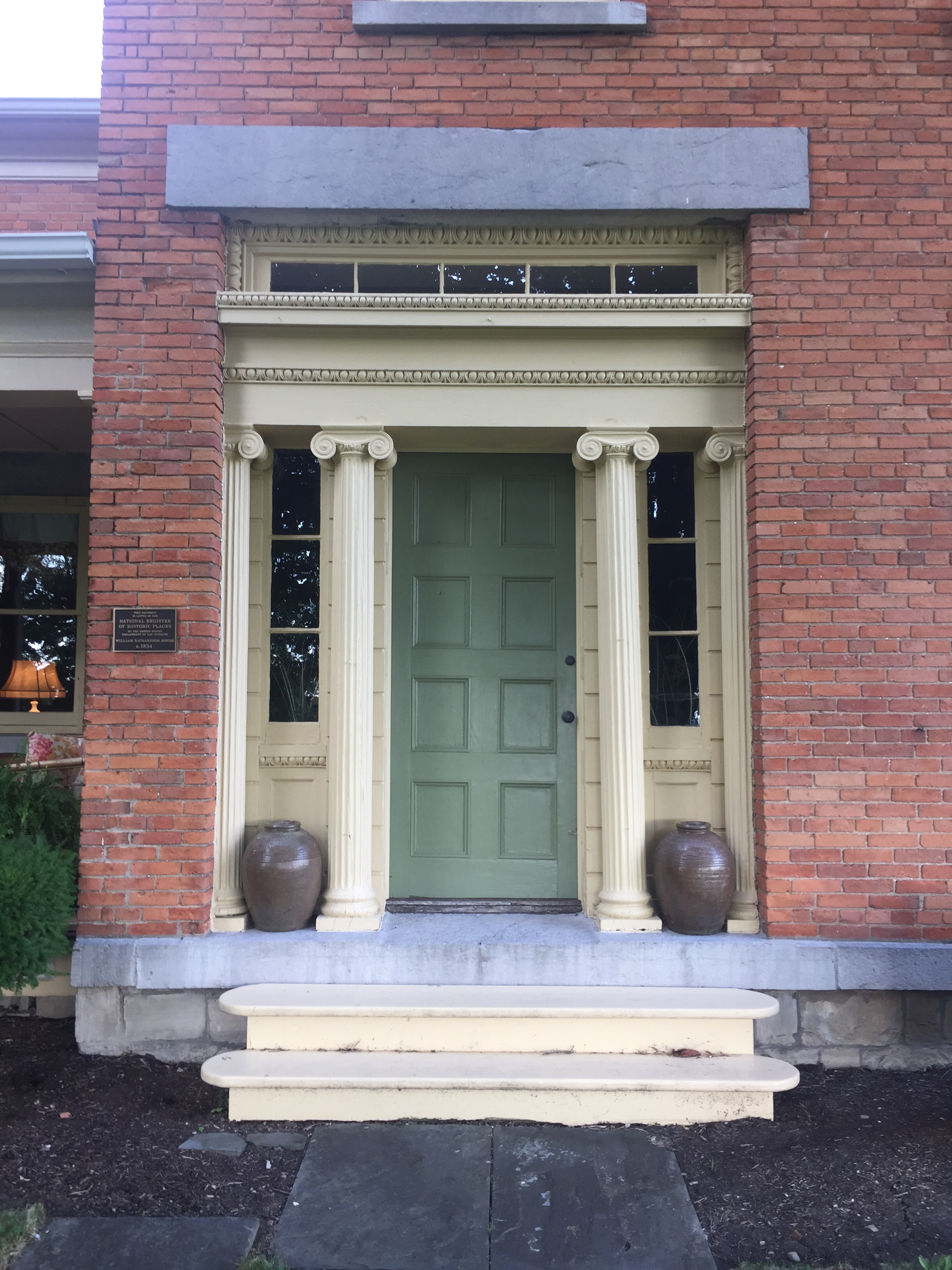

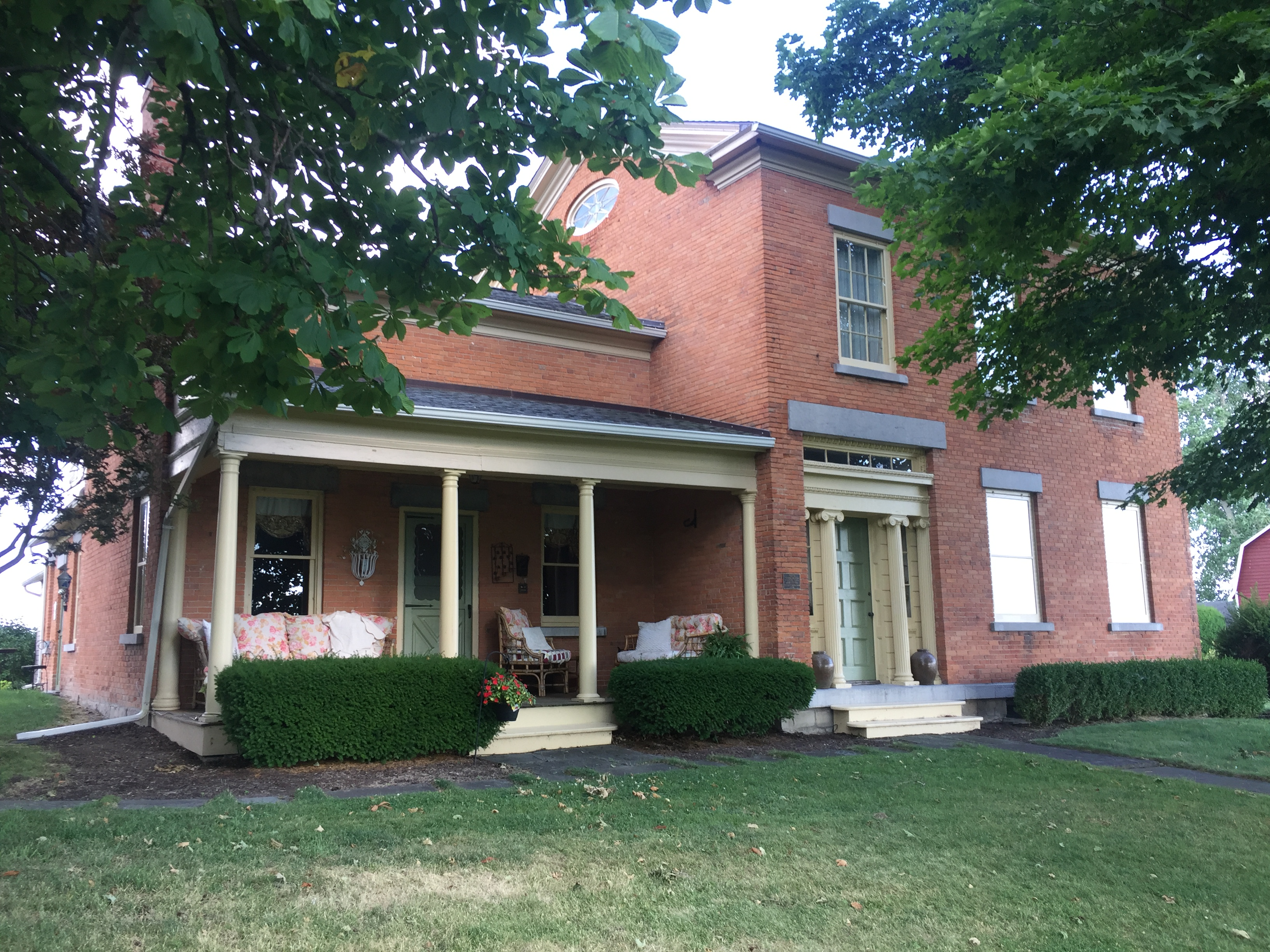

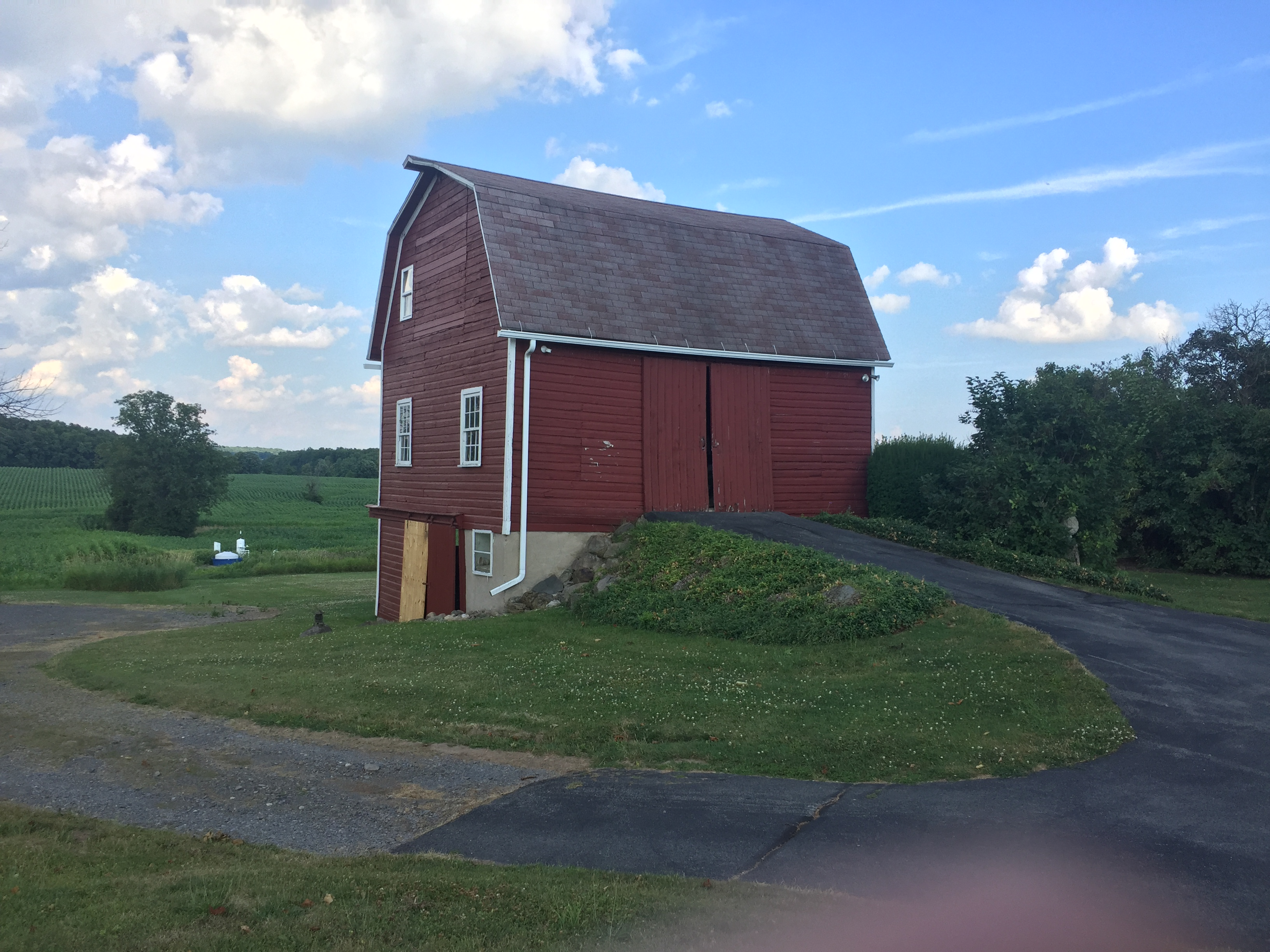

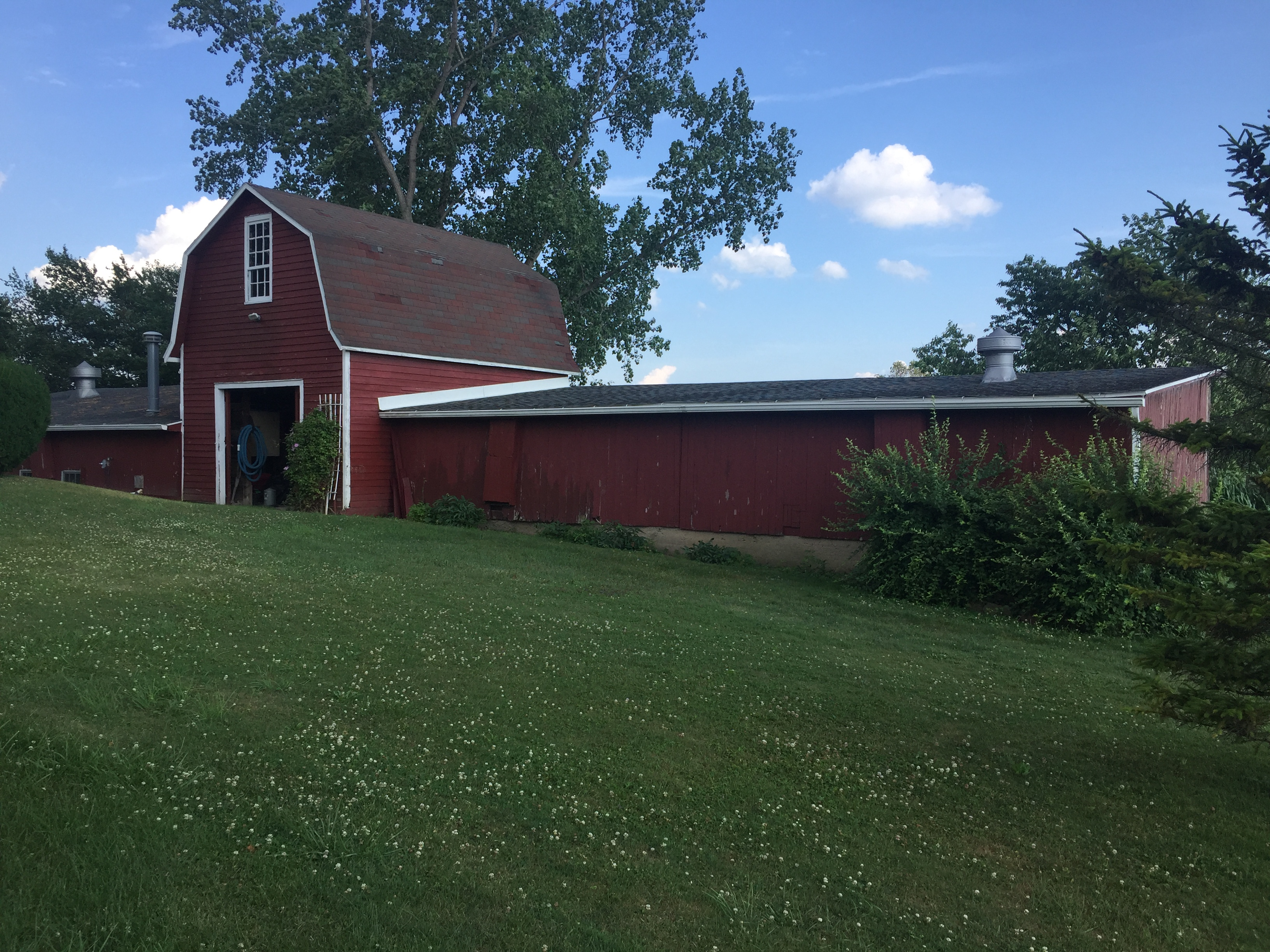

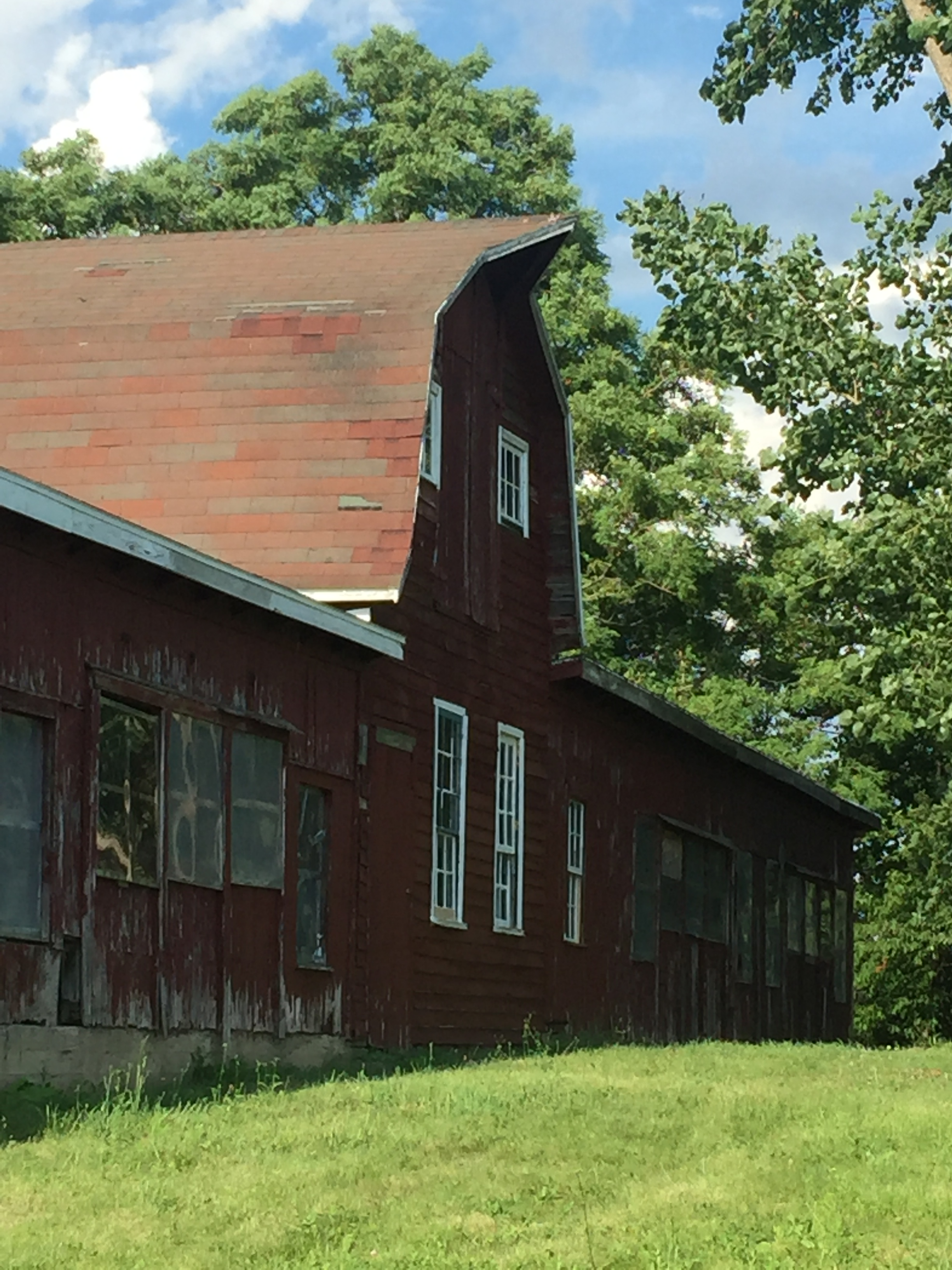
