= Nathaniel Richardson House =

Historic house in Connecticut

- U.S. National Register of Historic Places
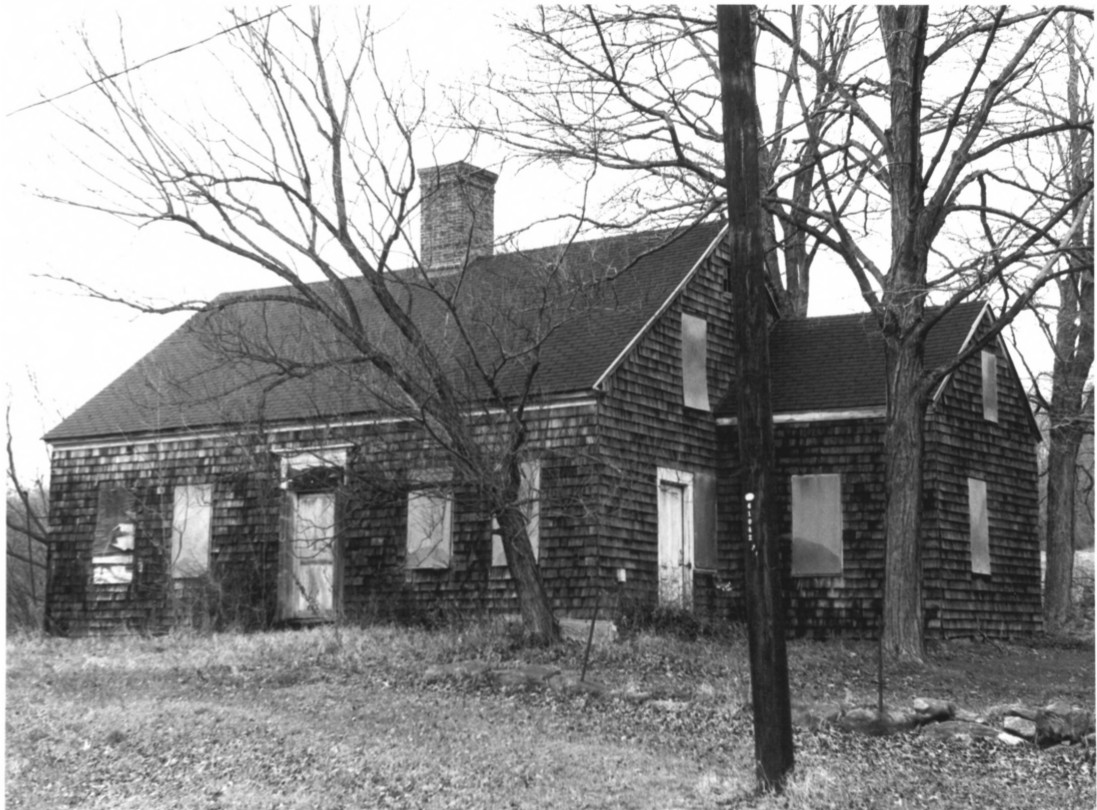
- The house in 1976

- Location within Connecticut Location within the United States
- Location: Kelly Road, Middlebury, Connecticut
- Coordinates: 41°32′40″N 73°05′37″W
- Area: 2 acres (0.81 ha)
- Built: 1800
- NRHP reference No.: 77001405
- Added to NRHP: September 19, 1977

The Nathaniel Richardson House was a historic house on Kelly Road in Middlebury, Connecticut. With an estimated construction date of 1800, it was one of the community's oldest houses. It was listed on the National Register of Historic Places in 1977. It appears to have either been demolished or moved; it is no longer standing at its listed location.

== Description and history ==
The Nathaniel Richardson House stood in Eastern Middlebury, on the North Side of Kelly Road opposite the Memorial Middle School. It was a 1 1/2-story timber-framed structure, with a gabled roof, central brick chimney, and exterior finished in wooden shingles. Its main facade was five bays wide, with a center entrance flanked by sash windows. A one-room single-story ell extended to the right of the main block. The roof had a shallow overhand in the front, with a line of dentil molding. The main entrance was flanked by wooden pilasters rising to molded capitals, and there was a transom window with four elliptical lights above the door. The interior had similar woodwork of good quality in the main parlor chamber, and also featured wide wooden floorboards.

The house's construction date was of some uncertainty. The Richardson family, who settled this area in the early 18th century, were farmers. Local lore states that Nathaniel Richardson entertained French troops here during the American Revolutionary War, suggesting that a house was standing at or near this site in the early 1780s. Stylistic and architectural evidence suggests that this house was more likely built later, around 1800 by his son Ebenezer. The wing is possibly of older construction, and may have been attached to an earlier structure. At the time of the building's National Register listing in 1977 it was in poor condition.

== See also ==
- National Register of Historic Places listings in New Haven County, Connecticut
