= Joseph Richardson House (Langhorne Borough, Pennsylvania) =

Historic house in Pennsylvania, United States

- U.S. National Register of Historic Places
- U.S. Historic district – Contributing property
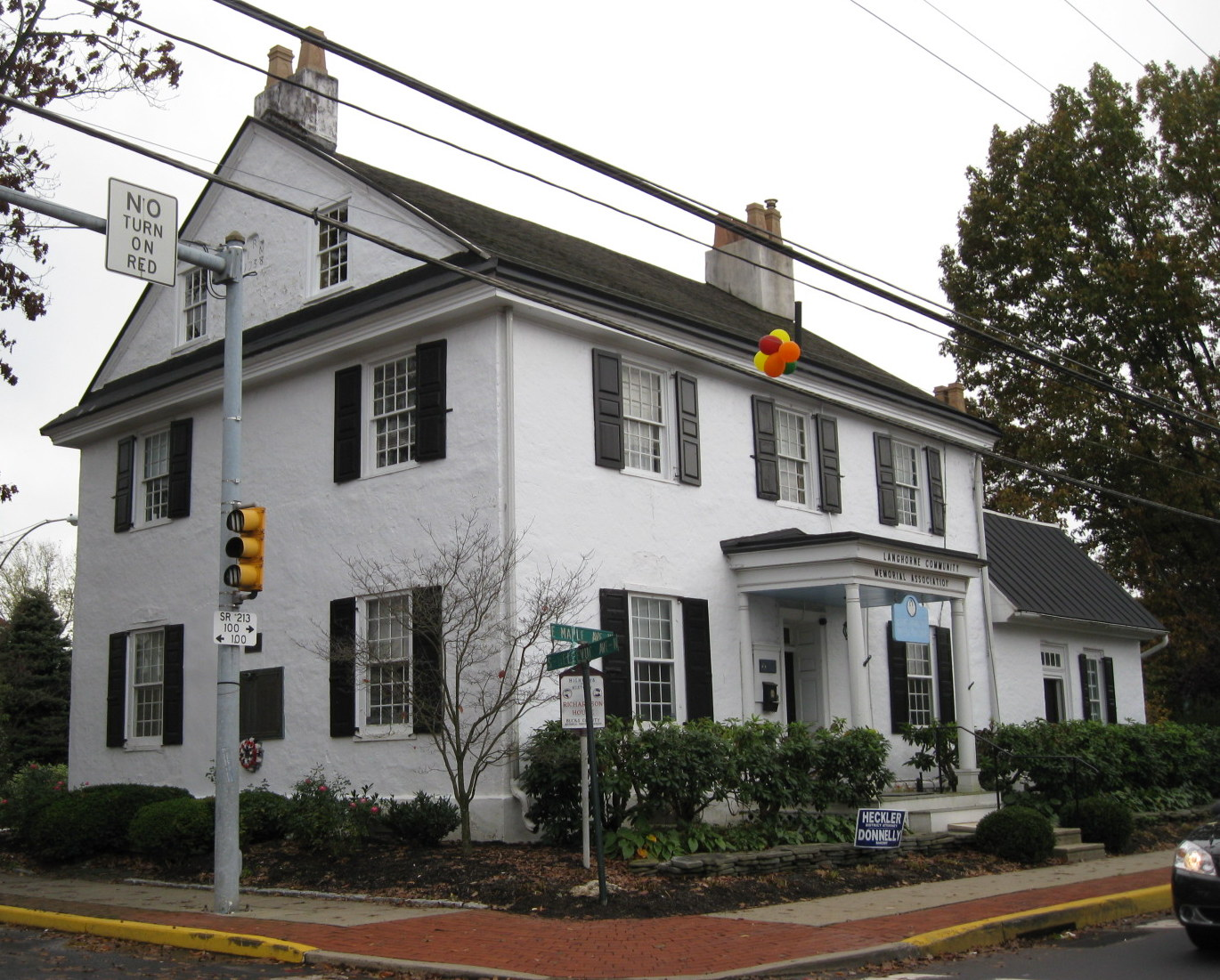
- Joseph Richardson House, November 2009

- Location within Pennsylvania Location within the United States
- Location: Bellevue and Maple Aves., Langhorne Borough, Pennsylvania
- Coordinates: 40°10′33″N 74°55′12″W
- Area: 0.6 acres (0.24 ha)
- Built: 1738
- NRHP reference No.: 85003159
- Added to NRHP: December 26, 1985

The Joseph Richardson House, also known as the Langhorne Community Memorial Building, is a historic American home that is located in Langhorne Borough, Bucks County, Pennsylvania.

Located in the Langhorne Historic District, it was added to the National Register of Historic Places in 1985.

== History and architectural features ==
Built in 1738, this historic structure is a 2 1/2-story, stuccoed, stone dwelling with a gable roof. It has an original 1 1/2-story, gambrel-roofed, stone addition, is one of the oldest structures in Bucks County and was home to the Richardson family from its construction into the 20th century. In 1919, the Richardson family sold the home and it was acquired as a memorial to those who served in World War I.
