= Deacon Abijah Richardson House =

Historic house in New Hampshire, United States

- U.S. National Register of Historic Places
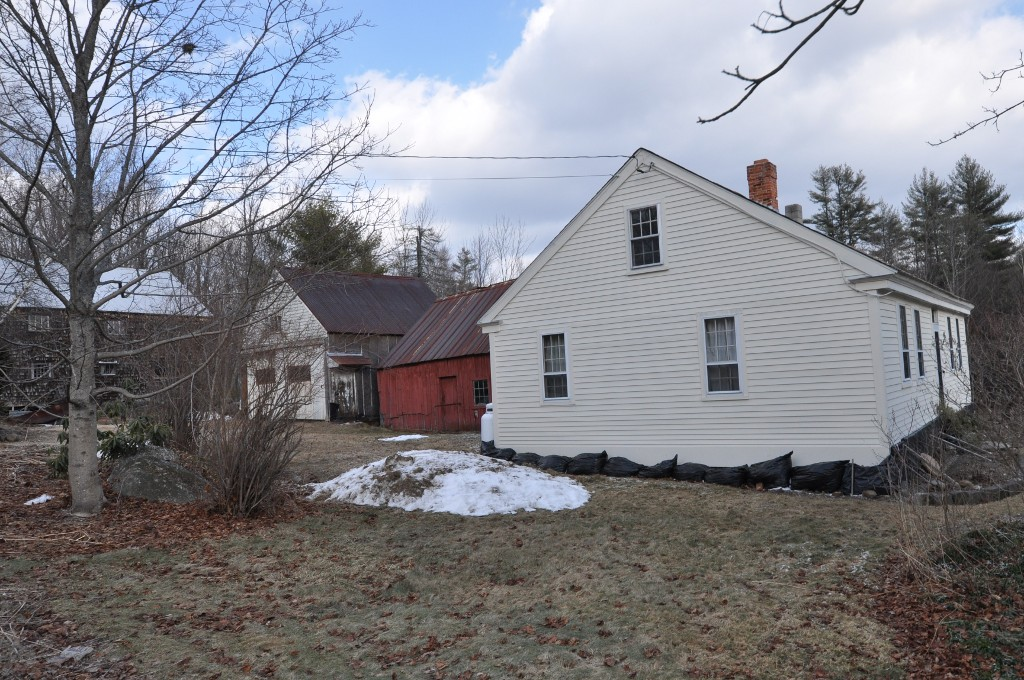

- Location within New Hampshire Location within the United States
- Location: 334 Hancock Rd., Dublin, New Hampshire
- Coordinates: 42°54′42″N 72°0′4″W
- Area: 2 acres (0.81 ha)
- Built: 1818
- Built by: Richardson, A., Jr.
- Architectural style: Cape Colonial
- MPS: Dublin MRA
- NRHP reference No.: 83004071
- Added to NRHP: December 15, 1983

The Deacon Abijah Richardson House is a historic house at 334 Hancock Road in Dublin, New Hampshire. Built in 1818 by the son of an early settler, it is a well-preserved example of an early 19th-century Cape-style farmhouse. It was listed on the National Register of Historic Places in 1983.

== Description and history ==
The Deacon Abijah Richardson House stands in a rural setting in eastern Dublin, on the east side of Hancock Road (New Hampshire Route 137), about 0.2 miles (0.32 km) north of its junction with Spring Road. It is a 1 1/2-story timber-frame structure, with a gabled roof and clapboarded exterior. It has a five-bay facade with a center entry, and a narrow central chimney that is a replacement of an earlier large one. It is oriented with its main facade facing south (perpendicular to the road), with a 19th-century shed extension extending from the northeast corner. Additional outbuildings include a barn and blacksmith's shop.

The house was built in 1818 by Abijah Richardson, Jr., son of one of Dublin's first settlers, whose house stands across the street a short way to the north. The Richardsons have long been a fixture in this part of Dublin. This house was still in the hands of Richardson descendants in the 1980s.

== See also ==
- John Richardson Homestead
- National Register of Historic Places listings in Cheshire County, New Hampshire
