= Joseph Richardson House (Uxbridge, Massachusetts) =

Historic house in Massachusetts, United States

- U.S. National Register of Historic Places
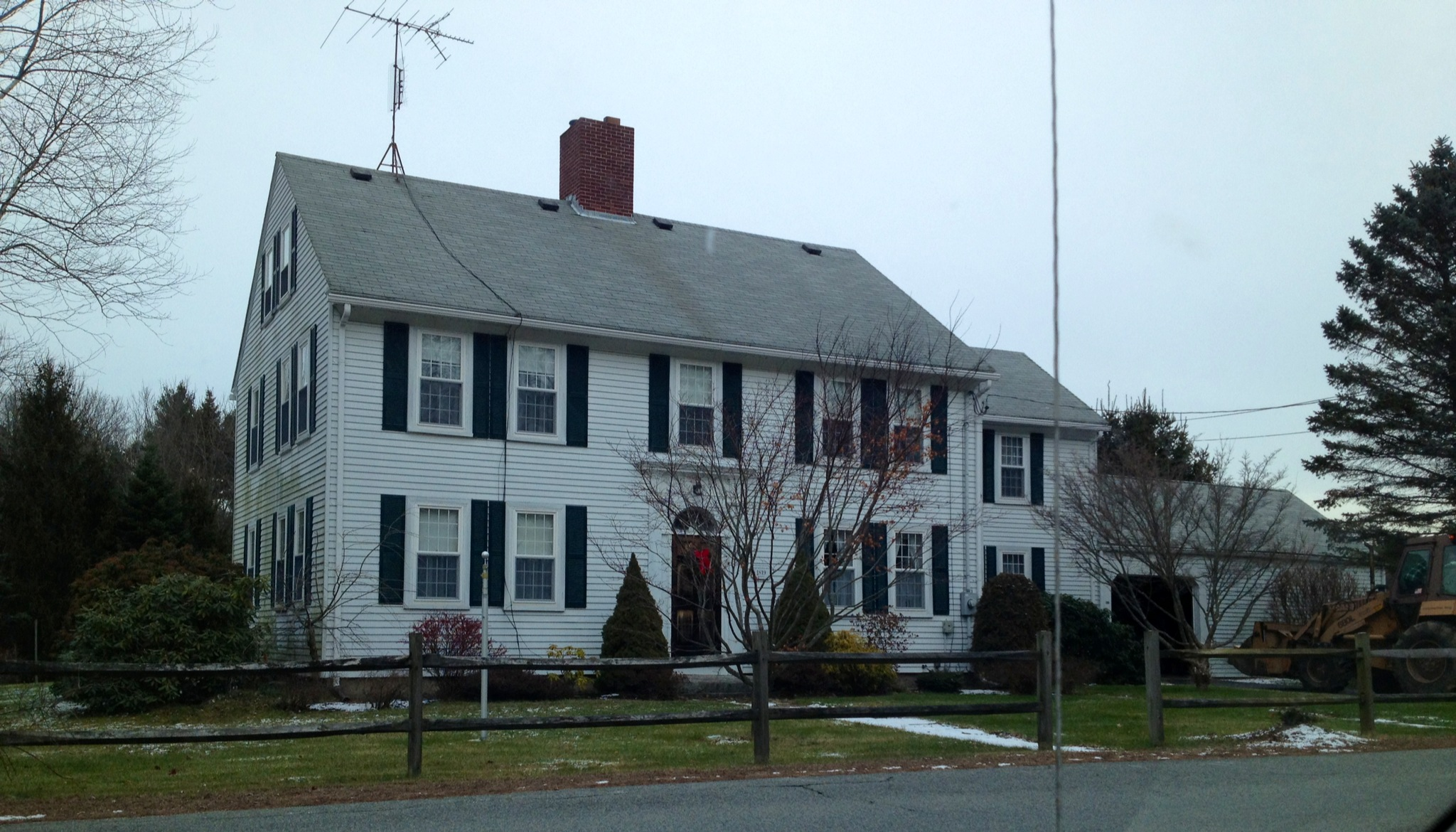

- Location within Massachusetts Location within the United States
- Location: Uxbridge, Massachusetts
- Coordinates: 42°1′47″N 71°40′21″W
- Built: 1819
- Architectural style: Federal
- MPS: Uxbridge MRA
- NRHP reference No.: 83004129
- Added to NRHP: October 7, 1983

The Joseph Richardson House is an historic house at 685 Chocalog Road in Uxbridge, Massachusetts. One of Uxbridge's wealthiest citizens and largest landowners, Joseph Richardson, Jr, lived in this house. He was a farmer and landowner, as well as Selectman of the town. His father was a captain in the French and Indian War. Richardson died of smallpox in 1825 at the age of 41. His descendants still live in the home today, according to the Uxbridge Historical Society.

On October 7, 1983, it was added to the National Register of Historic Places.

== See also ==
- National Register of Historic Places listings in Uxbridge, Massachusetts
