= John Richardson House (Barnstable, Massachusetts) =

Historic house in Massachusetts, United States

- U.S. National Register of Historic Places
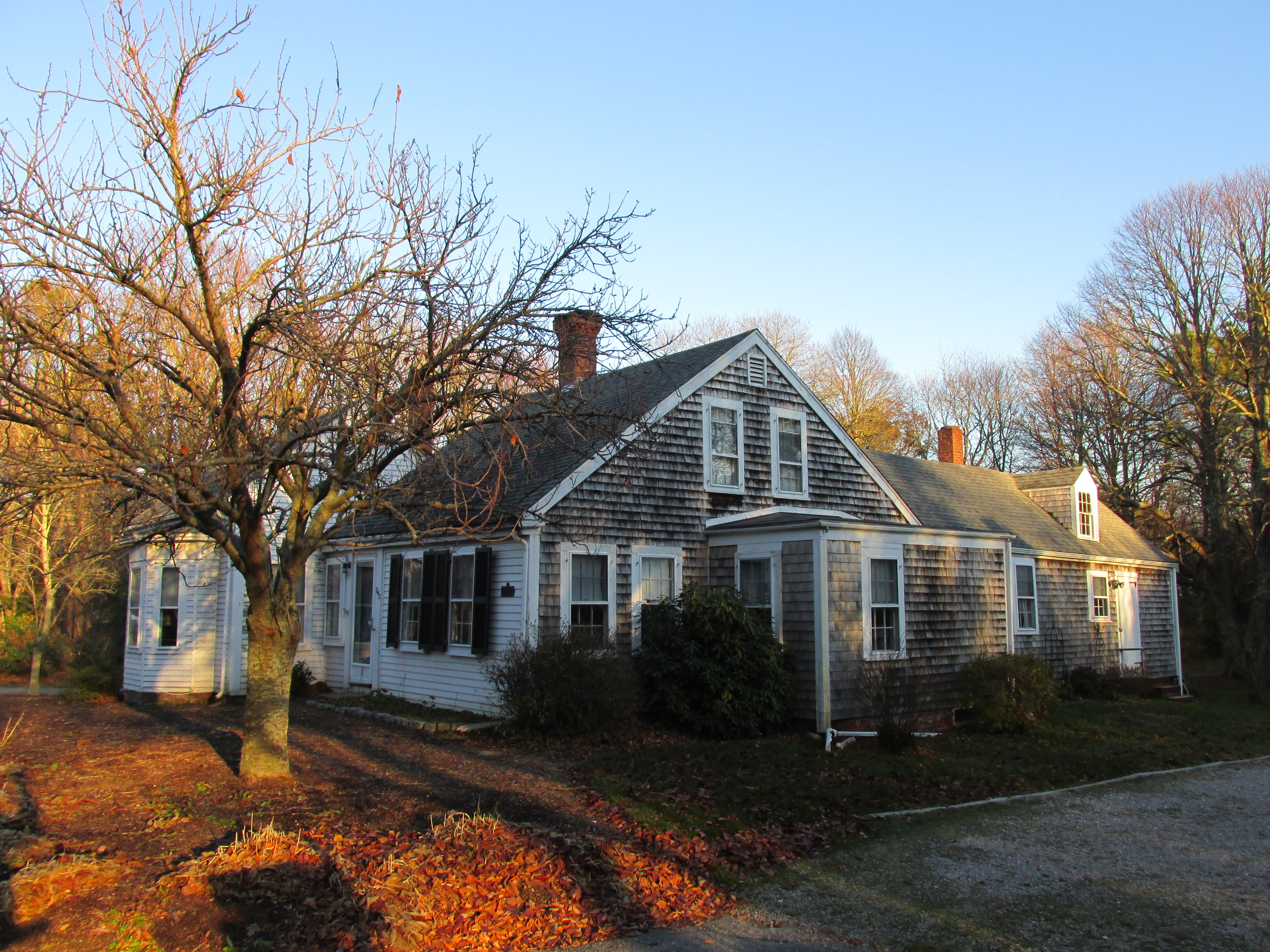

- Location within Cape Cod Location within Massachusetts Location within the United States
- Location: 242 Phinney's Lane, Barnstable, Massachusetts
- Coordinates: 41°39′28″N 70°20′21″W
- Built: 1795
- Architectural style: Federal
- MPS: Barnstable MRA
- NRHP reference No.: 87000281
- Added to NRHP: September 18, 1987

The John Richardson House is a historic house in the Centerville area of Barnstable, Massachusetts. The 1 1/2-story wood-frame Cape style house was built c. 1795 by John Richardson, member of a locally prominent family and the first teacher at the Phinney's Lane School. It is four bays wide (a "3/4 house"), with the main entrance and chimney in the second bay from the left. The house is one of Centerville's older houses, located near the site of its first meetinghouse and cemetery.

The house was listed on the National Register of Historic Places in 1987.

== See also ==
- National Register of Historic Places listings in Barnstable County, Massachusetts
