= Abijah Richardson Sr. Homestead =

Historic house in New Hampshire, United States

- U.S. National Register of Historic Places
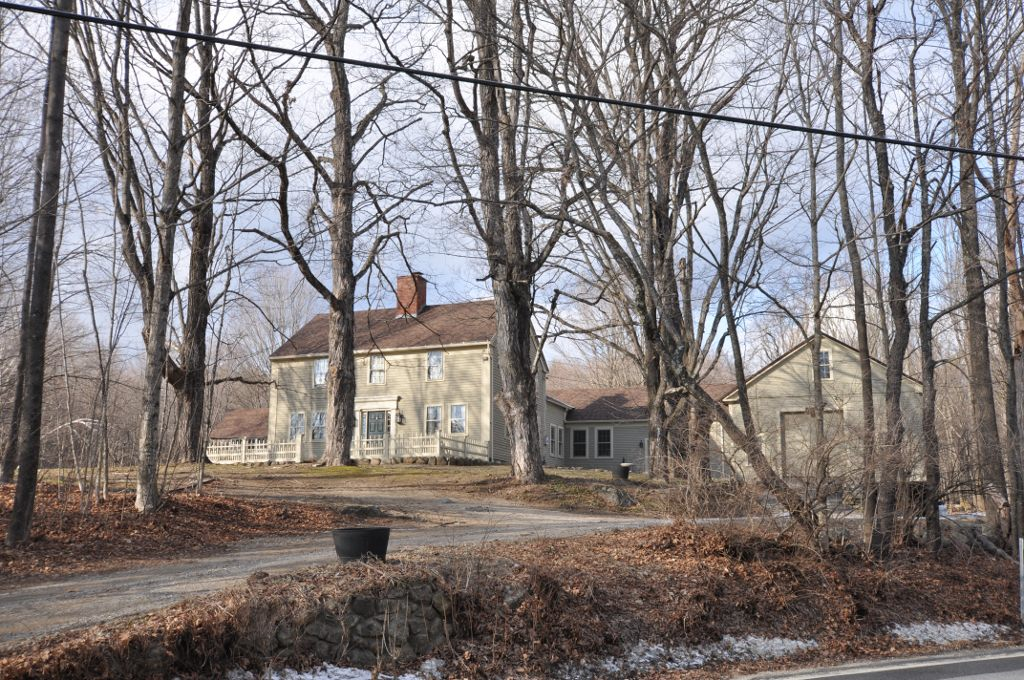

- Location within New Hampshire Location within the United States
- Location: Hancock Rd., Dublin, New Hampshire
- Coordinates: 42°54′46″N 72°0′6″W
- Area: 1.2 acres (0.49 ha)
- Built: 1795
- Architect: Richardson, Abijah
- Architectural style: Early Republic
- MPS: Dublin MRA
- NRHP reference No.: 83004070
- Added to NRHP: December 18, 1983

The Abijah Richardson Sr. Homestead is a historic house at 359 Hancock Road in Dublin, New Hampshire. Built about 1795, it is one of Dublin's oldest houses, built by Abijah Richardson Sr., one of the town's early settlers and progenitor of a locally prominent family. The house was listed on the National Register of Historic Places in 1983.

== Description and history ==
The Abijah Richardson Sr. Homestead is located in a rural setting of northeastern Dublin, on the west side of Hancock Road (New Hampshire Route 137) about 0.2 miles (0.32 km) north of its junction with Spring Street. It is a 2 1/2-story timber-frame structure, with a gabled roof, central chimney, and clapboarded exterior. The main facade has five bays on the first floor and three on the second, arranged symmetrically around the main entrance. It has a broad cornice and simple corner pilasters, suggestive of a 19th-century addition of Greek Revival touches. An ell extends to the rear, connecting the house to a shed and barn that are of late 18th or early 19th-century construction.

The house was built c. 1795 by Abijah Richardson, a veteran of the American Revolutionary War who moved here from Woburn, Massachusetts, first living in a log structure that stood nearby. When built it had basic late Georgian/early Federal styling; the current Greek Revival features were probably added by Richardson's son Malachi. The house was in the Richardson family until 1968. A number of other 19th-century Richardson family properties survive in the area.

== See also ==
- Deacon Abijah Richardson House
- John Richardson Homestead
- National Register of Historic Places listings in Cheshire County, New Hampshire
