= John Richardson Homestead =

Historic house in New Hampshire, United States

- U.S. National Register of Historic Places
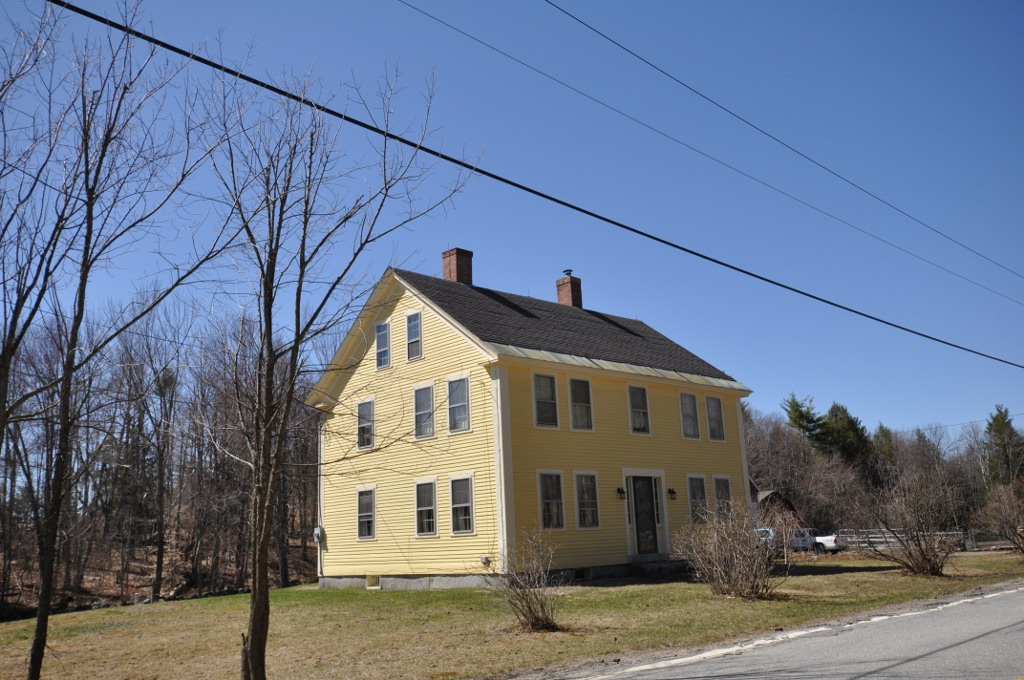

- Location within New Hampshire Location within the United States
- Location: Hancock Rd., Dublin, New Hampshire
- Coordinates: 42°55′0″N 72°0′6″W
- Area: 0.8 acres (0.32 ha)
- Built: 1798
- Architect: Richardson, John
- Architectural style: Early Republic
- MPS: Dublin MRA
- NRHP reference No.: 83004072
- Added to NRHP: December 18, 1983

The John Richardson Homestead is a historic house on Hancock Road in Dublin, New Hampshire, United States. Built about 1798, it is a well-preserved example of a modest Federal period farmhouse. The house was listed on the National Register of Historic Places in 1983.

== Description and history ==
The John Richardson Homestead is located in a rural setting in eastern Dublin, on the west side of Hancock Road (New Hampshire Route 137) north of Spruce Ridge Drive. It is a 2 1/2-story timber-frame structure, with a gabled roof and clapboarded exterior. It is five bays wide and two deep, with sash windows arranged symmetrically around the main entrance. Although the massing is basically Federal, later alterations including corner pilasters and a center entrance with sidelights give it a Greek Revival feel. There are two interior brick chimneys. Attached to the north end of the building is a single-story brick ell, also with a gabled roof. Outbuildings on the property include a three-car garage and barn.

The house was built c. 1798 by John Richardson, whose brother Abijah built his house further down the road on the same lot. The Richardsons, along with the intermarried Eaton family, were a major presence in this part of Dublin in the 19th century.

== See also ==
- Deacon Abijah Richardson House
- National Register of Historic Places listings in Cheshire County, New Hampshire
