= House at 23 Avon Street =

Historic house in Massachusetts, United States

- U.S. National Register of Historic Places
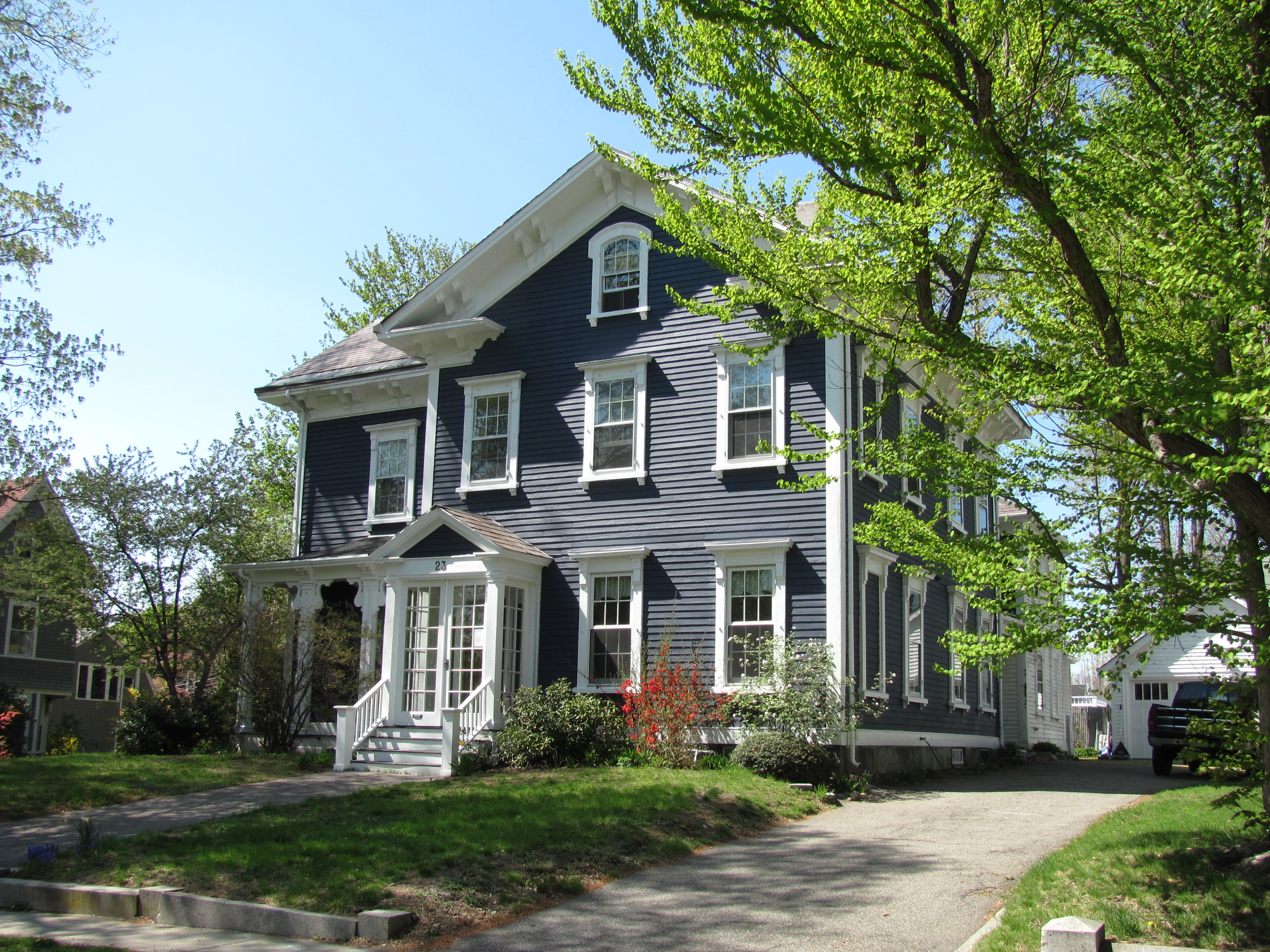
- House at 23 Avon Street

- Location within Massachusetts Location within the United States
- Location: 23 Avon St., Wakefield, Massachusetts
- Coordinates: 42°30′15″N 71°4′26″W
- Area: less than one acre
- Built: 1855
- Architectural style: Italianate
- MPS: Wakefield MRA
- NRHP reference No.: 89000730
- Added to NRHP: July 06, 1989

The House at 23 Avon Street in Wakefield, Massachusetts is one of the town's finest examples of Italianate. It was built about 1855, and was listed on the National Register of Historic Places in 1989.

== Description and history ==
Avon Street is a residential street running east–west between Main Street and North Avenue, both major north–south through streets, which serve the downtown and railroad corridor respectively. Number 23 is a 2 1/2-story clapboarded wood-frame structure with a T-shaped plan, set on a lot fronted by a low granite retaining wall. It has a cross-gabled roof with wide eaves with paired corner brackets, an Italianate hallmark, and windows with corniced lintels and footed sills. The main facade is three bays wide, with the entrance in the left bay, sheltered by an enclosed gable-roof vestibule. A segmented-arch window is set in the gable. A two-story section extends to the left at a recess, and is fronted by a single-story porch with paneled square posts and brackets at the eave. A 20th-century garage stands at the rear of the property.

Avon Street was laid out in 1848 on the former estate of Lemuel Sweetser, a local shoe manufacturer. This house was built about 1855, as part of a trend in which high-quality upper-class housing was built to the west of downtown Wakefield. It is one of the finer examples of high-style Italianate architecture in the town.

23 Avon Street directly neighbors 25 Avon Street, which is also on the National Register of Historic Places.

== See also ==
- House at 25 Avon Street
- National Register of Historic Places listings in Wakefield, Massachusetts
- National Register of Historic Places listings in Middlesex County, Massachusetts
