= House at 25 Avon Street =

Historic house in Massachusetts, United States

- U.S. National Register of Historic Places
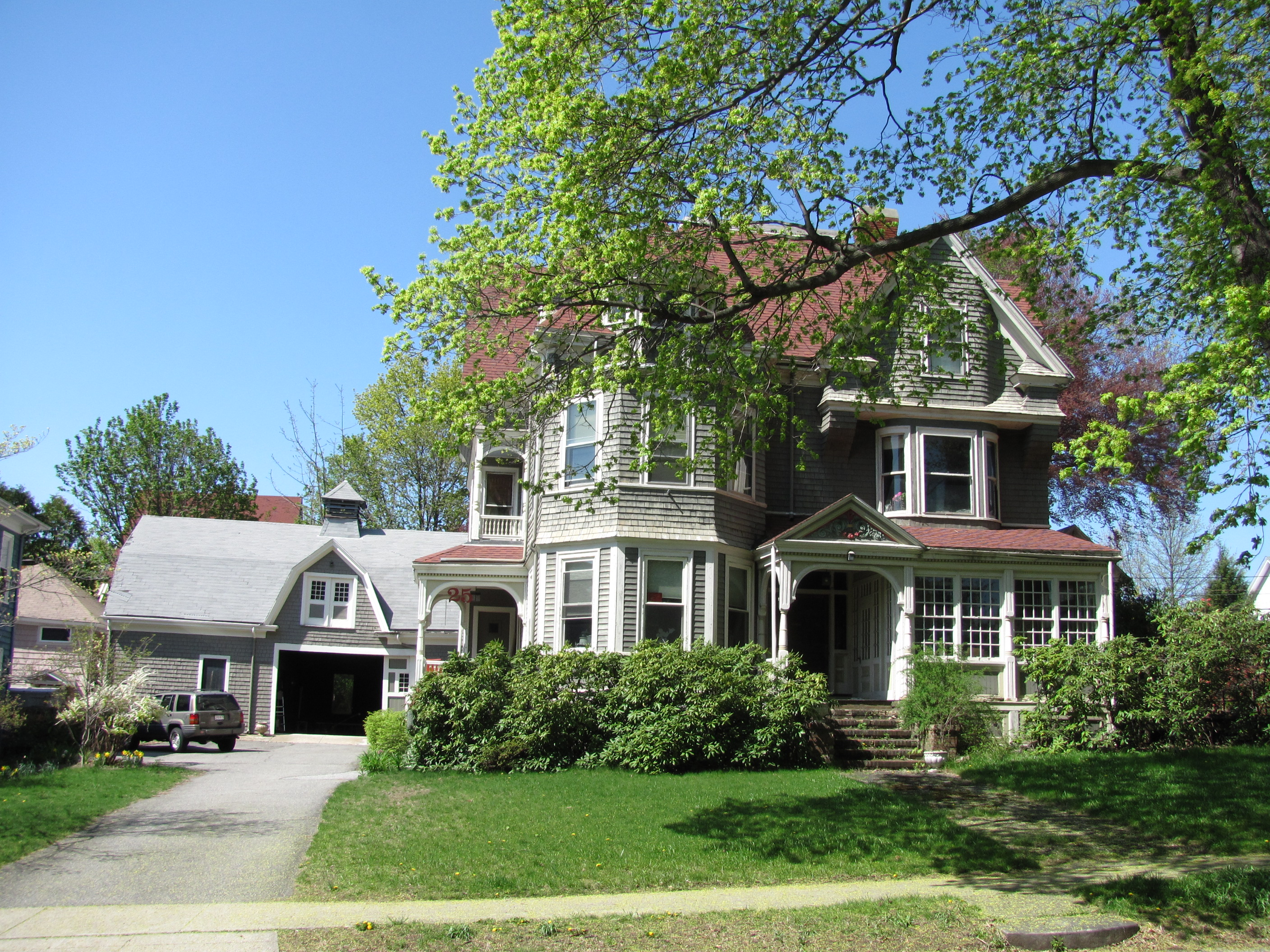
- House at 25 Avon Street

- Location within Massachusetts Location within the United States
- Location: 25 Avon St., Wakefield, Massachusetts
- Coordinates: 42°30′15″N 71°4′29″W
- Built: 1889
- Architectural style: Queen Anne, Shingle Style
- MPS: Wakefield MRA
- NRHP reference No.: 89000731
- Added to NRHP: July 06, 1989

25 Avon Street is a historic house, and is significant as one of the more elaborate Queen Anne Victorian houses in the town of Wakefield, Massachusetts.

== Description and history ==
The 2 1/2-story wood-frame house was built c. 1889, and has a combination of Queen Anne and Shingle Style features. Shingled elements include window bays, both projecting and recessed, while the porches are decorated with a clear Queen Anne flair, including arched openings and a floral design in the gable end of the front porch.

The house was listed on the National Register of Historic Places on July 6, 1989.

25 Avon Street directly neighbors 23 Avon Street, which is also on the National Register of Historic Places.

== See also ==
- National Register of Historic Places listings in Wakefield, Massachusetts
- National Register of Historic Places listings in Middlesex County, Massachusetts
