= Buildings at 35–37 Richardson Avenue =

- U.S. National Register of Historic Places
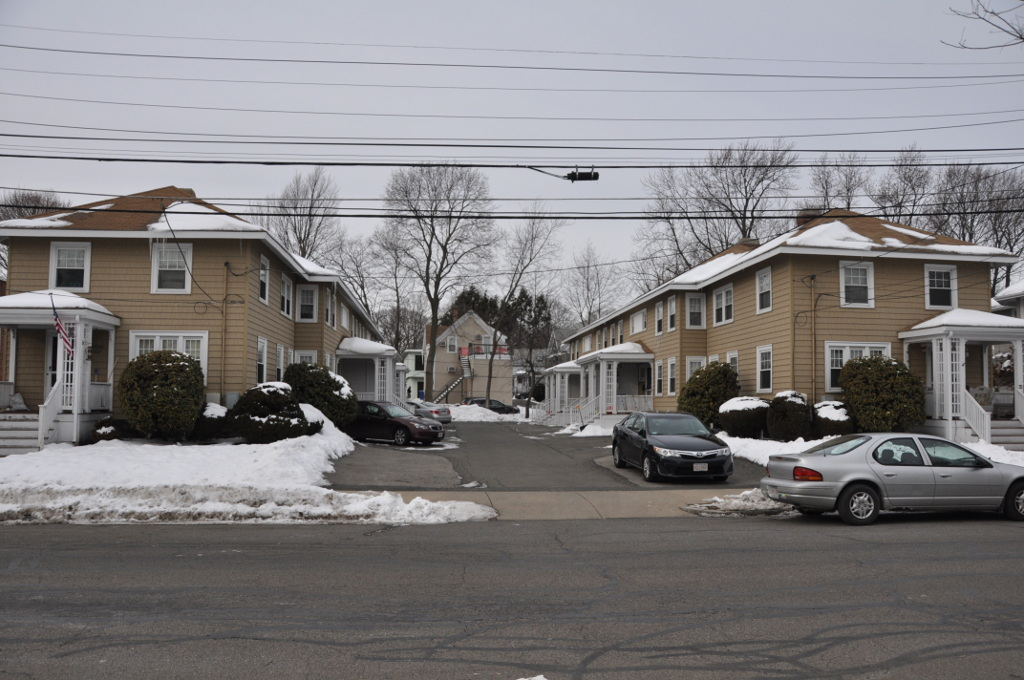
- The rowhouses seen in winter 2016

- Location within Massachusetts Location within the United States
- Location: Wakefield, Massachusetts
- Coordinates: 42°30′8″N 71°4′24″W
- Built: 1912
- MPS: Wakefield MRA
- NRHP reference No.: 89000710
- Added to NRHP: July 6, 1989

The buildings at 35–37 Richardson Avenue are historic rowhouses in Wakefield, Massachusetts. These two rowhouses, built c. 1912–15, are among the earliest apartment blocks built in the town. They were built by Solon O. Richardson, Jr. on a portion of his estate. The buildings were listed on the National Register of Historic Places in 1989.

== Description and history ==
The two rowhouses are set on the north side of Richardson Avenue, about halfway between North Avenue and Main Street, both major north–south thoroughfares through the center of Wakefield. They are two-story wood-frame structures, oriented with their long axes north–south on either side of a shared drive and parking area. They have hip roofs and clapboard siding, and rest on raised fieldstone foundations. The eaves have exposed rafter ends typical of Craftsman styling. The principal decorative elements are the main entrance porches, which have latticework support columns supporting hip roofs. Each building has three such porches, one in front and two on the side, with those on the side providing access to two units.

The area of Richardson Avenue was part of the estate of Dr. Nathan Richardson, who developed and sold a product called Sherry Wine Bitters. This business was continued by his son and grandson (both named Solon), the last of whom sold the business in 1891. Observing a shortage of housing in Wakefield center, the grandson moved the mansion house away from Main Street, and laid out Richardson Street for development. These buildings were probably built about 1912, around the same time that Richardson had the rowhouses at 38–48 Richardson built.

== See also ==
- National Register of Historic Places listings in Wakefield, Massachusetts
- National Register of Historic Places listings in Middlesex County, Massachusetts
