= Building at 38–48 Richardson Avenue =

- U.S. National Register of Historic Places
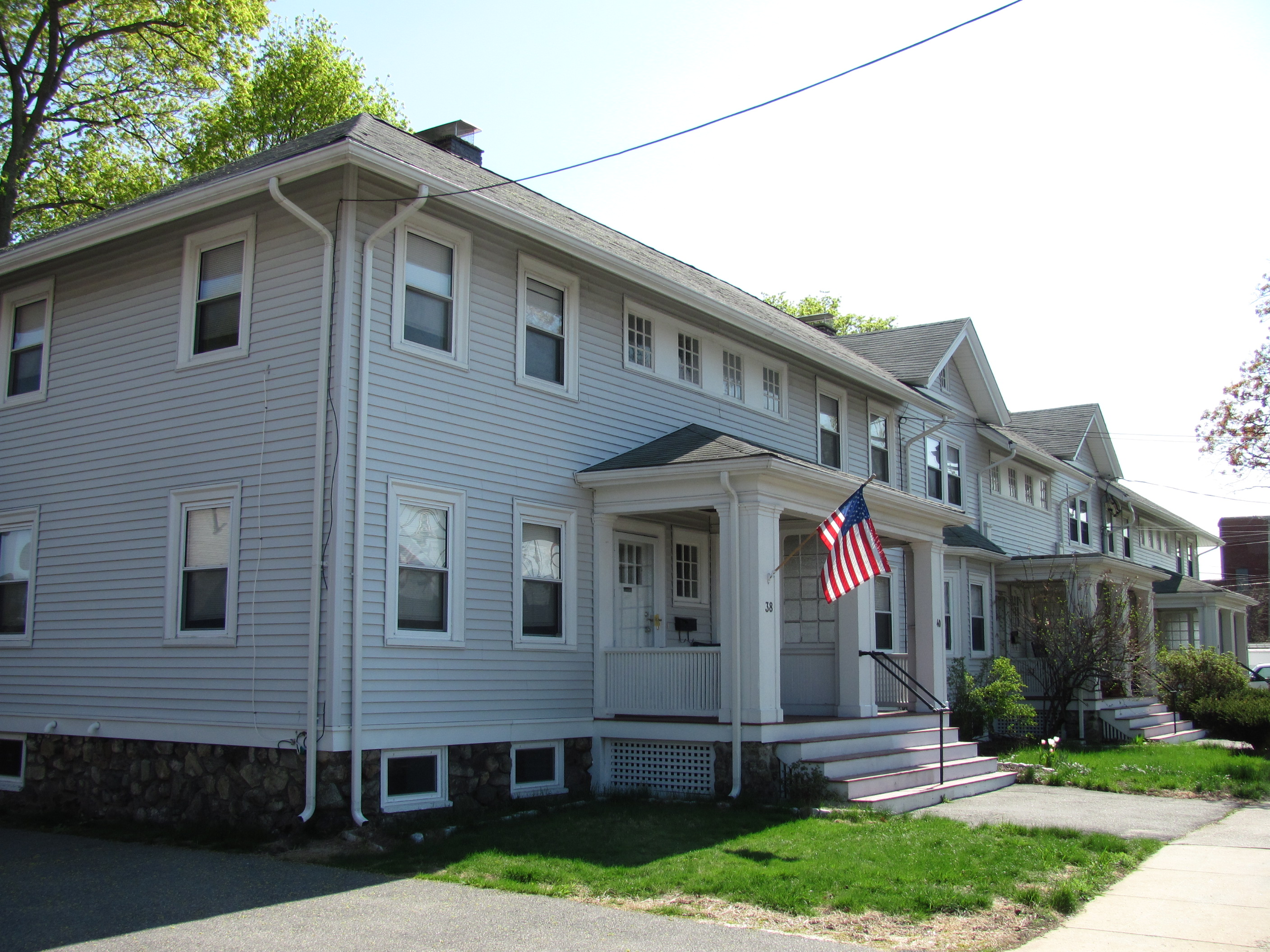

- Location within Massachusetts Location within the United States
- Location: 38–48 Richardson Ave., Wakefield, Massachusetts
- Coordinates: 42°30′5″N 71°4′30″W
- Built: 1912
- MPS: Wakefield MRA
- NRHP reference No.: 89000709
- Added to NRHP: July 6, 1989

The building at 38–48 Richardson Avenue is a historic residential rowhouse in Wakefield, Massachusetts. Built c. 1912, is believed to be one of the oldest rowhouses in the town. They were built by Solon O. Richardson, Jr., on a portion of his family's estate. The building was listed on the National Register of Historic Places in 1989.

== Description and history ==
The rowhouse is set on the south side of Richardson Avenue, at its western corner with North Street. The building is a 2 1/2-story wood-frame structure, with six units in a mix of architectural styles. Its porches are typical Colonial Revival porches, the gable ends are decorated with Tudor Revival strapping, and the deep eaves have exposed purlins, a Rational Revival feature. The units are organized in three mirror-image pairs, with the inner pair styled differently than the outer pairs. The outer pairs have a hip-roofed porch over the two entrances, with a band of nine-pane square windows above. The central pair have a flat-roof porch over the entrances, with flanking single-story oriel windows, which have gabled wall-dormers above.

The area of Richardson Avenue was part of the estate of Dr. Nathan Richardson, who developed and sold a product called Sherry Wine Bitters. This business was continued by his son and grandson (both named Solon), the last of whom sold the business in 1891. Observing a shortage of housing in Wakefield center, the grandson moved the mansion house away from Main Street, and laid out Richardson Street for development. This rowhouse was built about 1912, around the same time that Richardson had the rowhouses at 35–37 Richardson built.

== See also ==
- National Register of Historic Places listings in Wakefield, Massachusetts
- National Register of Historic Places listings in Middlesex County, Massachusetts
