= Nathaniel Cowdry House =

Historic house in Massachusetts, United States

- U.S. National Register of Historic Places
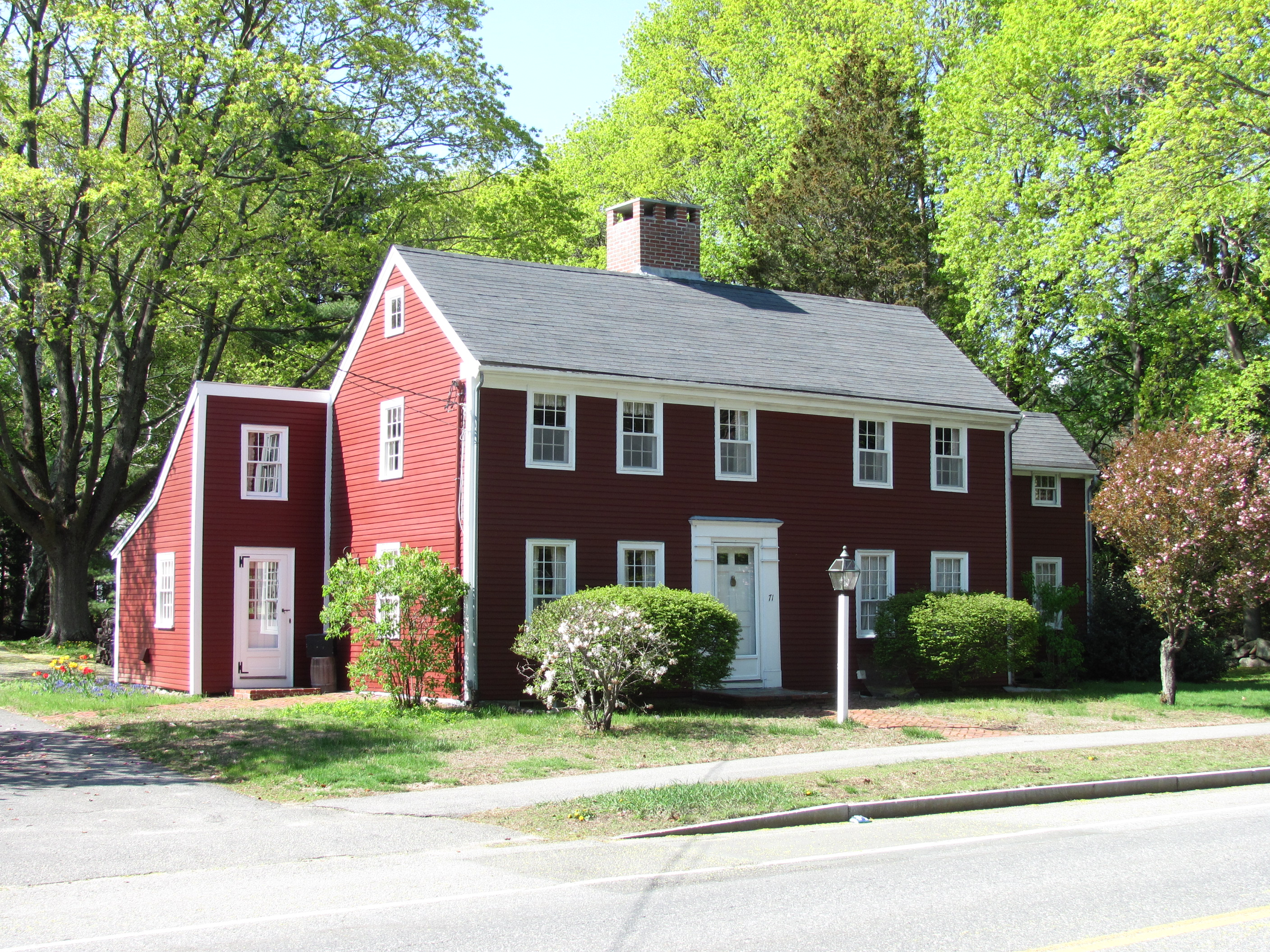
- Nathaniel Cowdry House

- Location within Massachusetts Location within the United States
- Location: 71 Prospect St., Wakefield, Massachusetts
- Coordinates: 42°30′17″N 71°5′10″W
- Area: less than one acre
- Built: 1764
- Architectural style: Georgian
- MPS: Wakefield MRA
- NRHP reference No.: 89000738
- Added to NRHP: July 06, 1989

The Nathaniel Cowdry House is a historic house at 71 Prospect Street in Wakefield, Massachusetts. Built about 1764, it is one of Wakefield's oldest buildings, built by a member of the locally prominent Cowdry family, who were early settlers. The house was listed on the National Register of Historic Places in 1989.

== Description and history ==
The Nathaniel Cowdry House stands on the north side of Prospect Street, a busy through road in a residential part of northwestern Wakefield. It is a 2 1/2-story wood-frame structure, with a rubblestone foundation, side-gable roof, central chimney, and clapboarded exterior. It is five bays wide, with a small shed-roof projection on the left side known regionally as a "Beverly jog". A slightly larger gabled ell projects to the right side. The main entrance has a simple Georgian surround with wide pilasters and a corniced entablature. Interior features of the house include original batten doors with leather strap hinges, and a plaster ceiling.

The house was built about 1764, probably on the site of the house of Nathaniel Cowdry's ancestor William, one of the area's early settlers. The house was originally three bays wide and four deep, a local variant to typical Georgian design, and was later extended to be five bays wide. The house remained in the Cowdry family until 1866, and owned farmland in the area until about 1900; next door to this house stands the Jonas Cowdry House, built by Nathaniel's son in about 1833.

== See also ==
- National Register of Historic Places listings in Wakefield, Massachusetts
- National Register of Historic Places listings in Middlesex County, Massachusetts
