= Jonas Cowdry House =

Historic house in Massachusetts, United States

- U.S. National Register of Historic Places
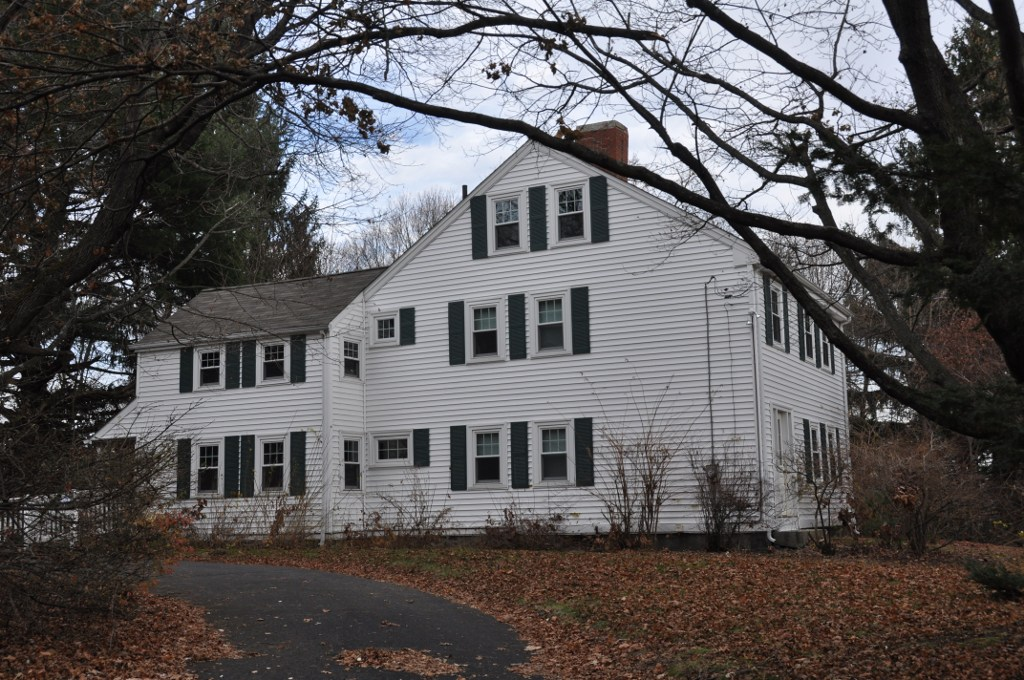

- Location within Massachusetts Location within the United States
- Location: 61 Prospect St., Wakefield, Massachusetts
- Coordinates: 42°30′18″N 71°5′8″W
- Built: 1833
- Architectural style: Federal
- MPS: Wakefield MRA
- NRHP reference No.: 89000739
- Added to NRHP: July 06, 1989

The Jonas Cowdry House is a historic house at 61 Prospect Street in Wakefield, Massachusetts. Built c. 1833, the Federal style wood-frame house is three bays wide and four deep, a significant local variant to conventional Federal style architecture. The house was listed on the National Register of Historic Places in 1989.

== Description and history ==
The Jonas Cowdry House is located on the north side of Prospect Street, just west of Nichols Street, in what is now a residential area of northwestern Wakefield. The house is a 2 1/2-story wood-frame structure, three bays wide and four deep, with a side-gable roof. The brick chimney rises at the ridge line in the center, with the main entrance located in the leftmost bay. The entrance is flanked by sidelight windows, and topped by a Federal style entablature.

The Cowdry family was one of the first to settle the area in the 17th century, which was originally part of Reading. The hill north of what is now Prospect Street became known as "Cowdry's Hill". Two of William Cowdry's descendants built houses on Prospect Street about 1833. This one was built by Jonas, while another similar was built 98 Prospect by Aaron. The area remained in Cowdry family hands until about 1900. This house is one of the finest surviving examples of 3/4 architecture in the town.

A house built by Cowdry's father, Nathaniel, in Wakefield c. 1764 is also on the National Register of Historic Places.

== See also ==
- Nathaniel Cowdry House, 71 Prospect Street
- National Register of Historic Places listings in Wakefield, Massachusetts
- National Register of Historic Places listings in Middlesex County, Massachusetts
