= House at 1 Morrison Avenue =

Historic house in Massachusetts, United States

- U.S. National Register of Historic Places
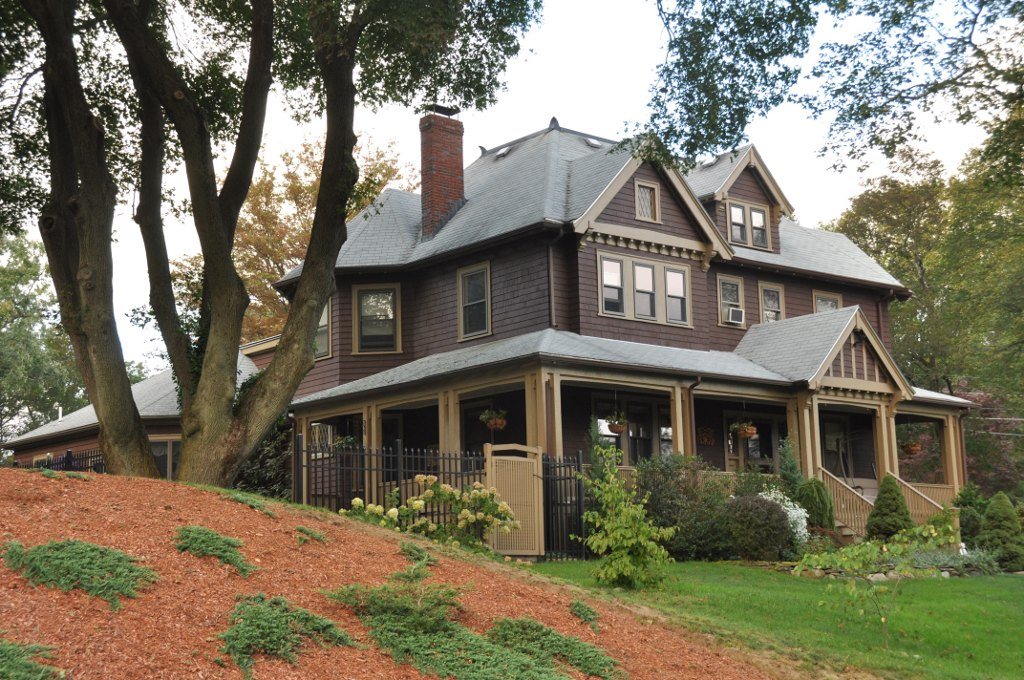

- Location within Massachusetts Location within the United States
- Location: 1 Morrison Ave., Wakefield, Massachusetts
- Coordinates: 42°30′3″N 71°5′18″W
- Built: 1890
- Architectural style: Tudor Revival
- MPS: Wakefield MRA
- NRHP reference No.: 89000722
- Added to NRHP: July 06, 1989

The House at 1 Morrison Avenue is one of a few Tudor Revival houses in Wakefield, Massachusetts. The 2 1/2-story wood-frame house has a hip roof with a copper crest, central dormer, and a larger projecting gable section on the left. The single story porch wraps around two sides of the house, and features a high gable over the front stairs which is decorated with bargeboard and half timbers. It was built c. 1890 on land that had been acquired and subdivided by J. S. Merrill and Charles Hanks as part of the major Wakefield Park subdivision.

The house was listed on the National Register of Historic Places in 1989.

== See also ==
- National Register of Historic Places listings in Wakefield, Massachusetts
- National Register of Historic Places listings in Middlesex County, Massachusetts
