= Cowderoy =

Cowderoy is a surname. Notable people with the surname include:

- Cyril Cowderoy (1905–1976), English Roman Catholic archbishop
- Jacqui Cowderoy (born 1961), Australian alpine skier
- John Cowderoy (1851–1934), English cricketer

== See also ==
- Cowdery
