= Cowdrey =

Cowdrey may refer to:

== People ==
=== Sportspeople ===
- Anne Cowdrey, 14th Lady Herries of Terregles (1938–2014), British racehorse owner
- Charlie Cowdrey (1933–2011), American football coach
- Chris Cowdrey (born 1957), English cricketer, the son of Colin Cowdrey
- Colin Cowdrey (1932–2000), English cricketer
- Fabian Cowdrey (born 1993), English cricketer, the son of Chris Cowdrey
- Graham Cowdrey (born 1964), English cricketer, the son of Colin Cowdrey
- Matt Cowdrey (born 1988), Australian swimmer

=== Other people ===
- Albert E. Cowdrey (born 1933), American author
- H. E. J. Cowdrey (1926–2009), English historian of the Middle Ages

== Other ==
- Cowdrey Cricket Club, an amateur cricket club in Tonbridge, Kent, England, named after Colin Cowdrey
- Cowdrey, Colorado, United States
- Cowdrey House, an historic house in Yellville, Arkansas, United States
- George Cowdrey House, an historic house in Stoneham, Massachusetts, United States
- Lake Cowdrey, a lake in Minnesota, United States
