= Boston and Maine Railroad Depot =

Boston and Maine Railroad Depot may refer to:

- Contoocook Railroad Depot, Contoocook, NH, listed on the NRHP in New Hampshire
- Ely Railroad Depot, Fairlee, VT, listed on the NRHP in Vermont
- Raymond Railroad Depot, Raymond, NH, listed on the NRHP in New Hampshire
- Reading Railroad Depot, Reading, Massachusetts, listed on the NRHP in Massachusetts
- Stoneham Railroad Depot, Stoneham, Massachusetts, listed on the NRHP in Massachusetts
