= Enoch Fuller House =

Historic house in Massachusetts, United States

- U.S. National Register of Historic Places
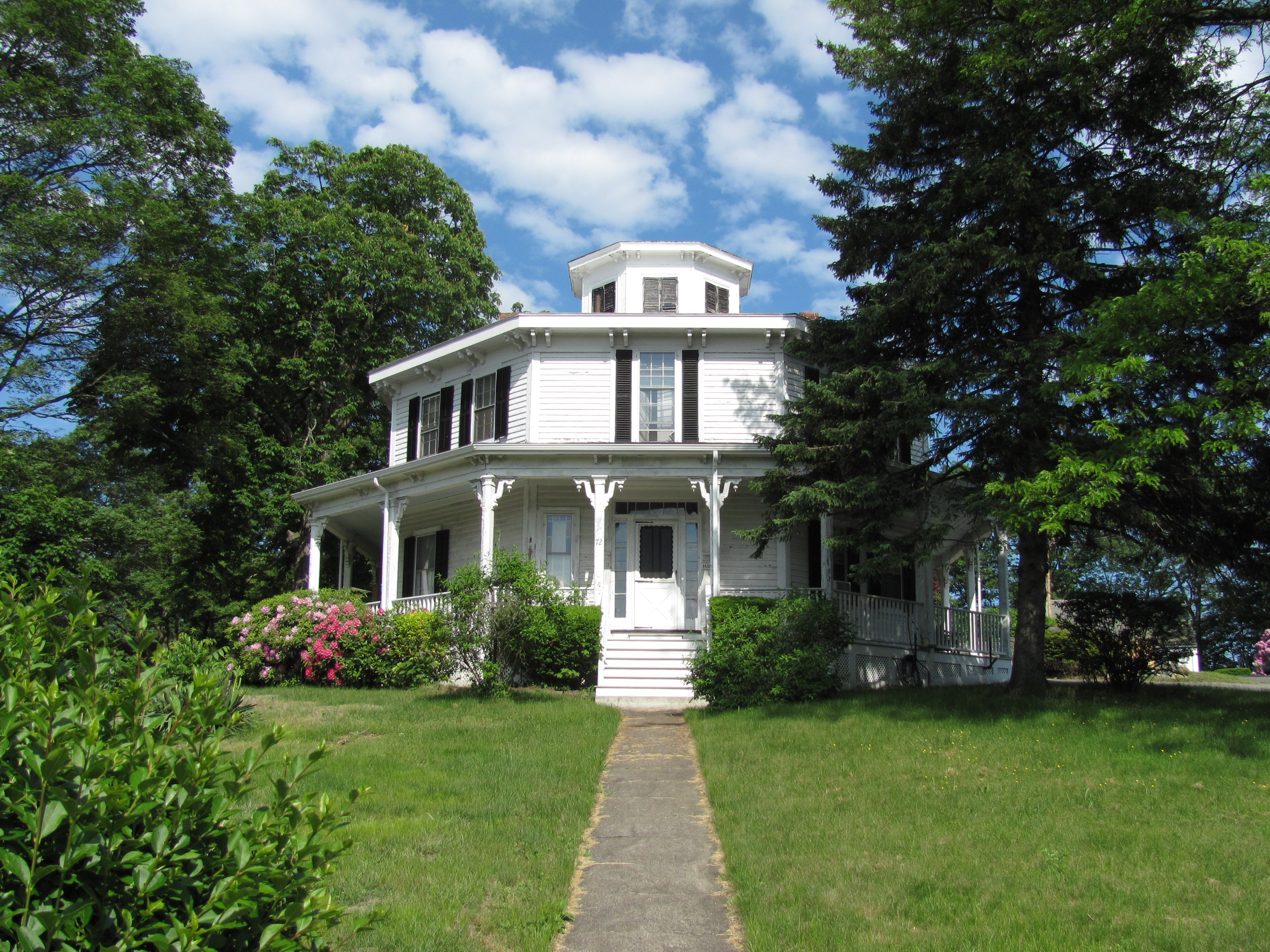
- Enoch Fuller House

- Location within Massachusetts Location within the United States
- Location: 72 Pine St., Stoneham, Massachusetts
- Coordinates: 42°28′32″N 71°5′55″W
- Built: 1850
- Architectural style: Octagon Mode
- MPS: Stoneham MRA
- NRHP reference No.: 84002619
- Added to NRHP: April 13, 1984

The Enoch Fuller House is a historic octagon house located at 72 Pine Street in Stoneham, Massachusetts. The two-story wood-frame house was built c. 1850 for Enoch Fuller, a friend of P. T. Barnum and is topped by a low pitch roof with a central cupola. There is a single-story porch that wraps around the entire building. The porch is supported by chamfered posts decorated with drop pendant brackets and has a cut baluster rail. The roof lines of the porch, main roof, and cupola, are all studded with paired brackets.

On April 13, 1984, it was added to the National Register of Historic Places.

== See also ==
- List of octagon houses
- William Bryant Octagon House, also in Stoneham
- National Register of Historic Places listings in Stoneham, Massachusetts
- National Register of Historic Places listings in Middlesex County, Massachusetts
