= Locke–Baldwin–Kinsley House =

Historic house in Massachusetts, United States

- U.S. National Register of Historic Places
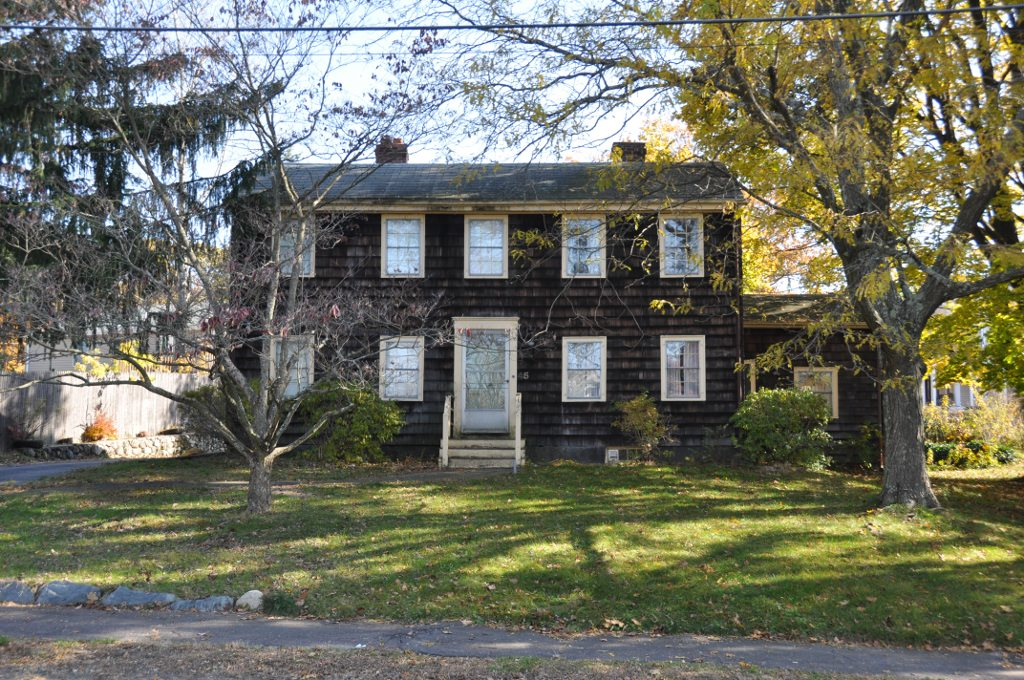

- Location within Massachusetts Location within the United States
- Location: 45 Green St., Stoneham, Massachusetts
- Coordinates: 42°29′0″N 71°5′24″W
- Built: 1744
- Architectural style: Colonial
- MPS: Stoneham MRA
- NRHP reference No.: 84002742
- Added to NRHP: April 13, 1984

The Locke–Baldwin–Kinsley House is a historic house at 45 Green Street in Stoneham, Massachusetts, United States. The two-story timber-frame house was built c. 1744 on land belonging to the Locke family. It has two slender interior chimneys, and an ell on the south side that has documented use as a shoe shop its early 19th-century owners. The house was later (1867) owned by Micah Baldwin, a harness maker, and has remained in the hands of his descendants.

The house was listed on the National Register of Historic Places in 1984.

== See also ==
- National Register of Historic Places listings in Stoneham, Massachusetts
- National Register of Historic Places listings in Middlesex County, Massachusetts
