= Shoe Shop–Doucette Ten Footer =

- U.S. National Register of Historic Places
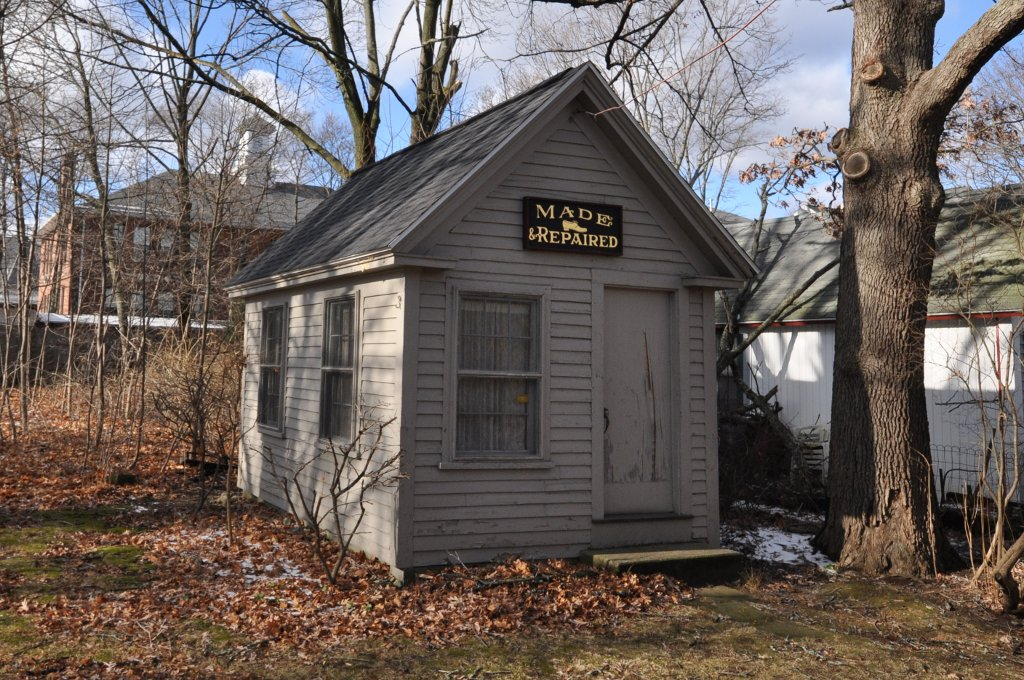

- Location within Massachusetts Location within the United States
- Location: 36 William St., Stoneham, Massachusetts
- Coordinates: 42°28′57″N 71°5′56″W
- Built: 1850
- NRHP reference No.: 84002821
- Added to NRHP: April, 1984

The Shoe Shop–Doucette Ten Footer is a historic wooden building at 36 William Street in Stoneham, Massachusetts, in the United States. In April 1984, it was listed in the National Register of Historic Places. The building sits at the back of the Stoneham Historical Society premises.

A ten footer was a small backyard shop structure built in the 18th and 19th centuries in New England to serve as a shoemaker's shop. The name came from the fact that it was usually 10 feet (3.0 m) by 10 feet (3.0 m) in area. The ten footers were forerunners of the large shoe factories that developed in New England later in the 19th century.

== See also ==
- National Register of Historic Places listings in Stoneham, Massachusetts
- National Register of Historic Places listings in Middlesex County, Massachusetts

== Sources ==
- Hunter, Ethel A., The Ten-Footers of New England in Parks, Roger, editor, The New England Galaxy: The best of 20 years from Old Sturbridge Village, Chester Connecticut: Globe Pequot Press, 1980, pp. 134–139, ISBN 0-87106-040-X
