= T.U. Lyon House =

Historic house in Massachusetts, United States

- U.S. National Register of Historic Places
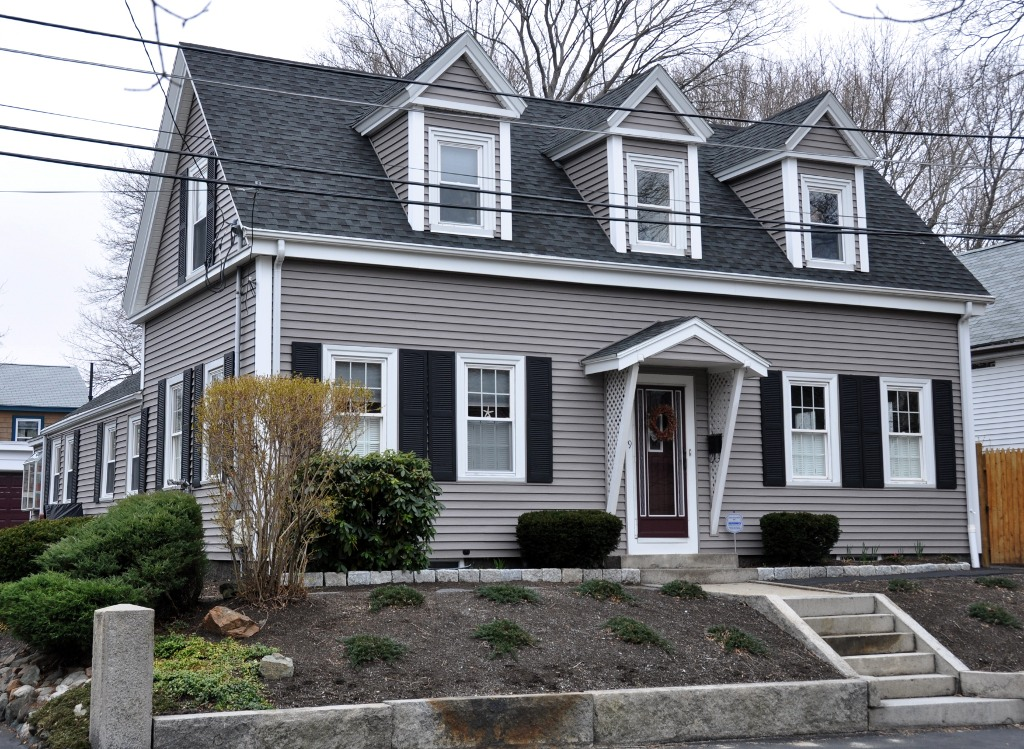

- Location within Massachusetts Location within the United States
- Location: 9 Warren St., Stoneham, Massachusetts
- Coordinates: 42°28′39″N 71°6′7″W
- Built: 1850
- Architectural style: Greek Revival
- MPS: Stoneham MRA
- NRHP reference No.: 84002743
- Added to NRHP: April 13, 1984

The T.U. Lyon House is a historic house at 9 Warren Street in Stoneham, Massachusetts. The modest 1 1/2-story Greek Revival house was built c. 1850 for T.U. Lyon, a shoe cutter. At the time of its construction Warren Street had been supplanted as the major north–south road through Stoneham by the Medford-Andover Turnpike (now Main Street, Massachusetts Route 28). Most of its distinctive Greek Revival features, including corner pilasters and a larger-than-typical frieze, have been lost due to recent residing of the exterior (see photo).

The house was listed on the National Register of Historic Places in 1984.

== See also ==
- National Register of Historic Places listings in Stoneham, Massachusetts
- National Register of Historic Places listings in Middlesex County, Massachusetts
