= C.H. Brown Cottage =

Historic house in Massachusetts, United States

- U.S. National Register of Historic Places
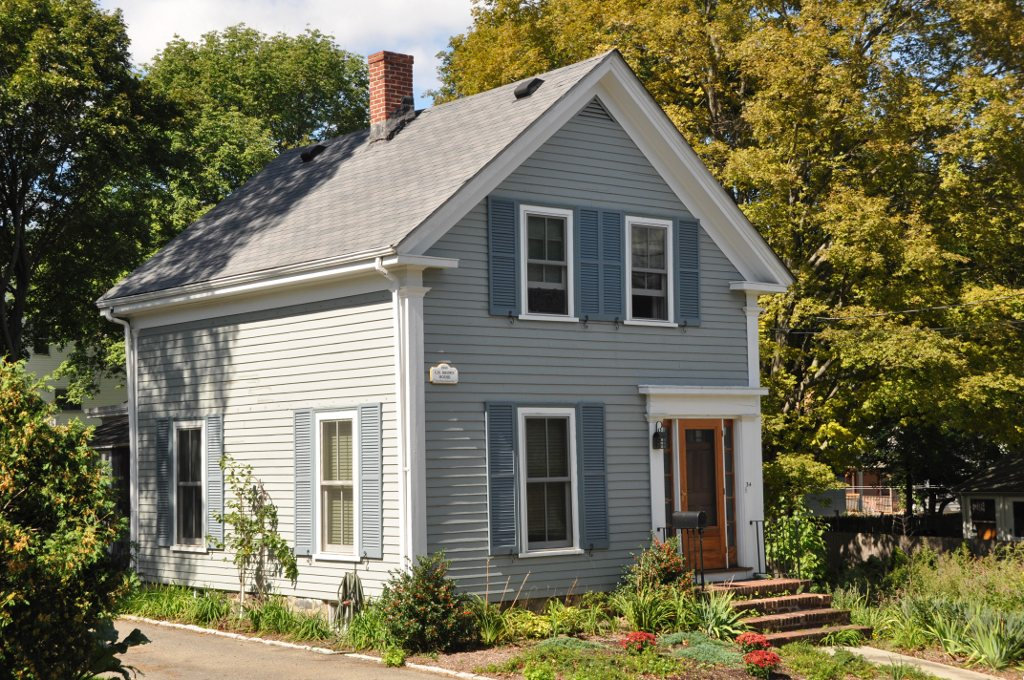

- Location within Massachusetts Location within the United States
- Location: 34 Wright St., Stoneham, Massachusetts
- Coordinates: 42°28′43″N 71°6′10″W
- Built: 1835
- Architectural style: Greek Revival
- MPS: Stoneham MRA
- NRHP reference No.: 84002525
- Added to NRHP: April 13, 1984

The C.H. Brown Cottage is a historic house at 34 Wright Street in Stoneham, Massachusetts. Probably built in the 1830s, it is a well-preserved example of worker housing built for employees of local shoe factories. It was listed on the National Register of Historic Places in 1984.

== Description and history ==
The C.H. Brown Cottage stands in a residential area one block west of Stoneham's Central Square, on the west side of Wright Street midway between Maple and Lincoln Streets. It is a small 1 1/2-story wood-frame structure, with a gabled roof and clapboarded exterior. Its front facade is two bays wide, with pilastered corners and a narrow entablature on the sides. The main entrance is in the right bay, flanked by full-length sidelight windows and pilasters, which support an entablature and cornice. A single-story ell of modern construction extends to the rear.

The cottage was probably built in sometime in the 1830s, based on stylistic analysis; its original owner is unknown. A later owner, C.H. Brown, was one of the proprietors of a local tannery; he lived in a mansion at Chestnut and Maple Streets. It is one of a modest number of worker housing units to survive from Stoneham's early industrial period as shoemaking center.

== See also ==
- National Register of Historic Places listings in Stoneham, Massachusetts
- National Register of Historic Places listings in Middlesex County, Massachusetts
