= Cowdery =

Cowdery is a surname. Notable people with the surname include:

- Clive Cowdery (born 1963), English businessman
- John Cowdery (1930–2013), American politician
- Josh Cowdery (born 1978), American actor
- Mae Virginia Cowdery (1909–1953), American poet
- Nicholas Cowdery (born 1946), Australian barrister
- Oliver Cowdery (1806–1850), American Latter Day Saint
- Warren A. Cowdery (1788–1851), American Latter Day Saint

== See also ==
- Cowdrey (disambiguation)
