= E. A. Durgin House =

Historic house in Massachusetts, United States

- U.S. National Register of Historic Places
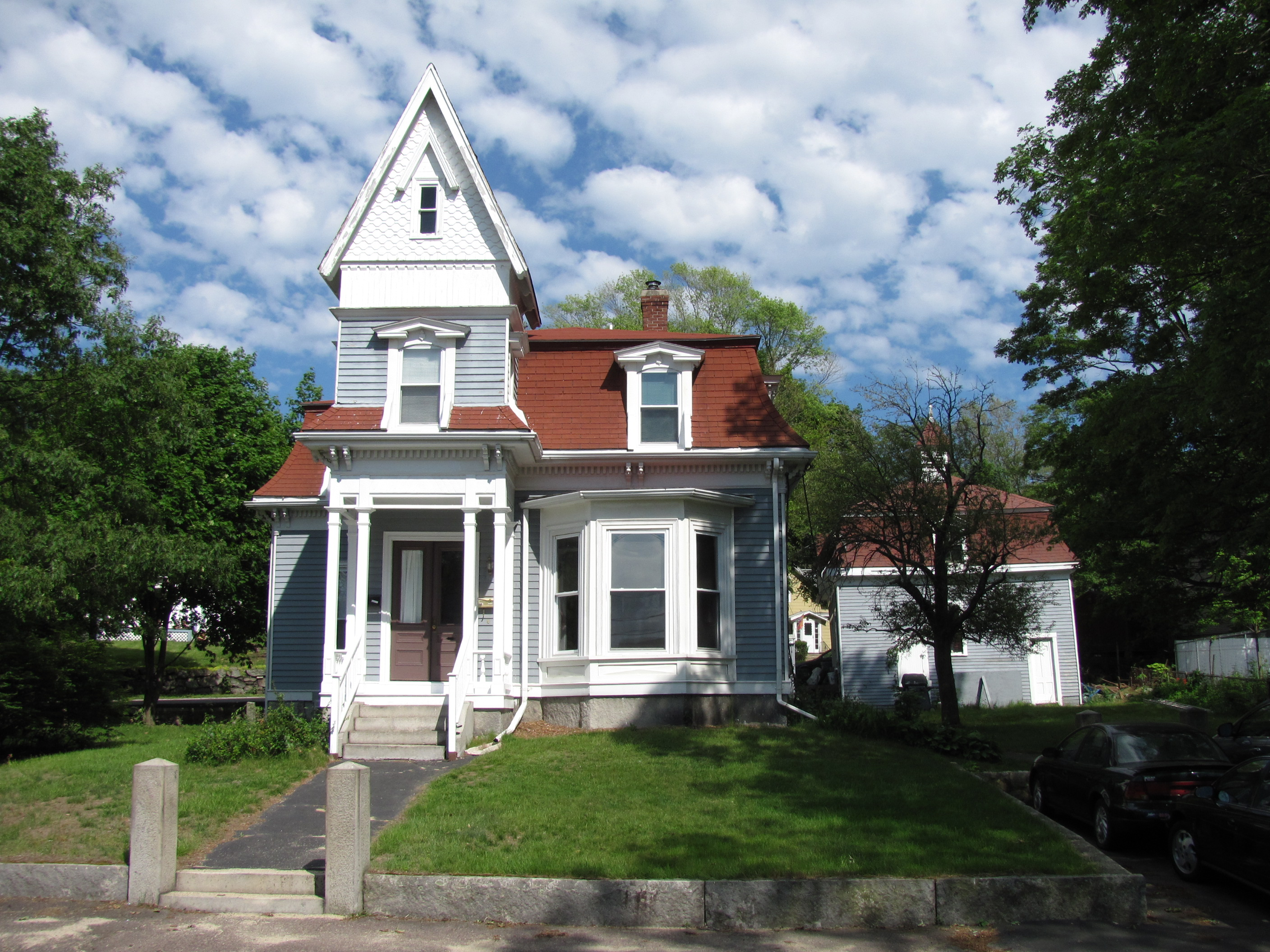
- E. A. Durgin House

- Location within Massachusetts Location within the United States
- Location: 113 Summer St., Stoneham, Massachusetts
- Coordinates: 42°28′42″N 71°5′40″W
- Built: 1870
- Architectural style: Second Empire
- MPS: Stoneham MRA
- NRHP reference No.: 84002572
- Added to NRHP: April 13, 1984

The E. A. Durgin House is a historic house at 113 Summer Street in Stoneham, Massachusetts. The two-story wood-frame Second Empire style house was built c. 1870 for E. A. Durgin, a local shoe dealer, and is one of Stoneham's most elaborately styled 19th-century houses. Its main feature is a square tower with a steeply pitched gable roof that stands over the entrance. The gable of the tower is clad in scalloped wood shingles, and includes a small window that is topped by its own gable. The house has a typical mansard roof, although the original slate has been replaced with asphalt shingling, with a cornice that is decorated with dentil molding and studded by paired brackets.

The house was listed on the National Register of Historic Places in 1984.

== See also ==
- National Register of Historic Places listings in Stoneham, Massachusetts
- National Register of Historic Places listings in Middlesex County, Massachusetts
