= House at 19 Tremont Street =

Historic house in Massachusetts, United States

- U.S. National Register of Historic Places
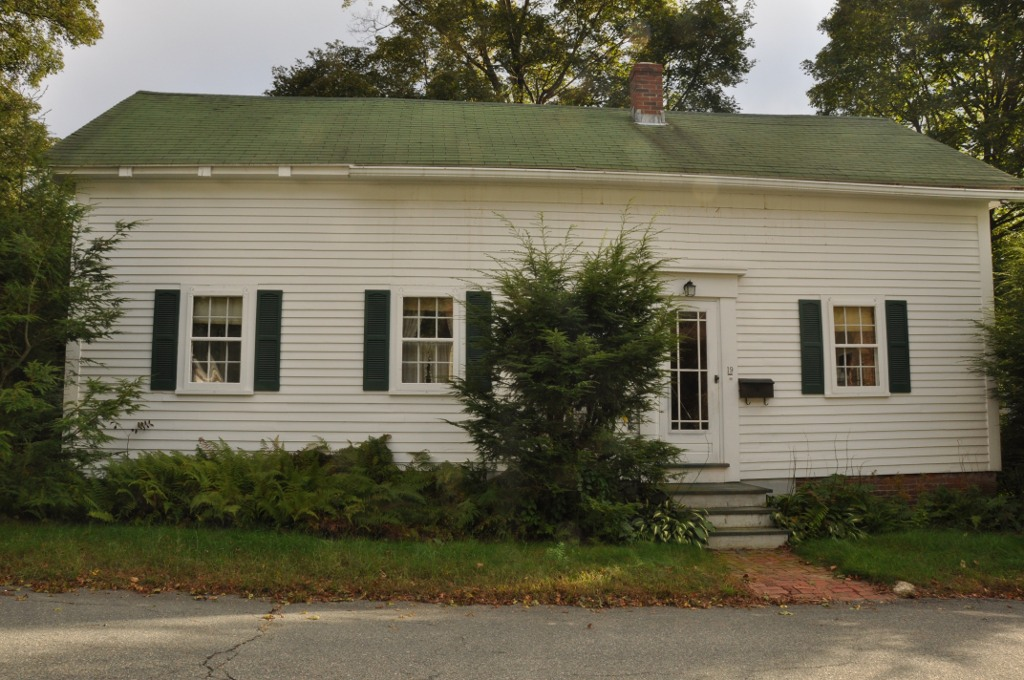

- Location within Massachusetts Location within the United States
- Location: 19 Tremont St., Stoneham, Massachusetts
- Coordinates: 42°29′9″N 71°5′49″W
- Built: 1860
- MPS: Stoneham MRA
- NRHP reference No.: 84002671
- Added to NRHP: April 13, 1984

The House at 19 Tremont Street is the smallest extant 19th century worker's cottage in Stoneham, Massachusetts. Built c. 1850, it is a stylistically vernacular single-story wood-frame structure, four bays wide, with a side gable roof, clapboard siding, and a brick foundation. Its only significant decorative features is its entry, which has sidelight windows typical of the Greek Revival period. It is the best surviving example of what was once a row of worker cottages that lined Tremont Street.

The house was listed on the National Register of Historic Places in 1984.

== See also ==
- National Register of Historic Places listings in Stoneham, Massachusetts
- National Register of Historic Places listings in Middlesex County, Massachusetts
