= Walter Keene House =

Historic house in Massachusetts, United States

- U.S. National Register of Historic Places
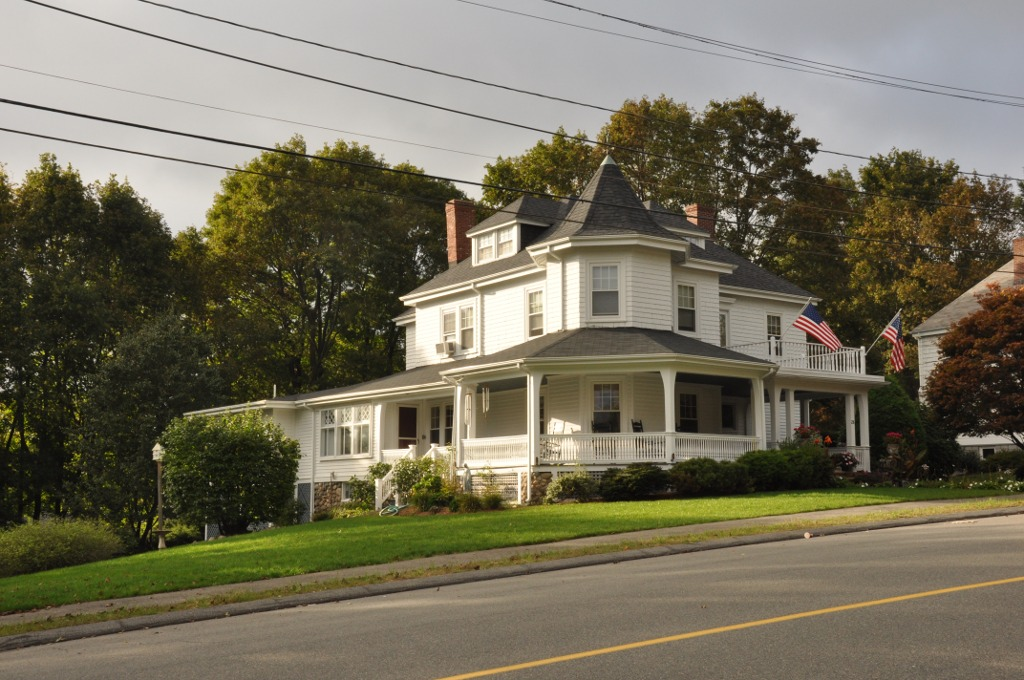

- Location within Massachusetts Location within the United States
- Location: 28 High St., Stoneham, Massachusetts
- Coordinates: 42°29′23″N 71°5′44″W
- Built: 1890
- Architectural style: Colonial Revival, Queen Anne
- MPS: Stoneham MRA
- NRHP reference No.: 84002719
- Added to NRHP: April 13, 1984

The Walter Keene House is a historic house located at 28 High Street in Stoneham, Massachusetts. The 2 1/2-story wood-frame building was constructed c. 1900 and serves as an excellent local example of a transitional Queen Anne-Colonial Revival house. Its hip roof and front porch are typically Colonial Revival, while the left-side turret and turned posts and balusters exhibit Queen Anne characteristics. The house was built for Walter Keene, a local shoe salesman and banker who played a significant role in developing much of the surrounding area. Stoneham's Keene Street is named in his honor.

The house was listed on the National Register of Historic Places in 1984.

== See also ==
- National Register of Historic Places listings in Stoneham, Massachusetts
- National Register of Historic Places listings in Middlesex County, Massachusetts
