= R.P. Turnbull House =

Historic house in Massachusetts, United States

- U.S. National Register of Historic Places
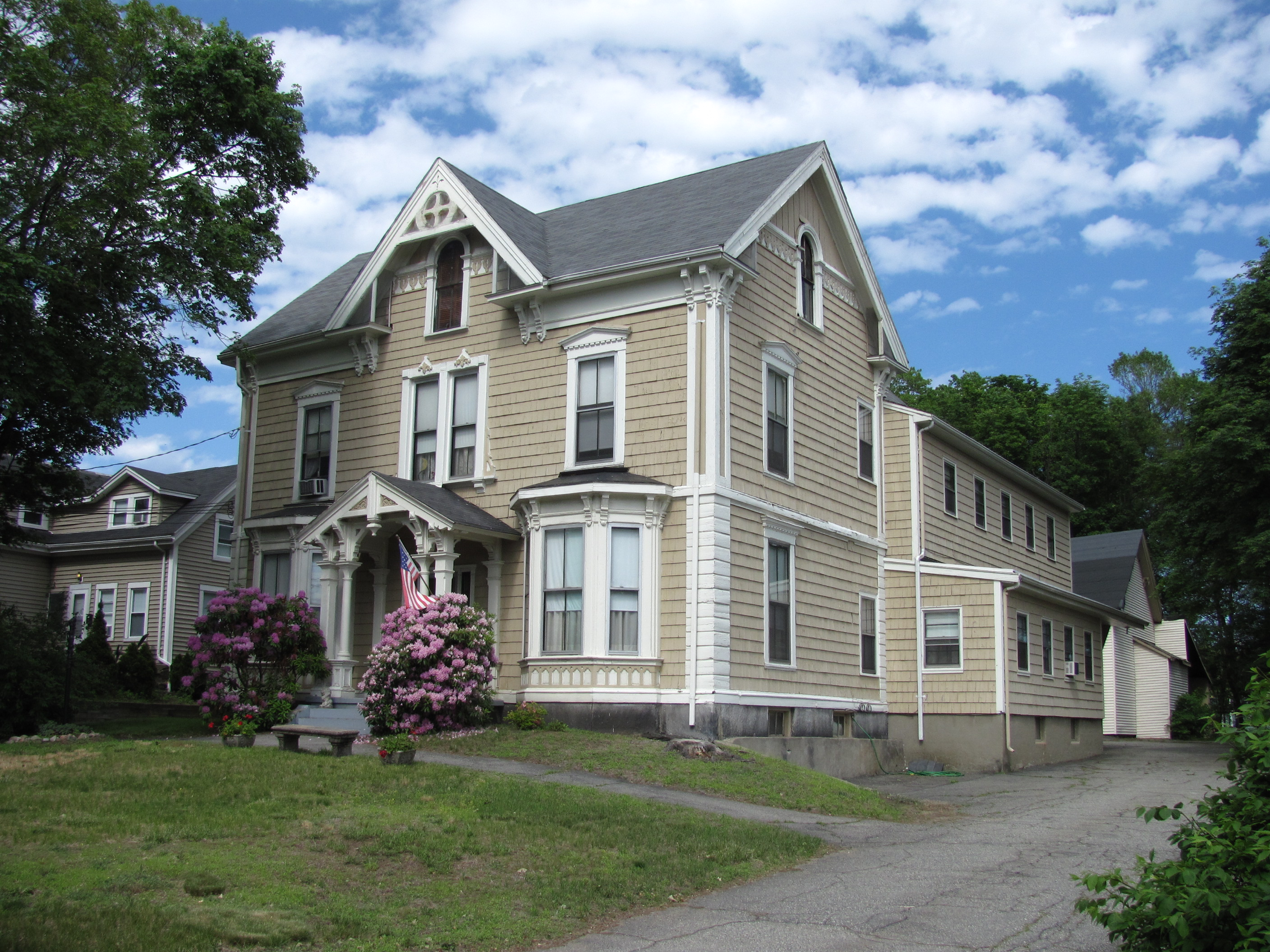
- R.P. Turnbull House

- Location within Massachusetts Location within the United States
- Location: 6 Pine St., Stoneham, Massachusetts
- Coordinates: 42°28′53″N 71°5′52″W
- Built: 1865
- Architectural style: Italianate
- MPS: Stoneham MRA
- NRHP reference No.: 84002839
- Added to NRHP: April 13, 1984

The R.P. Turnbull House is a historic house at 6 Pine Street in Stoneham, Massachusetts. The ornately decorated Italianate house was built c. 1865 for R. P. Turnbull, a partner in the Tidd Tannery. The main block of the house follows a typical Italianate three-bay plan with a large central cross gable section on the roof. The central entry is sheltered by an elaborately decorated porch, and the flanking bay windows are topped by roof sections with decorative brackets. The main cornice is studded with paired brackets, and the gable ends have decorative shingle work around round-arch windows, with some Stick style decorative woodwork at the point of the gable.

The house was listed on the National Register of Historic Places in 1984.

== See also ==
- National Register of Historic Places listings in Stoneham, Massachusetts
- National Register of Historic Places listings in Middlesex County, Massachusetts
