= House at 6 S. Marble Street =

Historic house in Massachusetts, United States

- U.S. National Register of Historic Places
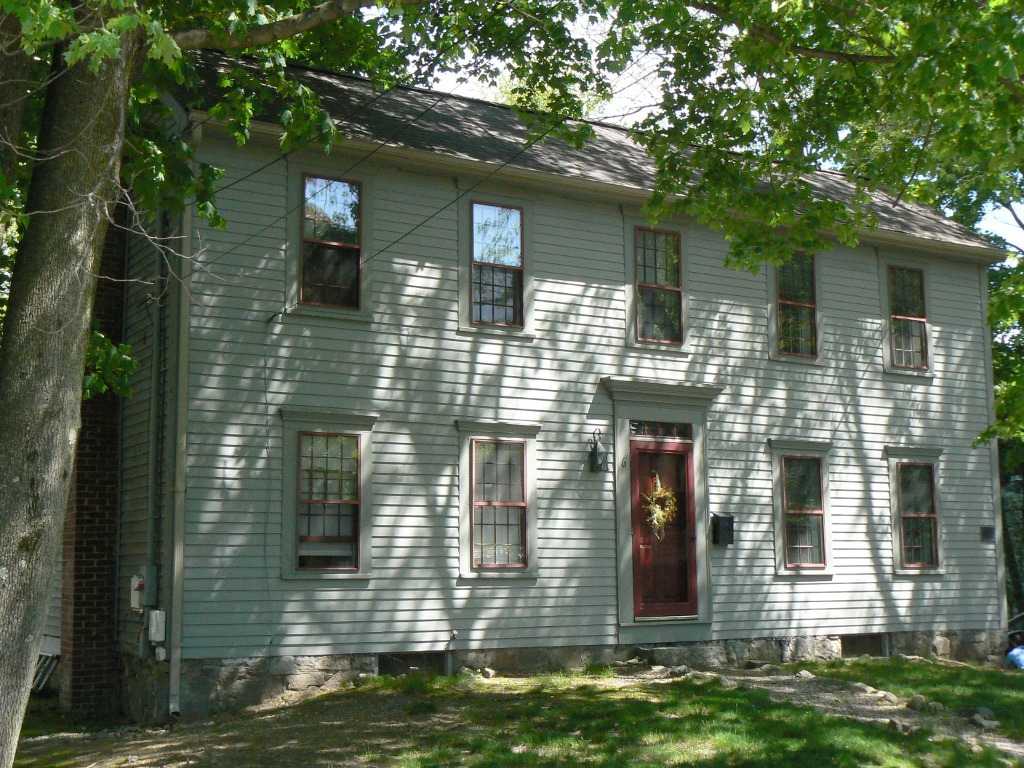

- Location within Massachusetts Location within the United States
- Location: 6 S. Marble St., Stoneham, Massachusetts
- Coordinates: 42°28′48″N 71°6′21″W
- Built: 1810
- MPS: Stoneham MRA
- NRHP reference No.: 84002690
- Added to NRHP: April 13, 1984

The House at 6 S. Marble Street in Stoneham, Massachusetts, is a rare early 19th century worker's house, and the only significant survivor of the early quarrying industry in Stoneham. It is a wood-frame house, two stories high, five bays wide and one room deep, with a side gable roof and a granite foundation. It has simple cornerboards and door and window trim. Houses like this were somewhat common on the early routes through the town, of which South Marble Street is a relatively undisturbed surviving fragment. This house was built about 1810.

The house was listed on the National Register of Historic Places in 1984.

== See also ==
- National Register of Historic Places listings in Stoneham, Massachusetts
- National Register of Historic Places listings in Middlesex County, Massachusetts
