= House at 269 Green Street =

Historic house in Massachusetts, United States

- U.S. National Register of Historic Places
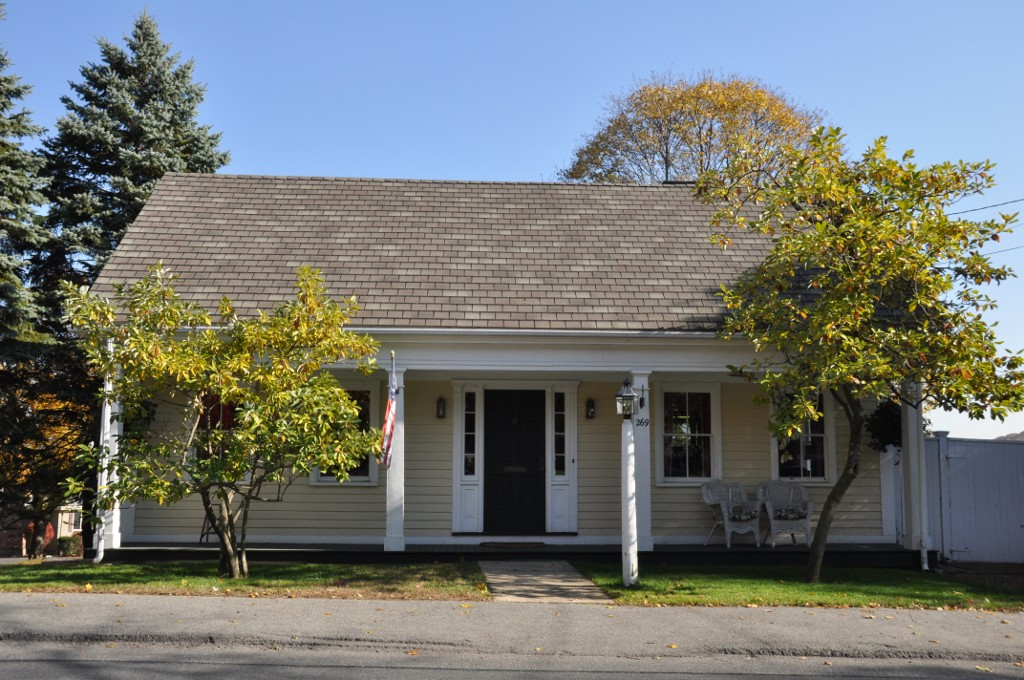

- Location within Massachusetts Location within the United States
- Location: 269 Green St., Stoneham, Massachusetts
- Coordinates: 42°28′49″N 71°5′5″W
- Area: less than one acre
- Built: 1840
- Architectural style: Greek Revival
- MPS: Stoneham MRA
- NRHP reference No.: 84002682
- Added to NRHP: April 13, 1984

The House at 269 Green Street in Stoneham, Massachusetts is a well-preserved Greek Revival cottage with unusual layout. Unlike most small Greek Revival houses, the roof slope faces front, and shelters a cutaway porch supported by square Tuscan columns. Built c. 1810, it has typical Greek Revival features, including corner pilasters and an entry framed by sidelight windows. Several houses of this type were built in Stoneham; this one is the best-preserved.

The house was listed on the National Register of Historic Places in 1984.

== See also ==
- National Register of Historic Places listings in Stoneham, Massachusetts
- National Register of Historic Places listings in Middlesex County, Massachusetts
