= House at 114 Marble Street =

Historic house in Massachusetts, United States

- U.S. National Register of Historic Places
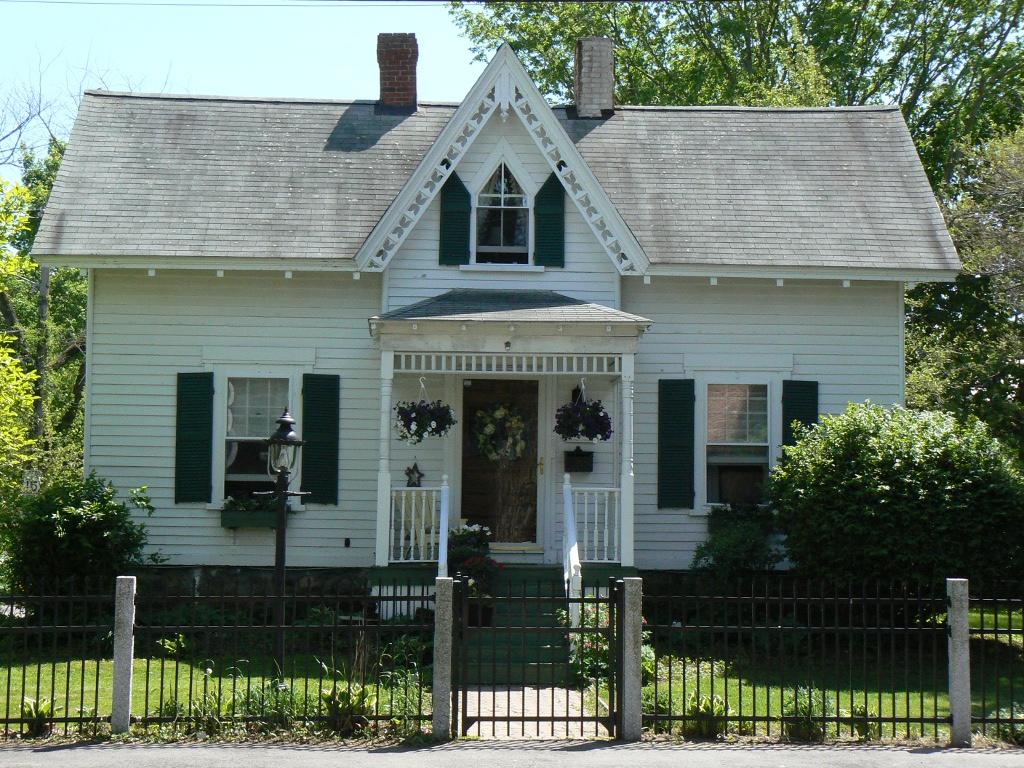

- Location within Massachusetts Location within the United States
- Location: 114 Marble St., Stoneham, Massachusetts
- Coordinates: 42°28′22″N 71°7′8″W
- Built: 1850
- Architectural style: Gothic Revival
- MPS: Stoneham MRA
- NRHP reference No.: 84002661
- Added to NRHP: April 13, 1984

The House at 114 Marble Street in Stoneham, Massachusetts is a well-preserved Gothic Victorian cottage, built c. 1850. It is a 1 1/2-story wood-frame house with a rear ell, sheathed in wooden clapboards. It has a front gable centered over the main entry, which features turned posts and balusters, and a Stick-style valance. Windows in the gable ends have pointed arches characteristic of the style. The front gable is decorated with vergeboard.

The house was listed on the National Register of Historic Places in 1984.

== See also ==
- National Register of Historic Places listings in Stoneham, Massachusetts
- National Register of Historic Places listings in Middlesex County, Massachusetts
