= Old Burying Ground (Stoneham, Massachusetts) =

Historic cemetery in Massachusetts, United States

- U.S. National Register of Historic Places
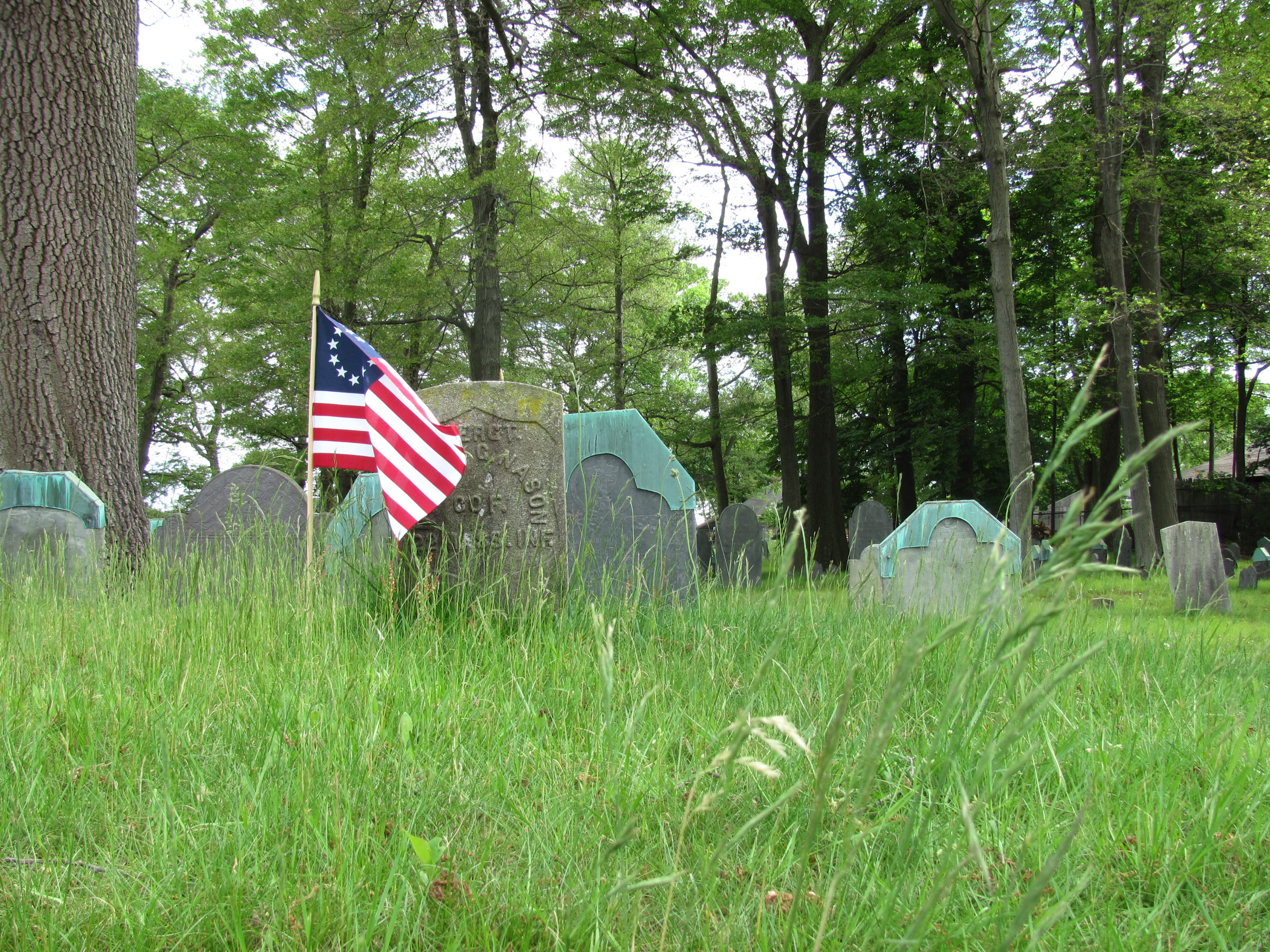
- Old Burying Ground

- Location within Massachusetts Location within the United States
- Location: Pleasant and William Sts., Stoneham, Massachusetts
- Coordinates: 42°28′53″N 71°5′48″W
- Built: 1728
- MPS: Stoneham MRA
- NRHP reference No.: 84002766
- Added to NRHP: April 13, 1984

The Old Burying Ground is a historic cemetery on Pleasant and William Streets in Stoneham, Massachusetts. Established in 1726, it is the only surviving element of Stoneham's original town center, which also included a meeting house and school. It contains about 450 stones and fragments, with grave markers dating from 1728 to 1924. The stones were carved with motifs that were fairly typical of the period including urns, willows, cherubs, and winged death heads.

The cemetery was listed on the National Register of Historic Places in 1984.

== See also ==
- National Register of Historic Places listings in Stoneham, Massachusetts
- National Register of Historic Places listings in Middlesex County, Massachusetts
