= Padilla Beard House =

Historic house in Massachusetts, United States

- U.S. National Register of Historic Places
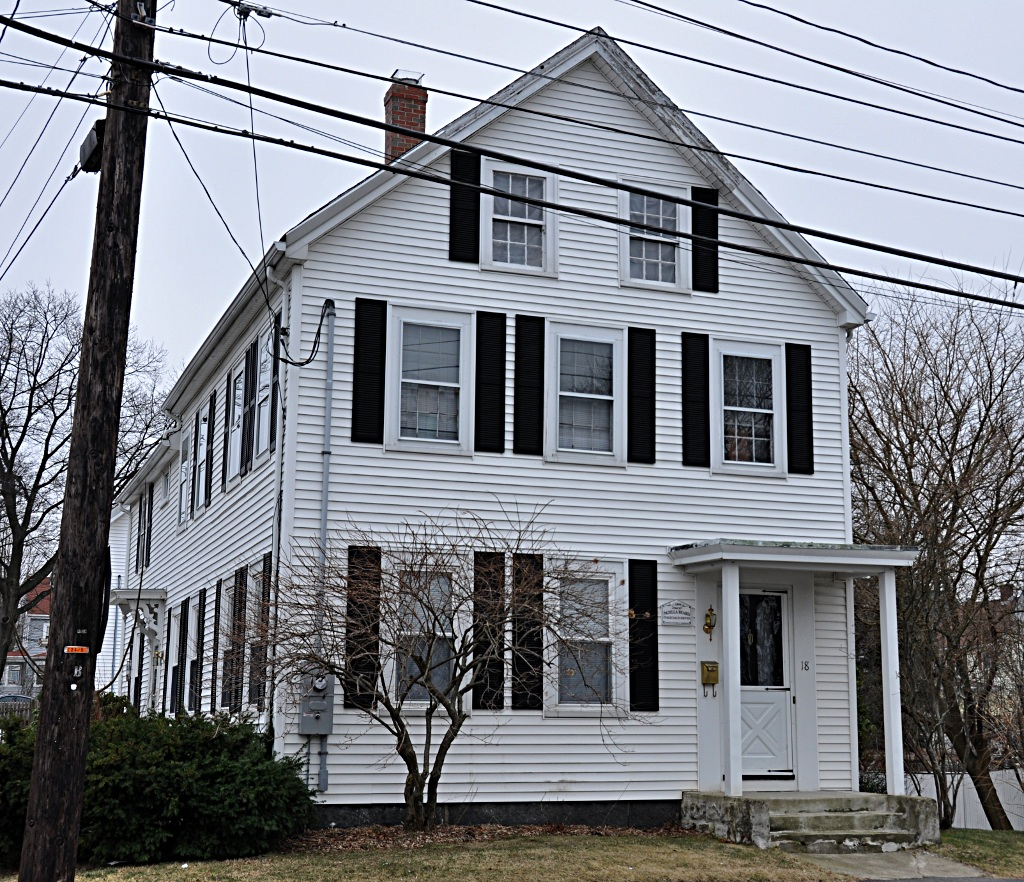

- Location within Massachusetts Location within the United States
- Location: 18 Maple St., Stoneham, Massachusetts
- Coordinates: 42°28′35″N 71°6′11″W
- Built: 1850
- Architectural style: Greek Revival
- MPS: Stoneham MRA
- NRHP reference No.: 84002507
- Added to NRHP: April 13, 1984

The Padilla Beard House is a historic house at 18 Maple Street in Stoneham, Massachusetts. Built about 1850, it was listed on the National Register of Historic Places in 1984 for its association with Padilla Beard, the first operator the stagecoach line on the route between Boston and Reading. The house was listed on the National Register of Historic Places in 1984.

== Description and history ==
The Padilla Beard House stands in a residential area one block west of Stoneham's Central Square, at the southwest corner of Maple and Wright Streets. It is a 2 1/2-story wood-frame structure, with a gabled roof and exterior finished in synthetic siding. At the time of its National Register listing in 1984, it exhibited modest Greek Revival features, including corner pilasters, which have been lost or obscured by the siding. The front facade is three bays wide, with the entrance in the rightmost bay under a simple porch with square posts. A secondary entrance is located in a two-story rear ell, facing Wright Street, which is sheltered by an Italianate hood.

The house was built c. 1850 for Padilla Beard, the first coach driver on the stagecoach line connecting Boston and Reading. Beard stabled the horses in a separate building (now 26 Wright Street). The stagecoach began operations in 1833, and was replaced in 1859 by a horsecar line, and by a full railroad line in 1861. Beard became a conductor of the railroad when it began service. The house is not significant for its architecture, but its relationship to the town's transportation history.

== See also ==
- National Register of Historic Places listings in Stoneham, Massachusetts
- National Register of Historic Places listings in Middlesex County, Massachusetts
