= House at 391 William Street =

Historic house in Massachusetts, United States

- House at 391 Williams Street
- U.S. National Register of Historic Places
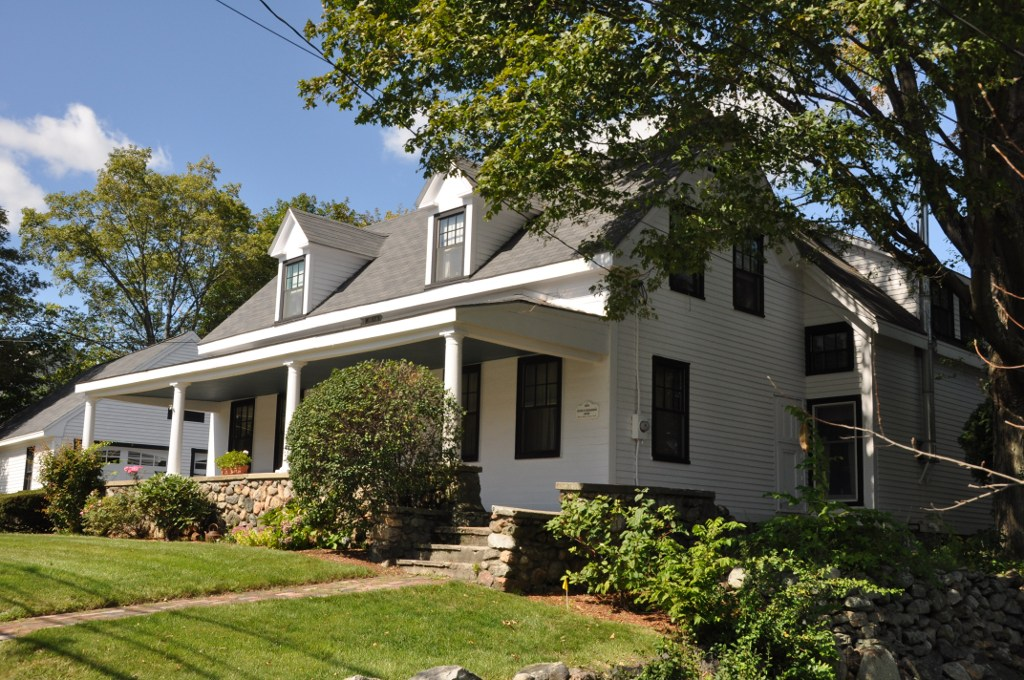

- Location within Massachusetts Location within the United States
- Location: 391 Williams St., Stoneham, Massachusetts
- Coordinates: 42°29′23″N 71°6′39″W
- Built: 1820
- Architectural style: Greek Revival
- MPS: Stoneham MRA
- NRHP reference No.: 84002688
- Added to NRHP: April 13, 1984

The House at 391 Williams Street in Stoneham, Massachusetts, is one of the town's more elaborate early Greek Revival cottage. Built c. 1820, it is a 1 1/2-story five-bay wood-frame structure, with a single story rear ell. Its most prominent features are the front gable dormers, which appear to be original to the period, and its full-width front porch, which is probably an early 20th-century addition. Its windows have molded surrounds, and the main entrance is flanked by sidelight windows.

The house was listed on the National Register of Historic Places in 1984.

== See also ==
- National Register of Historic Places listings in Stoneham, Massachusetts
- National Register of Historic Places listings in Middlesex County, Massachusetts
