= Charles Gill House =

Historic house in Massachusetts, United States

- U.S. National Register of Historic Places
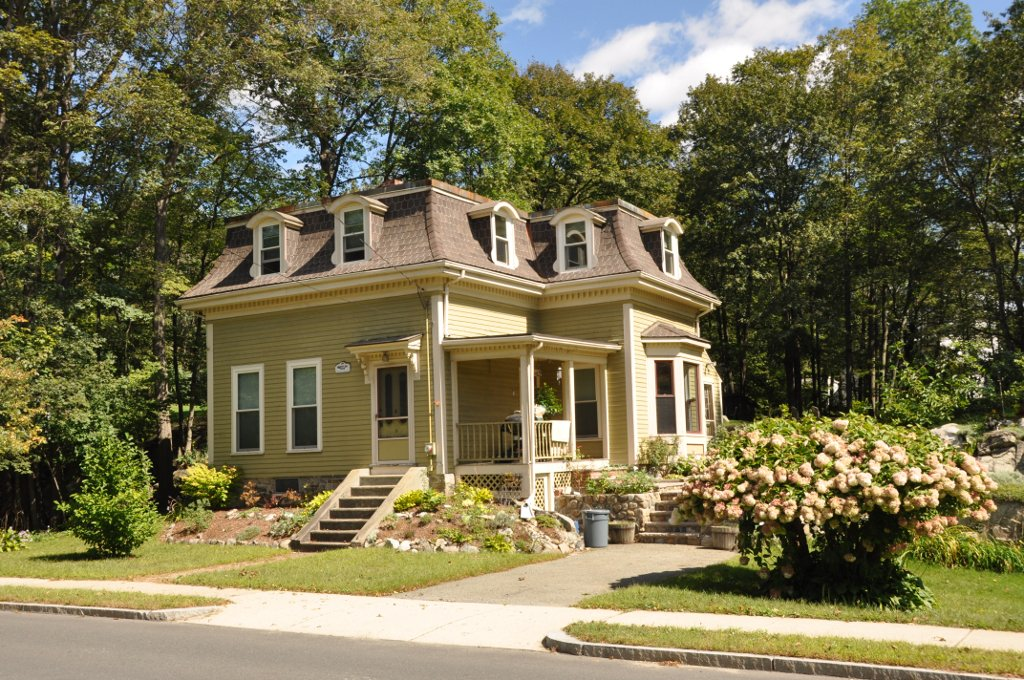

- Location within Massachusetts Location within the United States
- Location: 76 Pleasant St., Stoneham, Massachusetts
- Coordinates: 42°28′38″N 71°5′35″W
- Built: 1860
- Architectural style: Second Empire, Mansard
- MPS: Stoneham MRA
- NRHP reference No.: 84002623
- Added to NRHP: April 13, 1984

The Charles Gill House is a historic house at 76 Pleasant Street in Stoneham, Massachusetts. It is one of three well preserved Second Empire worker's cottages in Stoneham. It was built c. 1860 for Charles Gill, a shoemaker. The house as two stories, the upper one under a mansard roof, with single-window dormers topped by segmented-arches piercing the steeper roof line. The house follows a basic side hall plan, except there is a projecting ell to the right, with a porch in the crook of the ell.

The house was listed on the National Register of Historic Places in 1984.

== See also ==
- National Register of Historic Places listings in Stoneham, Massachusetts
- National Register of Historic Places listings in Middlesex County, Massachusetts
