= Samuel Chamberlain House =

Historic house in Massachusetts, United States

- U.S. National Register of Historic Places
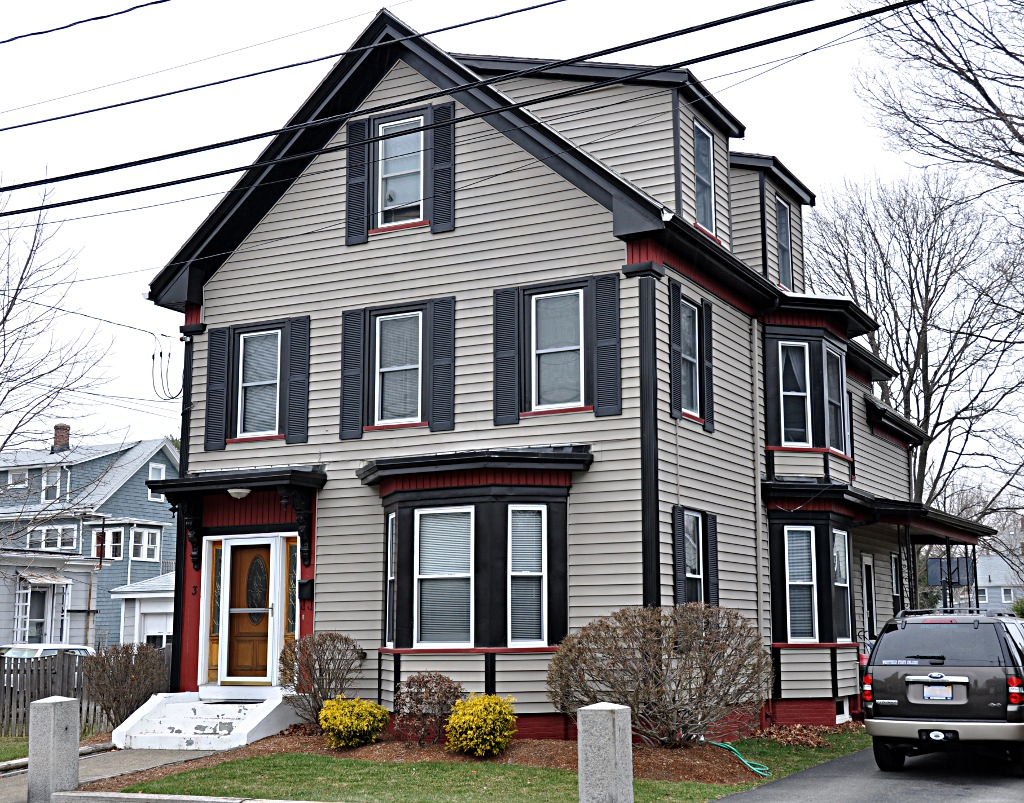

- Location within Massachusetts Location within the United States
- Location: 3 Winthrop St., Stoneham, Massachusetts
- Coordinates: 42°28′32″N 71°6′13″W
- Built: 1864
- Architectural style: Italianate
- MPS: Stoneham MRA
- NRHP reference No.: 84002536
- Added to NRHP: April 13, 1984

The Samuel Chamberlain House is a historic house at 3 Winthrop Street in Stoneham, Massachusetts. Built c. 1864, it is one of three well preserved Italianate side-hall style houses in Stoneham. It was listed on the National Register of Historic Places in 1984.

== Description and history ==
The Samuel Chamberlain House stands in a residential area southwest of Stoneham's Central Square, on the north side of Winthrop Street between Wright and Lincoln Streets. It is a 2 1/2-story wood-frame house, set on a small lot lined at the sidewalk with granite, including original posts at the sidewalk and driveway. It is capped with a dormered gable roof and its exterior is finished in vinyl siding. It was listed on the National Register in part for its architectural merit, but many of its exterior features, including corner pilasters, first floor window projecting caps, and paneling beneath windows in its polygonal bays, have been lost or obscured, and the Italianate carriage house has been demolished. The entry has a decorative projecting hood.

The house was built about 1864, and represents a type of house, the side-hall entry plan, of which only three survive in the town. The house was built for Samuel W. Chamberlain, a manufacturer, inventor and patent-holder on machinery related to the manufacture of shoes. His most notable work was a machine for burnishing shoe heels.

== See also ==
- National Register of Historic Places listings in Stoneham, Massachusetts
- National Register of Historic Places listings in Middlesex County, Massachusetts
