= Caleb Wiley House =

Historic house in Massachusetts, United States

- U.S. National Register of Historic Places
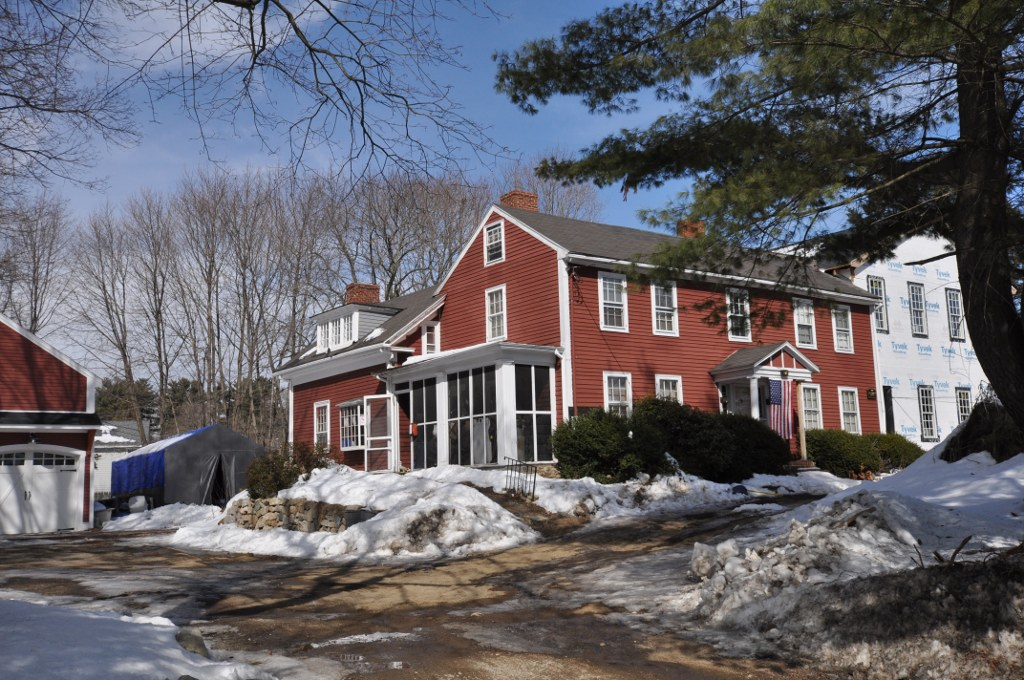

- Location within Massachusetts Location within the United States
- Location: 125 North St., Stoneham, Massachusetts
- Coordinates: 42°29′54″N 71°6′27″W
- Built: 1826
- Architectural style: Federal
- MPS: Stoneham MRA
- NRHP reference No.: 84002848
- Added to NRHP: April 13, 1984

The Caleb Wiley House is a historic house at 125 North Street in Stoneham, Massachusetts. Built c. 1826, this 2 1/2-story wood-frame house is one of Stonham's best-preserved late Federal period houses. The house was listed on the National Register of Historic Places in 1984.

== Description and history ==
The Caleb Wiley House is set on the north side of North Street, a major east–west route through residential areas of northwestern Stoneham, amid 20th-century residential houses that are mostly on smaller lots. It is a 2 1/2-story wood-frame house, five bays wide, with a side-gable roof, twin rear-wall chimneys, clapboard siding, and a granite foundation. Window and door surrounds are simple, with the second-floor windows butting against the cornice, a typical Federal period feature. Its front door is sheltered by a portico that is early 20th century in appearance, and has flanking sidelight windows. A screen porch is attached to the left side, and a modern addition is attached to the rear.

The house was built about 1826 by Caleb Wiley, at a time when North Street was lined with larger properties mainly in agricultural use. The original 47-acre (19 ha) lot of this house has long since been subdivided into residences, but this property retains mature plantings, and the main house is relatively little-altered since its construction.

== See also ==
- National Register of Historic Places listings in Stoneham, Massachusetts
- National Register of Historic Places listings in Middlesex County, Massachusetts
