= Almshouse (Stoneham, Massachusetts) =

- U.S. National Register of Historic Places
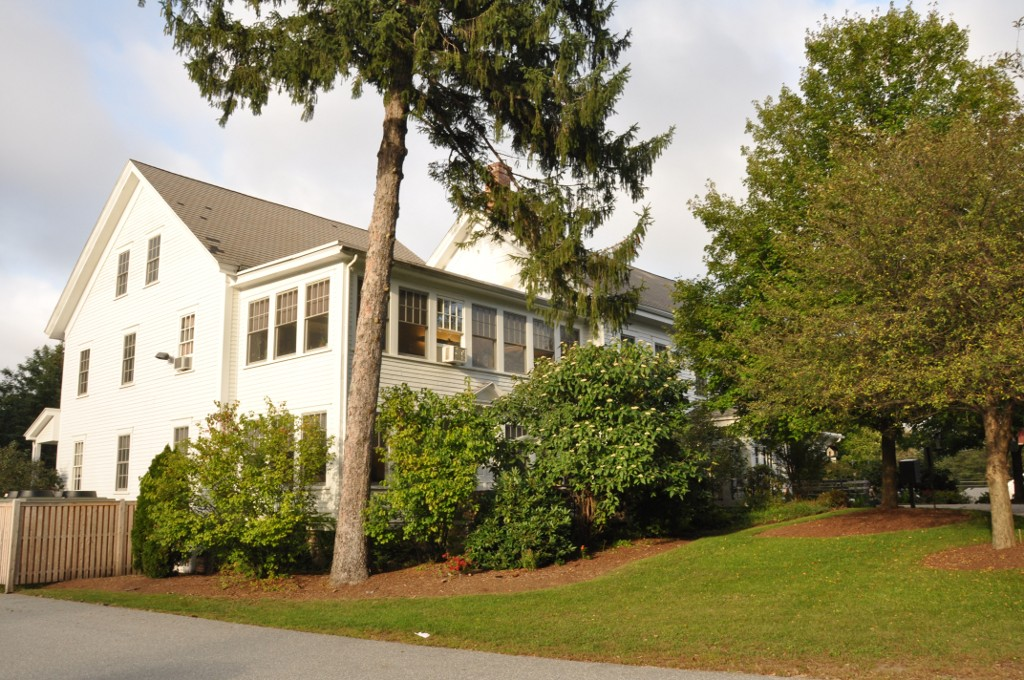

- Location within Massachusetts Location within the United States
- Location: 136 Elm St., Stoneham, Massachusetts
- Coordinates: 42°29′30″N 71°5′17″W
- Area: 2 acres (0.81 ha)
- Built: 1852
- Architectural style: Greek Revival
- MPS: Stoneham MRA
- NRHP reference No.: 84002464
- Added to NRHP: April 13, 1984

The Almshouse is a historic almshouse in Stoneham, Massachusetts. Built in 1852, it is one of the few surviving buildings of this type in the Greater Boston area. It is now part of the Stoneham Senior Center, and was listed on the National Register of Historic Places in 1984.

== Description and history ==
The former Stoneham Almshouse is located in eastern Stoneham, near the town line with Wakefield on the north side of Elm Street. It is a 2 1/2-story wood-frame structure, with a gabled roof, clapboarded exterior, and granite foundation. It basically a functional vernacular structure, with minimal Greek Revival styling found in the main entrance surround. The interior follows a relatively retardaire (out-of-date for the period) central hall plan. The original building has been encrusted with additions to the sides and rear.

The almshouse was built in 1852 to provide facilities for the town's indigent adult population. It was the town's second such facility, and is now one of the few in the region to survive. Its original 17-acre (6.9 ha) lot has been reduced to just two by subdivision and development, but it retains its original long entry drive. It served for a time in the 20th century as a nursing home, and now houses the town's senior center.

== See also ==
- National Register of Historic Places listings in Stoneham, Massachusetts
- National Register of Historic Places listings in Middlesex County, Massachusetts
