= National Register of Historic Places listings in Stoneham, Massachusetts =

Location of Stoneham in Massachusetts

This is a list of properties and historic districts in Stoneham, Massachusetts, that are listed on the National Register of Historic Places.

The locations of National Register properties and districts (at least for all showing latitude and longitude coordinates below) may be seen in an online map by clicking on "Map of all coordinates".

This National Park Service list is complete through NPS recent listings posted May 1, 2026.

== Current listings ==
	Name on the Register	Image	Date listed	Location	City or town	Description
1	Almshouse	Almshouse	April 13, 1984 (#84002464)	136 Elm St. 42°29′30″N 71°05′17″W		
2	Padilla Beard House	Padilla Beard House	April 13, 1984 (#84002507)	18 Maple St. 42°28′43″N 71°06′07″W		
3	Boston and Maine Railroad Depot	Boston and Maine Railroad Depot	April 13, 1984 (#84002510)	36 Pine St. 42°28′42″N 71°05′50″W		
4	John Bottume House	John Bottume House	April 13, 1984 (#84002513)	4 Woodland Rd. 42°27′14″N 71°05′30″W		
5	C.H. Brown Cottage	C.H. Brown Cottage	April 13, 1984 (#84002525)	34 Wright St. 42°28′44″N 71°06′07″W		
6	William Bryant Octagon House	William Bryant Octagon House	April 13, 1984 (#84002526)	2 Spring St. 42°28′54″N 71°05′40″W		
7	Charles Buck House	Charles Buck House	April 13, 1984 (#84002527)	68 Pleasant St. 42°28′46″N 71°05′36″W		
8	Clara Buswell House	Clara Buswell House	April 13, 1984 (#84002528)	481 Main St. 42°28′31″N 71°06′05″W		
9	Central Square Historic District	Central Square Historic District	January 17, 1990 (#89002277)	Roughly bounded by Main, Central, Church, Winter and Common Sts. 42°28′51″N 71°05′59″W		
10	Samuel Chamberlain House	Samuel Chamberlain House	April 13, 1984 (#84002536)	3 Winthrop St. 42°28′31″N 71°06′10″W		
11	Bernard Cogan House	Bernard Cogan House	April 13, 1984 (#84002546)	10 Flint Ave. 42°28′59″N 71°06′04″W		
12	James Cogan House	James Cogan House	April 13, 1984 (#84002550)	48 Elm St. 42°29′14″N 71°05′50″W		
13	Colonial Beacon Gas Station	Colonial Beacon Gas Station	April 13, 1984 (#84002554)	474 Main St. 42°28′33″N 71°06′02″W		
14	George Cowdrey House	George Cowdrey House	April 13, 1984 (#84002557)	42 High St. 42°29′33″N 71°05′41″W		
15	Blake Daniels Cottage	Blake Daniels Cottage	April 13, 1984 (#84002562)	111–113 Elm St. 42°29′20″N 71°05′29″W		
16	Silas Dean House	Silas Dean House	April 13, 1984 (#84002565)	8 Pine St. 42°28′51″N 71°05′52″W		
17	Dow Block	Dow Block	April 13, 1984 (#84002570)	Central Square; 42°28′45″N 71°06′02″W		
18	E. A. Durgin House	E. A. Durgin House	April 13, 1984 (#84002572)	113 Summer St. 42°28′42″N 71°05′40″W		
19	Amasa Farrier Boardinghouse	Amasa Farrier Boardinghouse	April 13, 1984 (#84002601)	280 Main St. 42°29′01″N 71°06′00″W		
20	Amasa Farrier House	Amasa Farrier House	April 13, 1984 (#84002605)	55 Central St. 42°28′53″N 71°05′55″W		
21	First Baptist Church	First Baptist Church	April 13, 1984 (#84002607)	461 Main St. 42°28′36″N 71°06′03″W		
22	First Congregational Church	First Congregational Church	April 13, 1984 (#84002609)	Main and Church Sts. 42°28′51″N 71°06′00″W		
23	First Unitarian Church	First Unitarian Church	April 13, 1984 (#84002612)	Central and Common Sts. 42°28′52″N 71°05′55″W		
24	Michael Foley Cottage	Michael Foley Cottage	April 13, 1984 (#84002614)	14 Emerson St. 42°28′47″N 71°05′54″W		
25	Walter K. Foster House	Walter K. Foster House	April 13, 1984 (#84002616)	57 Central St. 42°28′54″N 71°05′56″W		
26	Enoch Fuller House	Enoch Fuller House	April 13, 1984 (#84002619)	72 Pine St. 42°28′32″N 71°05′55″W		
27	William Griffin Fuller House	William Griffin Fuller House	April 13, 1984 (#84002621)	32 Franklin St. 42°28′43″N 71°05′57″W		
28	Charles Gill House	Charles Gill House	April 13, 1984 (#84002623)	76 Pleasant St. 42°28′38″N 71°05′35″W		
29	Onslow Gilmore House	Onslow Gilmore House	April 13, 1984 (#84002625)	477 Main St. 42°28′32″N 71°06′04″W		
30	Jonathan Green House	Jonathan Green House	April 13, 1984 (#84002627)	63 Perkins St. 42°28′01″N 71°04′50″W		
31	Lorenzo D. Hawkins House	Lorenzo D. Hawkins House	April 13, 1984 (#84002639)	1 Cedar Ave. 42°28′48″N 71°06′16″W		
32	Benjamin Hibbard Residence	Benjamin Hibbard Residence	April 13, 1984 (#84002642)	5–7 Gerry St. 42°28′30″N 71°06′01″W		
33	Sidney A. Hill House	Sidney A. Hill House	April 13, 1984 (#84002645)	31 Chestnut St. 42°28′44″N 71°06′16″W		
34	House at 6 S. Marble Street	House at 6 S. Marble Street	April 13, 1984 (#84002690)	6 S. Marble St. 42°28′20″N 71°06′20″W		
35	House at 19 Tremont Street	House at 19 Tremont Street	April 13, 1984 (#84002671)	19 Tremont St. 42°29′09″N 71°05′49″W		
36	House at 107 William Street	House at 107 William Street	April 13, 1984 (#84002660)	107 William St. 42°29′03″N 71°05′56″W		
37	House at 114 Marble Street	House at 114 Marble Street	April 13, 1984 (#84002661)	114 Marble St. 42°28′23″N 71°06′22″W		
38	House at 269 Green Street	House at 269 Green Street	April 13, 1984 (#84002682)	269 Green St. 42°29′27″N 71°05′05″W		
39	House at 391 William Street	House at 391 William Street	April 13, 1984 (#84002688)	391 William St. 42°29′23″N 71°06′39″W		
40	Franklin B. Jenkins House	Franklin B. Jenkins House	April 13, 1984 (#84002702)	35 Chestnut St. 42°28′44″N 71°06′14″W		
41	Franklin B. Jenkins House	Franklin B. Jenkins House	April 13, 1984 (#84002699)	2 Middle St. 42°28′31″N 71°05′59″W		
42	John Jones House	John Jones House	April 13, 1984 (#84002708)	1 Winthrop St. 42°28′31″N 71°06′09″W		
43	Thomas W. Jones House	Thomas W. Jones House	April 13, 1984 (#84002716)	34 Warren St. 42°28′31″N 71°06′09″W		
44	Walter Keene House	Walter Keene House	April 13, 1984 (#84002719)	28 High St. 42°29′23″N 71°05′44″W		
45	David Kenney House	David Kenney House	April 13, 1984 (#84002725)	67 Summer St. 42°28′30″N 71°05′42″W		
46	Elisha Knight Homestead	Elisha Knight Homestead	April 13, 1984 (#84002863)	170 Franklin St. 42°28′28″N 71°05′10″W		Listed in error as "Elisha Wright Homestead".
47	Newton Lamson House	Newton Lamson House	April 13, 1984 (#84002727)	33 Chestnut St. 42°28′46″N 71°06′16″W		
48	Locke-Baldwin-Kinsley House	Locke-Baldwin-Kinsley House	April 13, 1984 (#84002742)	45 Green St. 42°29′00″N 71°05′24″W		
49	T.U. Lyon House	T.U. Lyon House	April 13, 1984 (#84002743)	9 Warren St. 42°28′39″N 71°06′07″W		
50	Metropolitan District Commission Pumping House	Metropolitan District Commission Pumping House	April 13, 1984 (#84002747)	Woodland Rd. 42°27′21″N 71°05′27″W		
51	Middlesex Fells Reservation Parkways	Middlesex Fells Reservation Parkways	February 4, 2003 (#02001749)	E. Border Rd., Fellsway E., Fellsway W., Hillcrest Parkway, South St., Pond St., S. Border Rd., Ravine Rd., and Woodland Rd. 42°26′43″N 71°06′10″W		Extends into Malden, Medford, Melrose, and Winchester.
52	Middlesex Fells Reservoirs Historic District	Middlesex Fells Reservoirs Historic District	January 18, 1990 (#89002249)	Roughly bounded by Pond St., Woodland Rd., Interstate 93, and Massachusetts Route 28; 42°27′18″N 71°05′43″W		Roughly the portion of the Middlesex Fells Reservation east of I-93.
53	Millard-Souther-Green House	Millard-Souther-Green House	April 13, 1984 (#84002752)	218 Green St. 42°29′14″N 71°05′14″W		
54	Nobility Hill Historic District	Nobility Hill Historic District	February 9, 1990 (#89002328)	Roughly bounded by Chestnut and Maple Sts. and Cedar Ave. 42°28′46″N 71°06′19″W		
55	Oddfellows Building	Oddfellows Building	April 13, 1984 (#84002765)	Central Square; 42°28′51″N 71°05′59″W		
56	Old Burying Ground	Old Burying Ground	April 13, 1984 (#84002766)	Pleasant and William Sts. 42°28′53″N 71°05′48″W		
57	Shoe Shop-Doucette Ten Footer	Shoe Shop-Doucette Ten Footer	April 13, 1984 (#84002821)	36 William St. 42°28′58″N 71°05′49″W		On the grounds of the Stoneham Historical Society.
58	South School	South School	April 13, 1984 (#84002828)	9–11 Gerry St. 42°28′31″N 71°05′59″W		
59	Spot Pond Archeological District	Spot Pond Archeological District	July 24, 1992 (#92000925)	Virginia Woods section of Middlesex Fells Reservation; 42°27′22″N 71°05′13″W		
60	John Steele House	John Steele House	April 13, 1984 (#84002829)	2–4 Montvale St. 42°28′54″N 71°06′04″W		
61	Stoneham Firestation	Stoneham Firestation	April 13, 1984 (#84002831)	Central and Emerson Sts. 42°28′46″N 71°05′59″W		
62	Stoneham Public Library	Stoneham Public Library	April 13, 1984 (#84002832)	Main and Maple Sts. 42°28′39″N 71°06′04″W		
63	Warren Sweetser House	Warren Sweetser House	May 26, 2005 (#05000466)	90 Franklin St. 42°28′39″N 71°05′48″W		
64	Jesse Tay House	Jesse Tay House	April 13, 1984 (#84002834)	51 Elm St. 42°29′13″N 71°05′48″W		
65	R.P. Turnbull House	R.P. Turnbull House	April 13, 1984 (#84002839)	6 Pine St. 42°28′53″N 71°05′52″W		
66	Caleb Wiley House	Caleb Wiley House	April 13, 1984 (#84002848)	125 North St. 42°29′54″N 71°06′27″W		
67	Micah Williams House	Micah Williams House	April 13, 1984 (#84002851)	342 William St. 42°29′21″N 71°06′28″W		
68	Williams-Linscott House	Williams-Linscott House	April 13, 1984 (#84002853)	357 William St. 42°29′21″N 71°06′29″W		Demolished; architectural parts preserved.
69	Charles Wood House	Charles Wood House	April 13, 1984 (#84002860)	34 Chestnut St. 42°28′46″N 71°06′12″W		
