= Elisha Knight Homestead =

Historic house in Massachusetts, United States

- U.S. National Register of Historic Places
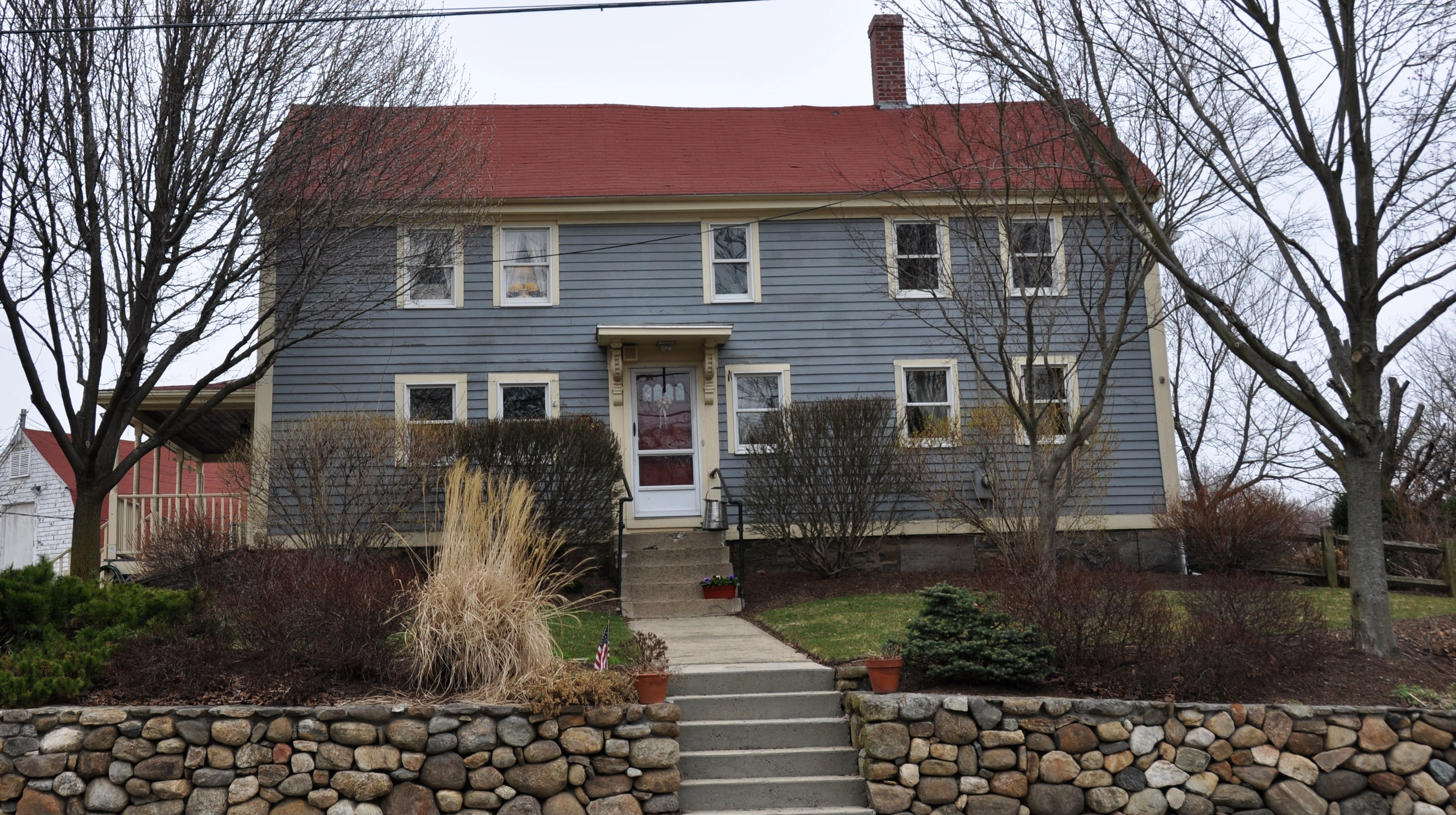

- Location within Massachusetts Location within the United States
- Location: 170 Franklin St., Stoneham, Massachusetts
- Coordinates: 42.47458°N 71.0862°W
- Built: 1750
- Architectural style: Colonial
- MPS: Stoneham MRA
- NRHP reference No.: 84002863
- Added to NRHP: April 13, 1984

The Elisha Knight (formerly erroneously Wright) Homestead is a historic house at 170 Franklin Street in Stoneham, Massachusetts. Built c. 1750, it is the only property of that period in Stoneham that retains a rural setting. The two-story wood-frame house has relatively modest decorations; its decorated entry hood dates to a c. 1870 renovation that probably also removed a central chimney, replacing it with one at the east end.

The house was listed on the National Register of Historic Places in 1984 as the "Elisha Wright Homestead"; a name correction to "Elisha Knight Homestead" was recorded by the state in 2011.

== See also ==
- National Register of Historic Places listings in Stoneham, Massachusetts
- National Register of Historic Places listings in Middlesex County, Massachusetts
