= South School (Stoneham, Massachusetts) =

- U.S. National Register of Historic Places
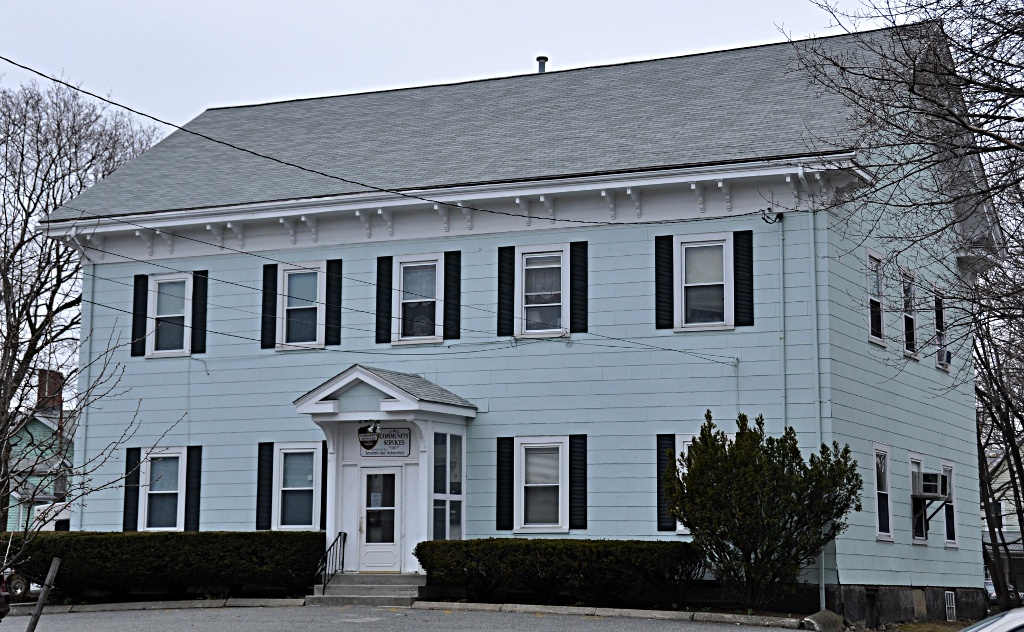

- Location within Massachusetts Location within the United States
- Location: 9–11 Gerry Street, Stoneham, Massachusetts
- Coordinates: 42°28′31″N 71°6′2″W
- Built: 1857
- Architectural style: Italianate
- MPS: Stoneham MRA
- NRHP reference No.: 84002828
- Added to NRHP: April 13, 1984

The South School is a historic school building in Stoneham, Massachusetts. It is the best preserved 19th century schoolhouse in Stoneham. The two-story wood-frame building housed two classrooms on each of its two floors, and was built c. 1857–58, at a time when many schoolhouses in the state were typically single story buildings with one or two classrooms. The building saw academic use well into the 20th century before being converted to other uses. It has retained its basic form, as well exterior Italianate features.

The building was listed on the National Register of Historic Places in 1984. It presently houses community social services agencies.

== See also ==
- National Register of Historic Places listings in Stoneham, Massachusetts
- National Register of Historic Places listings in Middlesex County, Massachusetts
