= House at 107 William Street =

Historic house in Massachusetts, United States

- U.S. National Register of Historic Places
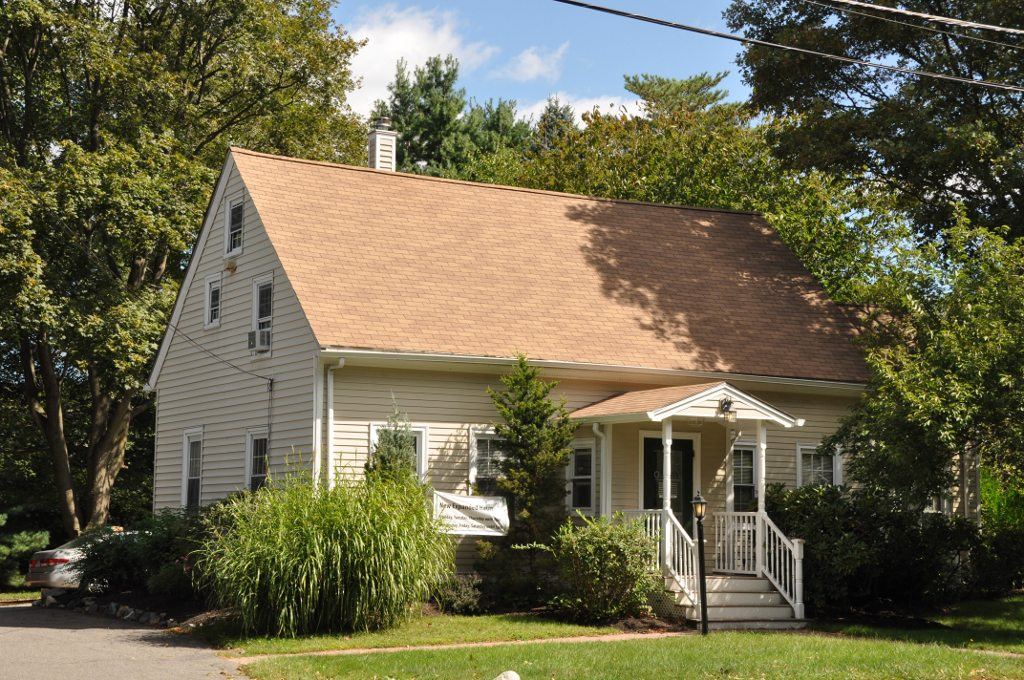

- Location within Massachusetts Location within the United States
- Location: 107 William St., Stoneham, Massachusetts
- Coordinates: 42°29′3″N 71°5′56″W
- Built: 1825
- Architectural style: Greek Revival
- MPS: Stoneham MRA
- NRHP reference No.: 84002660
- Added to NRHP: April 13, 1984

The House at 107 William Street in Stoneham, Massachusetts, is a well-preserved early Greek Revival cottage. Built in the 1820s, it is a 1 1/2-story wood-frame house, five bays wide, with a side-gable roof, clapboard siding, and a granite foundation. It has a projecting central entry and an ell on its east side, set on a brick foundation. The ell has a second entry, indicating it may have been used as a shop. The main entry has sidelights, and both entries have a narrow transom. It is one of a small number of surviving buildings of a larger cluster that once stood near the junction of William and Main Streets.

The house was listed on the National Register of Historic Places in 1984.

== See also ==
- National Register of Historic Places listings in Stoneham, Massachusetts
- National Register of Historic Places listings in Middlesex County, Massachusetts
