= Silas Dean House =

Historic house in Massachusetts, United States

- U.S. National Register of Historic Places
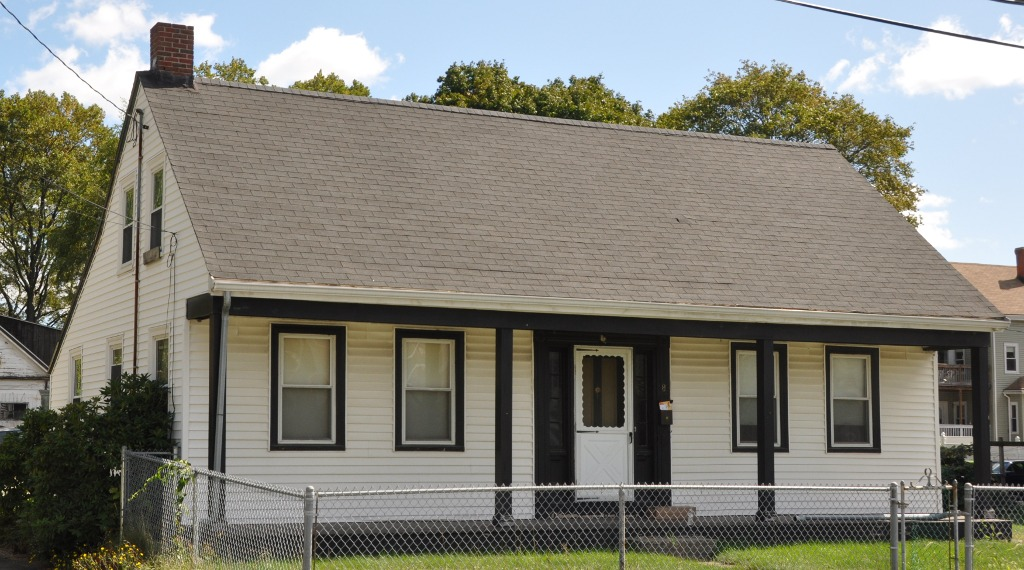

- Location within Massachusetts Location within the United States
- Location: 8 Pine St., Stoneham, Massachusetts
- Coordinates: 42°28′51″N 71°5′52″W
- Built: 1840
- Architectural style: Greek Revival
- MPS: Stoneham MRA
- NRHP reference No.: 84002565
- Added to NRHP: April 13, 1984

The Silas Dean House is a historic house at 8 Pine Street in Stoneham, Massachusetts. Built c. 1840, it is a stylistically rare form of a Greek Revival cottage. The front of the house is a front porch sheltered by the slope of the roof, rather than a more traditional gable-end orientation.

The house was listed on the National Register of Historic Places in 1984. Period detailing present on the porch at the time of its listing, including turned posts and a bracketed frieze, has been lost by subsequent alterations (see photo).

== See also ==
- National Register of Historic Places listings in Stoneham, Massachusetts
- National Register of Historic Places listings in Middlesex County, Massachusetts
