= Michael Foley Cottage =

Historic house in Massachusetts, United States

- U.S. National Register of Historic Places
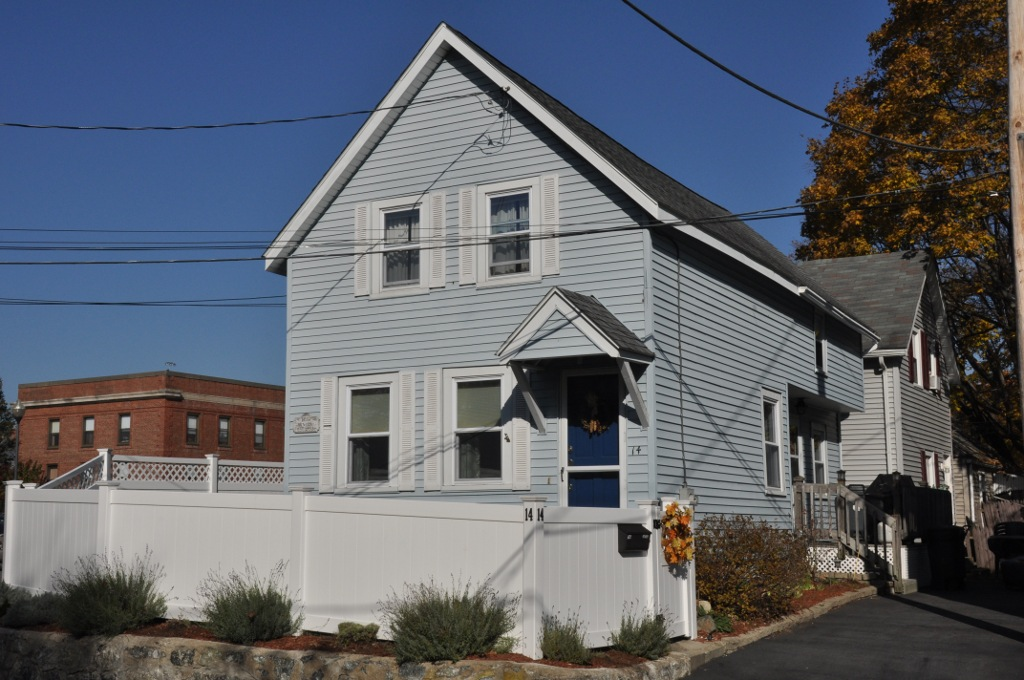

- Location within Massachusetts Location within the United States
- Location: 14 Emerson St., Stoneham, Massachusetts
- Coordinates: 42.47998°N 71.09906°W
- Built: 1855
- MPS: Stoneham MRA
- NRHP reference No.: 84002614
- Added to NRHP: April 13, 1984

The Michael Foley Cottage is a historic house at 14 Emerson Street in Stoneham, Massachusetts. It is a remarkably well preserved instance of a worker's cottage, built c. 1855. It was occupied until the 1870s by Michael Foley, a shoemaker who may have worked at the nearby Tidd shoe factory. It is a two-story wood-frame structure, with a front-gable roof, clapboard siding, and granite foundation. Its front facade has three narrow bays on the first floor and two on the second, with the entrance in the rightmost bay. Decorative woodwork is minimal.

The cottage was listed on the National Register of Historic Places in 1984.

== See also ==
- National Register of Historic Places listings in Stoneham, Massachusetts
- National Register of Historic Places listings in Middlesex County, Massachusetts
