= Blake Daniels Cottage =

Historic house in Massachusetts, United States

- U.S. National Register of Historic Places
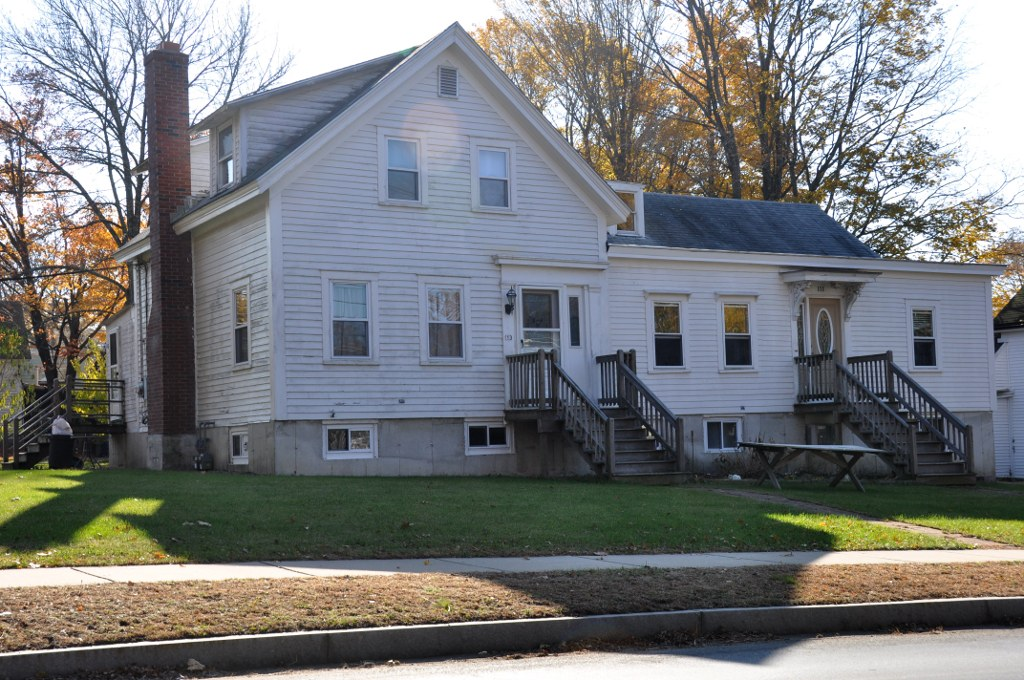

- Location within Massachusetts Location within the United States
- Location: 111–113 Elm St., Stoneham, Massachusetts
- Coordinates: 42°29′20″N 71°5′29″W
- Built: 1860
- Architectural style: Greek Revival
- MPS: Stoneham MRA
- NRHP reference No.: 84002562
- Added to NRHP: April 13, 1984

The Blake Daniels Cottage is a historic house at 111–113 Elm Street in Stoneham, Massachusetts. Built in 1860, it is a good example of a Greek Revival worker's residence, with an older wing that may have housed the manufactory of shoe lasts. The house was listed on the National Register of Historic Places in 1984.

== Description and history ==
The Blake Daniels Cottage stands in a residential area of eastern Stoneham, at the southwest corner of Elm Street and Duncklee Avenue. It is a tall 1 1/2-story wood-frame structure, with a gabled roof and clapboarded exterior. A single-story ell, possibly of earlier construction than the main house, extends to the west. The main block has a three bay facade, with the main entrance in the right bay, flanked on one side by a sidelight window, and framed by pilasters and a corniced entablature. The ell has a second entrance, sheltered by an Italianate hood. A brick chimney is set at the center of the eastern facade (facing Duncklee), with the roof on either side pierced by shed-roof dormers.

The house was built about 1860, and is among the better preserved of Stoneham's Greek Revival houses, as well as being an important site preserving part of Stoneham's early home-based shoe manufacturing businesses. Its owner, Blake Daniels, operated a small manufactory of shoe lasts at this location up to the 1870s. The manufacture of shoe parts and tools for shoe manufacture was a common cottage industry in the town at that time.

== See also ==
- National Register of Historic Places listings in Stoneham, Massachusetts
- National Register of Historic Places listings in Middlesex County, Massachusetts
