= Jesse Tay House =

Historic house in Massachusetts, United States

- U.S. National Register of Historic Places
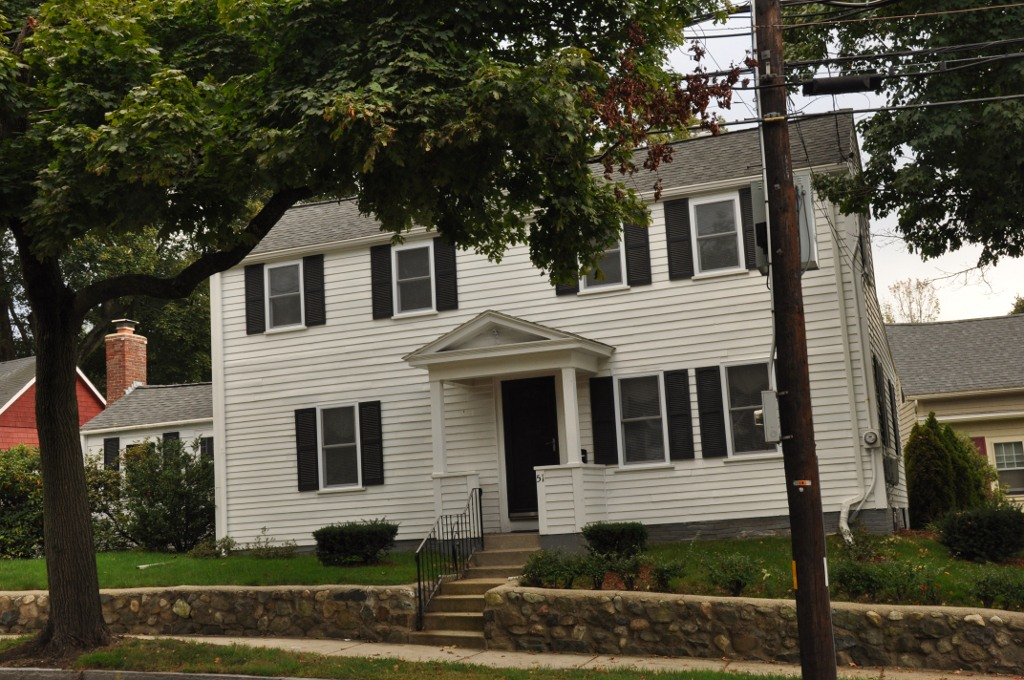

- Location within Massachusetts Location within the United States
- Location: 51 Elm St., Stoneham, Massachusetts
- Coordinates: 42°29′13″N 71°5′48″W
- Built: 1810
- Architectural style: Federal
- MPS: Stoneham MRA
- NRHP reference No.: 84002834
- Added to NRHP: April 13, 1984

The Jesse Tay House is a historic house at 51 Elm Street in Stoneham, Massachusetts. The two-story wood-frame house, built c. 1810 for Jesse Tay, is one of Stoneham's best-preserved Federal style houses. It has a side-gable roof, asymmetrically placed chimneys, and a four-bay facade with irregular placement of windows and entrance. The entrance is sheltered by a portico with a fully pedimented gable, and square supporting posts. Ells project to the rear and left side. Tay was a farmer and shoemaker, and it is possible that one of the additions was used by him or other family members for the home-based manufacture of shoes.

The house was listed on the National Register of Historic Places in 1984.

== See also ==
- National Register of Historic Places listings in Stoneham, Massachusetts
- National Register of Historic Places listings in Middlesex County, Massachusetts
