= Walter K. Foster House =

Historic house in Massachusetts, United States

- U.S. National Register of Historic Places
- U.S. Historic district – Contributing property
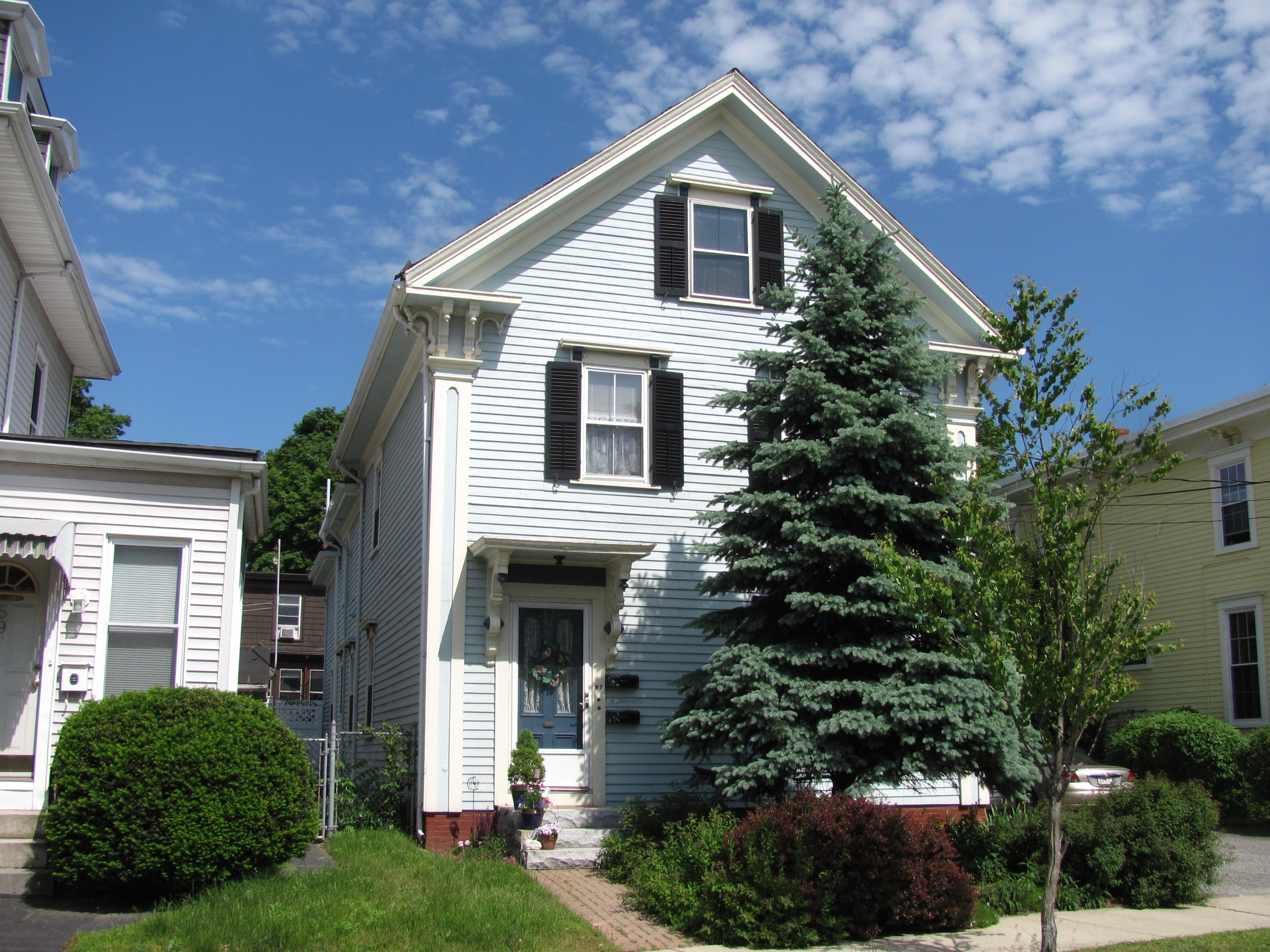
- Walter K. Foster House

- Location within Massachusetts Location within the United States
- Location: 57 Central St., Stoneham, Massachusetts
- Coordinates: 42°28′54″N 71°5′56″W
- Built: 1870
- Architectural style: Italianate
- Part of: Central Square Historic District (ID89002277)
- MPS: Stoneham MRA
- NRHP reference No.: 84002616

Significant dates
- Added to NRHP: April 13, 1984
- Designated CP: January 17, 1990

The Walter K. Foster House is a historic house at 57 Central Street in Stoneham, Massachusetts. Built c. 1870, it is one of three surviving Italianate side hall entry houses in Stoneham. Notable features include paneled pilasters on the corners and ornate decorative brackets above them. The doorway is also topped by a heavy decorated hood. Walter Kittredge Foster was an inventor and owner of a pencil sharpener factory.

The house was listed on the National Register of Historic Places in 1984, and included in the Central Square Historic District in 1990.

== See also ==
- National Register of Historic Places listings in Stoneham, Massachusetts
- National Register of Historic Places listings in Middlesex County, Massachusetts
