= William Griffin Fuller House =

Historic house in Massachusetts, United States

- U.S. National Register of Historic Places
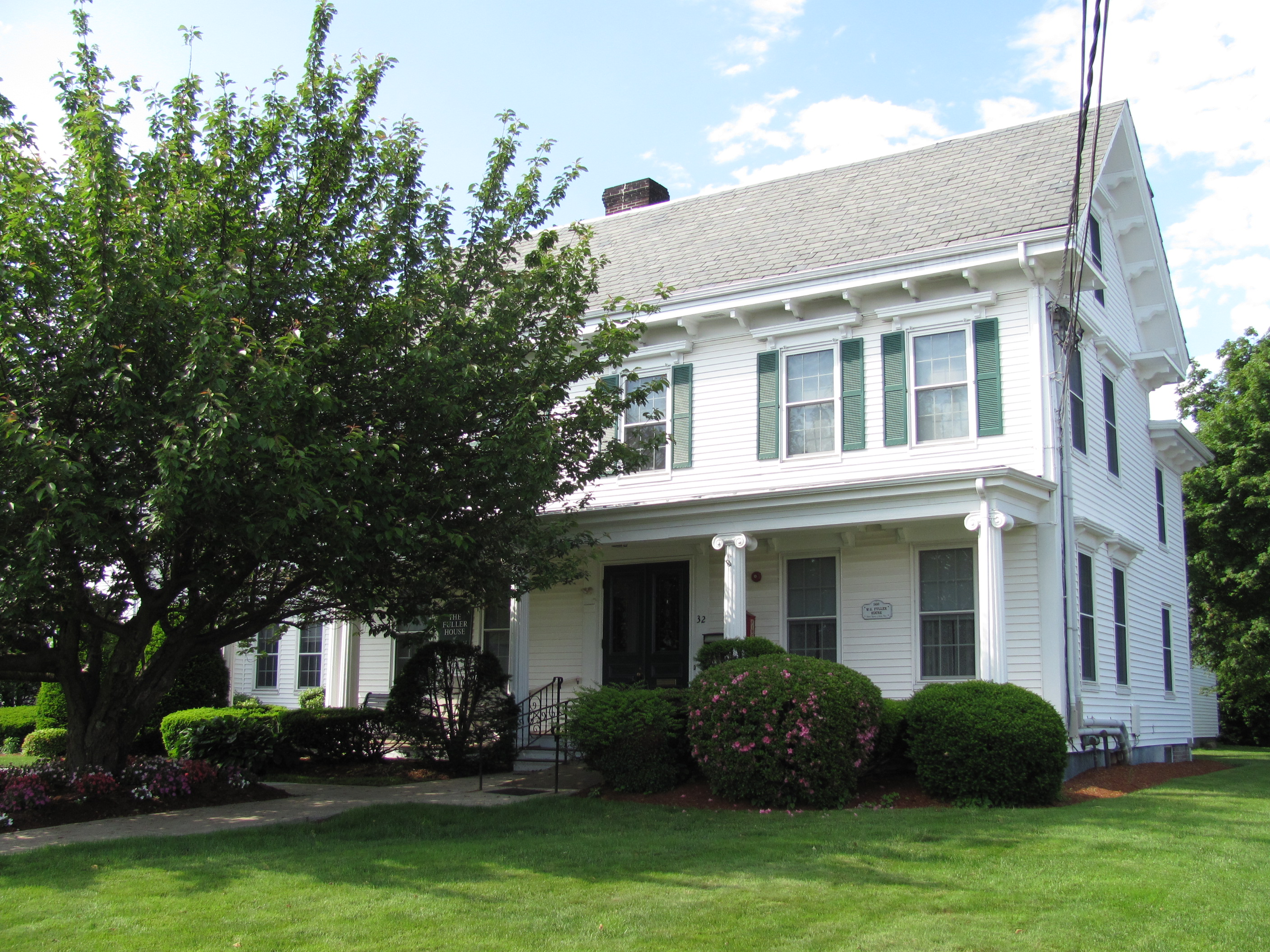
- William Griffin Fuller House

- Location within Massachusetts Location within the United States
- Location: 32 Franklin St., Stoneham, Massachusetts
- Coordinates: 42°28′43″N 71°5′57″W
- Built: 1850
- Architectural style: Greek Revival, Italianate
- MPS: Stoneham MRA
- NRHP reference No.: 84002621
- Added to NRHP: April 13, 1984

The William Griffin Fuller House is a historic house at 32 Franklin Street in Stoneham, Massachusetts. The two-story wood-frame house was built c. 1850 for William Griffin Fuller, a real estate developer and trustee of the Stoneham Five Cent Savings Bank. Its features are transitional, including both Greek Revival and Italianate details. The five-bay facade and single-story porch are Greek Revival, and the bracketing in the eaves and gable ends is Italianate in style.

The house was listed on the National Register of Historic Places in 1984.

== See also ==
- National Register of Historic Places listings in Stoneham, Massachusetts
- National Register of Historic Places listings in Middlesex County, Massachusetts
