= Charles Buck House =

Historic house in Massachusetts, United States

- U.S. National Register of Historic Places
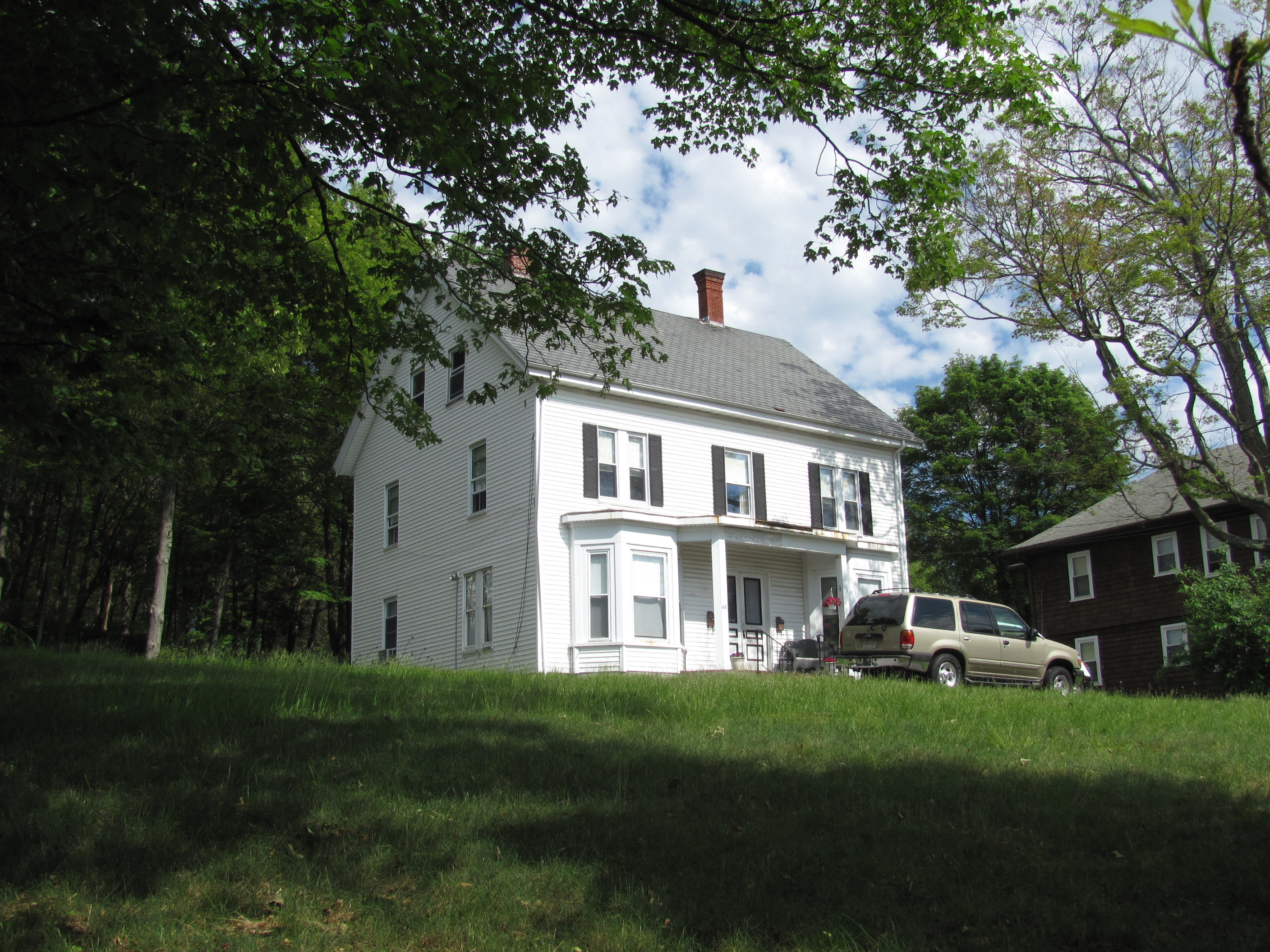
- Charles Buck House

- Location within Massachusetts Location within the United States
- Location: 68 Pleasant St., Stoneham, Massachusetts
- Coordinates: 42°28′46″N 71°5′36″W
- Built: 1880
- Architectural style: Italianate
- MPS: Stoneham MRA
- NRHP reference No.: 84002527
- Added to NRHP: April 13, 1984

The Charles Buck House is a historic house at 68 Pleasant Street in Stoneham, Massachusetts. Built about 1880 for a dealer in hide, this modest Italianate house occupies the site of Stoneham's first meetinghouse and school. It was listed on the National Register of Historic Places in 1984.

== Description and history ==
The Charles Buck House stands on a rise overlooking the junction of Summer and Pleasant Streets, a few blocks east of Stoneham's Central Square. This area was in the 18th century the town center, established after Stoneham was separated from Charlestown in 1725. The first meetinghouse (church), built in 1726, stood on this lot, roughly in front of where the house now stands, and the lot also held the town school (c. 1718). The house is a 2 1/2-story wood-frame structure, with a gabled roof and clapboarded exterior. It has a three-bay facade with bay windows flanking a center entry covered by an open porch. Its upper-story windows are headed by projecting lintels. Most of the windows are single sash, but some are paired sash windows set in a shared opening.

The house was built c. 1880 for Charles Buck, owner of a wholesale hide business. His main business was in Boston, but he also maintained a shop in Central Square. Buck's carriage barn also survives, but is standing on an adjacent lot.

== See also ==
- National Register of Historic Places listings in Stoneham, Massachusetts
- National Register of Historic Places listings in Middlesex County, Massachusetts
