= First Baptist Church (Stoneham, Massachusetts) =

Historic church in Massachusetts, United States

- U.S. National Register of Historic Places
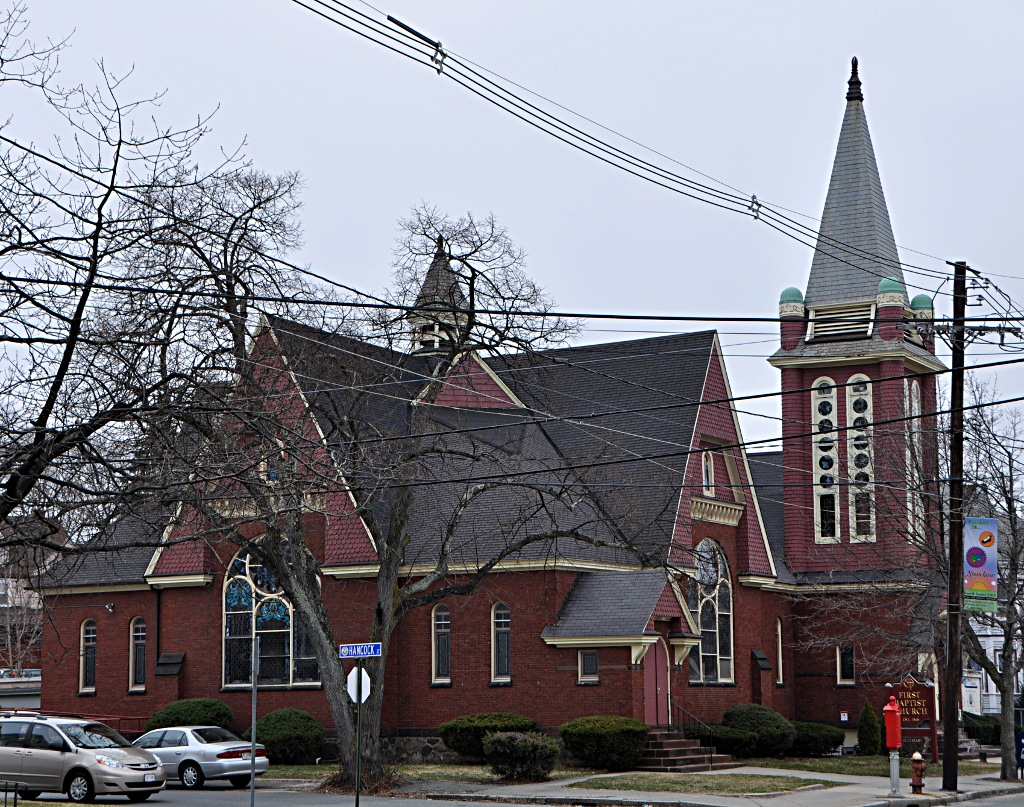

- Location within Massachusetts Location within the United States
- Location: Stoneham, Massachusetts
- Coordinates: 42°28′36″N 71°6′5″W
- Built: 1892
- Architect: Volk, L.B., & Sons
- Architectural style: Queen Anne
- MPS: Stoneham MRA
- NRHP reference No.: 84002607
- Added to NRHP: April 13, 1984

The First Baptist Church is a historic church building at 457 Main Street in Stoneham, Massachusetts, United States, housing an evangelical congregation. The church was built in 1892 and added to the National Register of Historic Places in 1984. It is one central Stoneham's three 19th-century churches, and is a fine local example of Queen Anne architecture.

== Description and history ==
The First Baptist Church is set on the west side of Main Street (Massachusetts Route 28), at the northwest corner with Hancock Street, just south of the town's central business district. It is a large brick building with a roughly rectangular footprint running parallel to Main Street. The roof is gabled, with cross-gables facing Main Street, and a two-story tower projecting from the main block between them. The gable ends are finished in wood shingles. The tower is in three stages, with an entry at the first level, a tall belfry stage with paired round-arch windows, and a four-sided steeple at the top.

The Baptist congregation was established in Stoneham in 1870, and met in a chapel on Common Street until this edifice was built in 1892 on the former estate of one of Stoneham's leading shoe manufacturers. The building is relatively little-altered since then; notably, its original slate roof has been replaced by asphalt shingles.

== Visiting information ==
There are a variety of activities hosted at the church in addition to the Sunday morning worship service. Visitors are always welcome - Sunday service starts at 10 am during the summer, and 11 am during the rest of the year.

== See also ==
- National Register of Historic Places listings in Stoneham, Massachusetts
- National Register of Historic Places listings in Middlesex County, Massachusetts
