= David Kenney House =

Historic house in Massachusetts, United States

- U.S. National Register of Historic Places
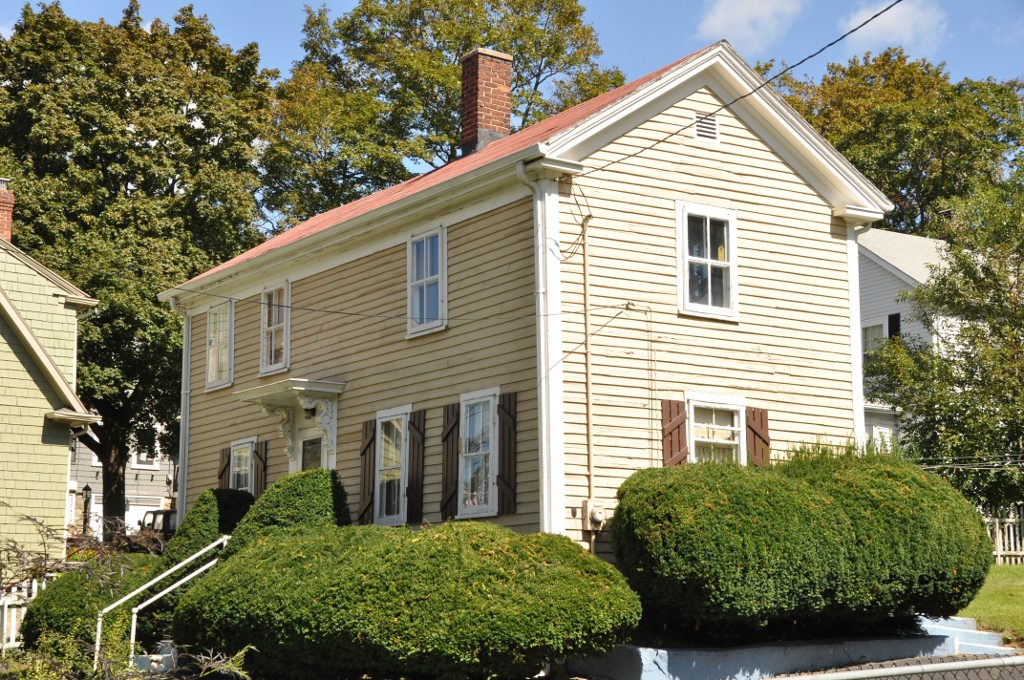

- Location within Massachusetts Location within the United States
- Location: 67 Summer St., Stoneham, Massachusetts
- Coordinates: 42°28′30″N 71°5′42″W
- Built: 1850
- MPS: Stoneham MRA
- NRHP reference No.: 84002725
- Added to NRHP: April 13, 1984

The David Kenney House is a historic house at 67 Summer Street in Stoneham, Massachusetts. Built c. 1850, the two-story wood-frame structure is a well-preserved worker's cottage, with a side-gable roof and a single interior chimney. Only one room deep, it has three irregularly placed windows on both the first and second floors, and an off-center front entry. It was listed as belonging to a laborer named David Kenney between 1858 and 1889. Its scrolled front entrance hood is probably a later addition.

The house was listed on the National Register of Historic Places in 1984.

== See also ==
- National Register of Historic Places listings in Stoneham, Massachusetts
- National Register of Historic Places listings in Middlesex County, Massachusetts
