= John Cowderoy =

English cricketer

John Cowderoy (19 April 1851 – 15 January 1934) was an English cricketer. He was a right-handed batsman and a left-arm roundarm bowler who played for Surrey. He was born in Battersea and died in Fulham.

Cowderoy made a single first-class appearance for the side, in 1876, against Nottinghamshire. He scored 2 runs in each innings in which he batted, in a game in which, in their first innings, Surrey finished 26 all out, a total which remained, for four years, their lowest total in first-class cricket.
