= William Bryant Octagon House =

Historic house in Massachusetts, United States

- U.S. National Register of Historic Places
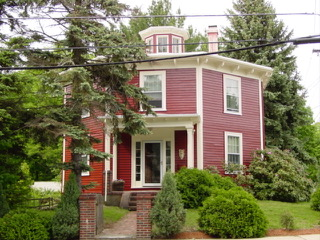

- Location within Massachusetts Location within the United States
- Location: 2 Spring Street, Stoneham, Massachusetts
- Coordinates: 42°28′54″N 71°5′40″W
- Built: 1850
- Built by: Worcester Bros.
- Architectural style: Octagon Mode
- MPS: Stoneham MRA
- NRHP reference No.: 84002526
- Added to NRHP: April 13, 1984

The William Bryant Octagon House is a historic octagon house located at 2 Spring Street in Stoneham, Massachusetts. Built in 1850, it is the best-preserved of three such houses built in the town in the 1850s. It was listed on the National Register of Historic Places in 1984.

== Description and history ==
The William Bryant Octagon House stands east of Stoneham's Central Square, at the northwest corner of Spring and Washington Streets. The setting is residential, but Washington Street is a busy artery, and the house stands just northeast of its junction with Pleasant Street, another artery. It is a two-story eight-sided structure, covered by a low-pitch hip roof with a central octagonal cupola. The walls are finished in wooden clapboards, and the house rests on a granite foundation. The roof has extended eaves studded with decorative brackets. The entry, set in the south-facing front facade, is sheltered by an open porch with decorative square posts and brackets, and there is a two-story addition projecting from the rear side of the house. The other faces of the build have sash windows set in simple molded frames on each floor.

The house was built in 1850 by the Worcester Bros. firm for William Bryant, Jr., a shoecutter, and Lucinda A. (Hook) Bryant, his wife. It is one of three octagon houses built in Stoneham during the 1850s, and is the best preserved. Octagon houses were promoted by Orson Squire Fowler, and were an architectural fad during the 1850s.

== See also ==
- List of octagon houses
- National Register of Historic Places listings in Stoneham, Massachusetts
- National Register of Historic Places listings in Middlesex County, Massachusetts
