= George Cowdrey House =

Historic house in Massachusetts, United States

- U.S. National Register of Historic Places
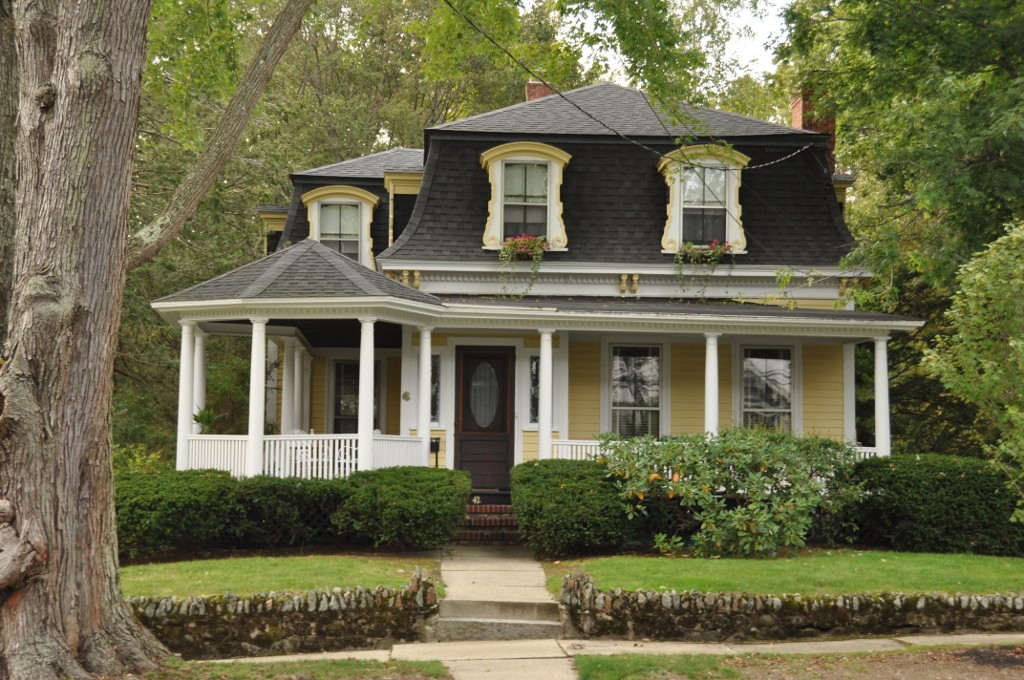

- Location within Massachusetts Location within the United States
- Location: 42 High St., Stoneham, Massachusetts
- Coordinates: 42°29′26″N 71°5′45″W
- Built: 1865
- Architectural style: Second Empire
- MPS: Stoneham MRA
- NRHP reference No.: 84002557
- Added to NRHP: April 13, 1984

The George Cowdrey House is a historic house at 42 High Street in Stoneham, Massachusetts. It was built about 1865 for George Cowdrey, a local shoe manufacturer and state legislator, and is one of the town's finest examples of residential Second Empire architecture. It was listed on the National Register of Historic Places in 1984.

== Description and history ==
The George Cowdrey House stands near the crest of a hill northeast of Stoneham's Central Square, on the west side of High Street north of its junction with Cowdrey Street (which is also named for George Cowdrey). It is a modest two-story building, set on a large lot with a low stone retaining wall at the sidewalk. The house is covered with a mansard roof and has a clapboarded exterior. A porch wraps around to the left side, with a gazebo section at the corner. The porch is supported by round Tuscan columns and has dentil moulding at the eave. The mansard roof dormers are topped by segmented arches and have scrollwork framing around their windows. Stylistically sympathetic ells extend to the side and rear of the main block, which exhibits high quality craftsmanship both outside and inside.

The house was built about 1865, and is one a few well preserved Second Empire residence in Stoneham. It was built for George Cowdrey, a Stoneham native, shoe manufacturer, and state legislator. The most significant alterations to the house after its construction are the porch and gazebo (added about 1900), and the leaded sidelights flanking the front entrance.

== See also ==
- National Register of Historic Places listings in Stoneham, Massachusetts
- National Register of Historic Places listings in Middlesex County, Massachusetts
