= Stoneham station =

Former railway station in Stoneham, Massachusetts

Stoneham
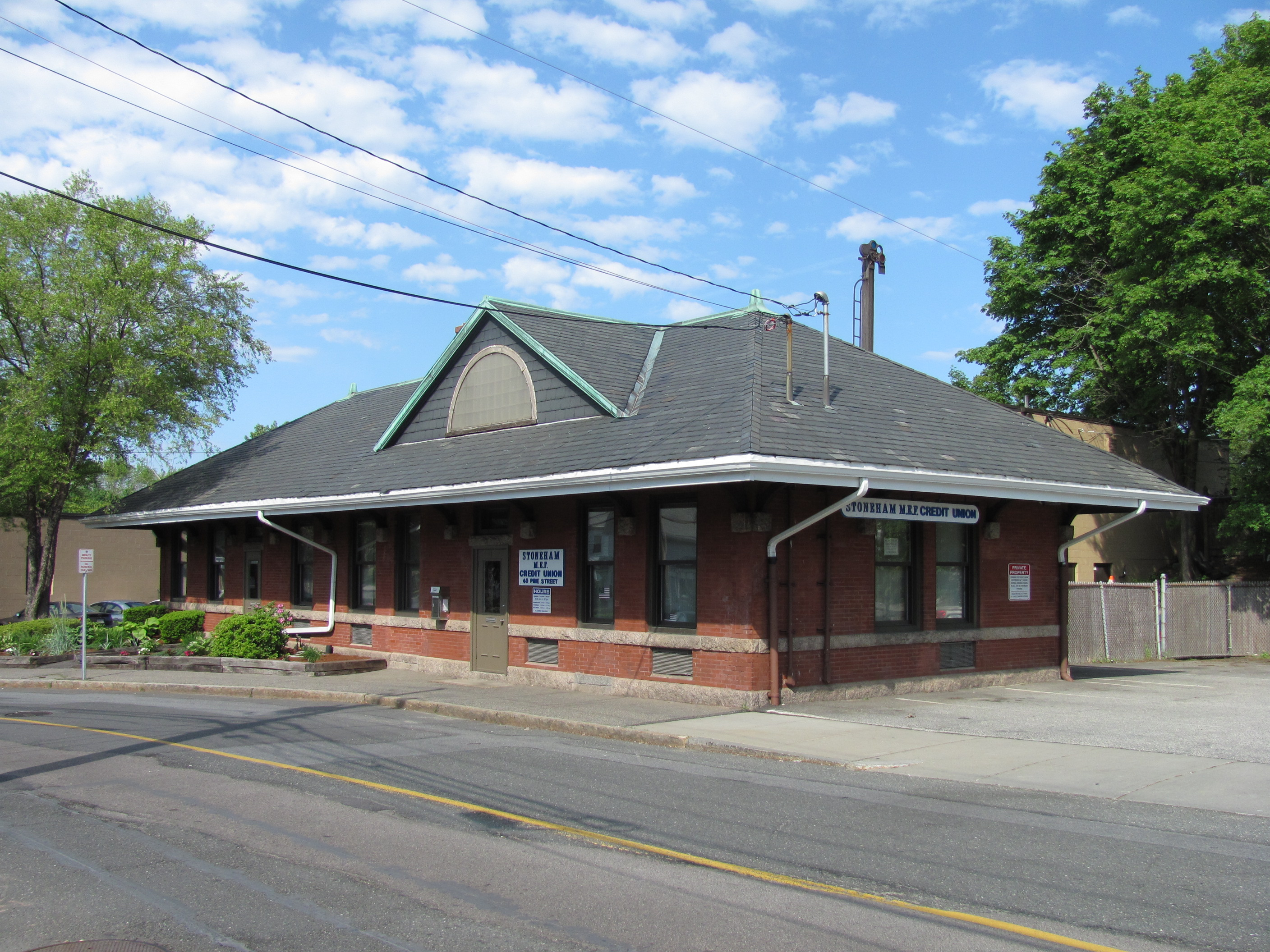
- The former Stoneham station in June 2011

General information
- Location: 36 Pine Street, Stoneham, Massachusetts
- Line: Stoneham Branch

History
- Opened: 1862
- Closed: May 18, 1958
- Rebuilt: 1895
- Boston and Maine Railroad Depot
- U.S. National Register of Historic Places
- Location within Massachusetts Location within the United States
- Coordinates: 42°28′42″N 71°5′50″W
- Built: 1895
- MPS: Stoneham MRA
- NRHP reference No.: 84002510
- Added to NRHP: April 13, 1984
Location

Stoneham station is a former train station in Stoneham, Massachusetts. Built in 1895 by the Boston and Maine Railroad, it is one of two surviving train stations in the town, and the only one still at its original site. The building was listed on the National Register of Historic Places in 1984 as Boston and Maine Railroad Depot. It is now used for commercial purposes.

== Description and history ==
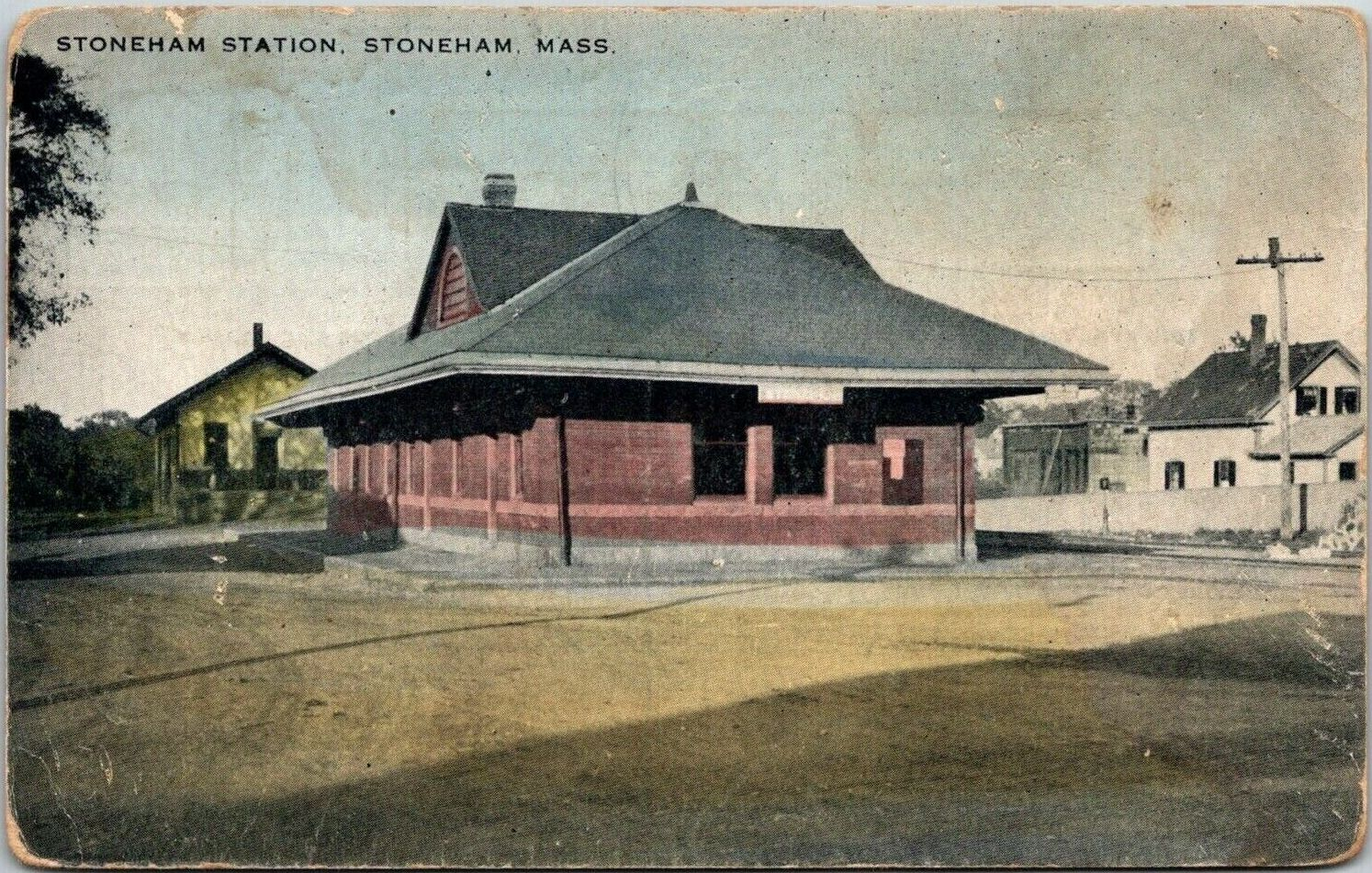
Circa-1910 postcard of the station

The railroad depot is located two blocks east of its Central Square, at the northeast corner of Franklin and Pine Streets. It is a single-story brick building resting on a granite foundation, with a shallow-hipped roof whose extended eaves are supported by large brackets. The roof is pierced by cross gables which have fanlight windows that have been blocked up. It is oriented with its long facade facing Pine Street, with the former railroad right-of-way on the other side (now used for parking on this parcel, and not readily evident in adjacent parcels).

Stoneham's first railroad station was built at Farm Hill in 1861, and a wood-frame gambrel-roofed station was built on this site in 1863; both of these were built by the Boston and Lowell Railroad. The present station building was constructed in 1895 by the Boston and Maine, successor to the Boston and Lowell. It was estimated to cost $28,000 (equivalent to $910,000 in 2024). The Farm Hill station building still stands, but has been moved from its site to Central Street and converted into a residence. The railroad played an important role in Stoneham's transition from a modest industrial center to a commuter suburb of Boston.

== See also ==
- National Register of Historic Places listings in Stoneham, Massachusetts
- National Register of Historic Places listings in Middlesex County, Massachusetts
