= Cowdrey Cricket Club =

Cricket club in Tonbridge, Kent, England

- Twenty20 name: Cowdrey Cannons
- League: Kent League Division III

Personnel
- 1st XI captain: Stuart Clarke
- 2nd XI captain: Rob Fenwick
- Coach: Gary Marshall

Team information
- City: Tonbridge
- Colours: Red & white
- Founded: 1948
- Home ground: Swanmead Sports Ground
- Official website: https://cowdrey.cricket.club/

Cowdrey Cricket Club (CCC) (formerly Tonbridge Printers) is a cricket club based in Tonbridge, Kent, England. Cowdrey is an ECB Clubmark and Focus club.

Cowdrey CC's Saturday 1st and 2nd XIs currently compete in Division 3 of their respective Kent Leagues.

Thanks largely to Director of Coaching Gary Marshall, Cowdrey CC provides coaching and cricket for a large colts section. Up to one hundred youngsters train every week night during the summer, and the club's selection policy emphasises promoting youngsters wherever possible. A large number of first- and second-team cricketers today started out as junior members of the club.

== History ==
Tonbridge Printers Cricket Club was founded in 1948, to provide cricket for the working men of Tonbridge. The club trained and played at the Racecourse Sportsground, now Tonbridge Park. At the club's 50-year anniversary in 1998, the committee elected for a name change. It was decided that the club should honour Colin Cowdrey, Baron of Tonbridge, one of the finest batsmen ever to play for Kent and England. Today, Cowdrey CC plays competitive cricket in Division III of the Kent League (both 1st and 2nd XIs), fielding up to three sides on a Saturday and one on a Sunday.
