= Lake Cowdrey =

Lake in the state of Minnesota, United States

- Lake Cowdry, Cowdry Lake
- Location within Minnesota
- Location: Douglas County, Minnesota
- Coordinates: 45°54′N 95°25′W
- Type: lake
- Surface area: 242.55 acres (98.16 ha)
- Average depth: 25 feet (7.6 m)
- Max. depth: 52 feet (16 m)
- Shore length^{1}: 3.05 miles (4.91 km)
- References: https://www.dnr.state.mn.us/lakefind/lake.html?id=21010300
- ^{1} Shore length is not a well-defined measure.

Lake Cowdrey, also known as Lake Cowdry and Cowdry Lake, is a lake in Douglas County, in the U.S. state of Minnesota. The lakes fish population includes black bullhead, black crappie, bluegill, bowfin (dogfish),brown bullhead, common carp, green sunfish, hybrid sunfish, largemouth bass, northern pike, pumpkinseed, rock bass, shorthead redhorse, smallmouth bass, tullibee (cisco), walleye, white sucker, yellow bullhead, and yellow perch.

The lake was named for Samuel Burritt Cowdrey, a pioneer settler.

== See also ==
- List of lakes in Minnesota
