= Jenkins House =

Jenkins House may refer to:

in the United States

(by state, then city)

- Jenkins Farmhouse, Dupree, Alabama, listed on the National Register of Historic Places (NRHP) in Lee County, Alabama
- Jenkins Farm and House, Loxley, Alabama, listed on the NRHP in Baldwin County, Alabama
- Jenkins House (West Palm Beach, Florida)
- Israel Jenkins House, Marion, Indiana, listed on the NRHP in Grant County, Indiana
- Dr. George A. Jenkins House, Albia, Iowa, listed on the NRHP in Monroe County, Iowa
- Jenkins-Berkshire House, Petersburg, Kentucky, listed on the NRHP in Boone County, Kentucky
- Charles W. Jenkins House, Bangor, Maine, listed on the NRHP in Penobscot County, Maine
- Benjamin Jenkins House, Andover, Massachusetts, listed on the NRHP in Massachusetts
- John Jenkins Homestead, Barnstable, Massachusetts, listed on the NRHP in Massachusetts
- Joseph Jenkins House, Barnstable, Massachusetts, listed on the NRHP in Massachusetts
- Jenkins-Whelden Farmstead, Barnstable, Massachusetts, listed on the NRHP in Massachusetts
- Franklin B. Jenkins House (35 Chestnut Street, Stoneham, Massachusetts), listed on the NRHP in Massachusetts
- Franklin B. Jenkins House (2 Middle Street, Stoneham, Massachusetts), listed on the NRHP in Massachusetts
- Jenkins House (Delanson, New York), listed on the NRHP in New York
- Jenkins-Perry House, Milan, Ohio, listed on the NRHP in Erie County, Ohio
- Gov. William W. Jenkins Homestead Site, Newkirk, Oklahoma, listed on the NRHP in Kay County, Oklahoma
- Belle Ainsworth Jenkins Estate, Beaverton, Oregon, listed on the NRHP in Washington County, Oregon
- Jenkins-Mead House, Morristown, New Jersey, listed on the NRHP in Morris County, New Jersey
- Jenkins Octagon House, Duanesburg, New York, listed on the NRHP in New York
- David Jenkins House, Gastonia, North Carolina, listed on the NRHP in Gaston County, North Carolina
- Jenkins Homestead, Lansdale, Pennsylvania, listed on the NRHP in Montgomery County, Pennsylvania
- Mary Jenkins Community Praise House, Frogmore, South Carolina, listed on the NRHP in Beaufort County, South Carolina
- Fowler-Jenkins House, Bastrop, Texas, listed on the NRHP in Bastrop County, Texas
- Jenkins House (Bastrop, Texas), listed on the NRHP in Texas
- Edward J. Jenkins House, Bryan, Texas, listed on the NRHP in Brazos County, Texas
- Edwin and Mary Jenkins House, Paris, Texas, listed on the NRHP in Lamar County, Texas
- Joseph J. Jenkins House, Park City, Utah, listed on the NRHP in Summit County, Utah
- Gen. Albert Gallatin Jenkins House, Green Bottom, West Virginia, listed on the NRHP in Cabell County, West Virginia
- Halbert D. Jenkins House, Whitefish Bay, Wisconsin, listed on the NRHP in Milwaukee County, Wisconsin

== See also ==
- Franklin B. Jenkins House (disambiguation)
