= Newton Lamson House =

Historic house in Massachusetts, United States

- U.S. National Register of Historic Places
- U.S. Historic district – Contributing property
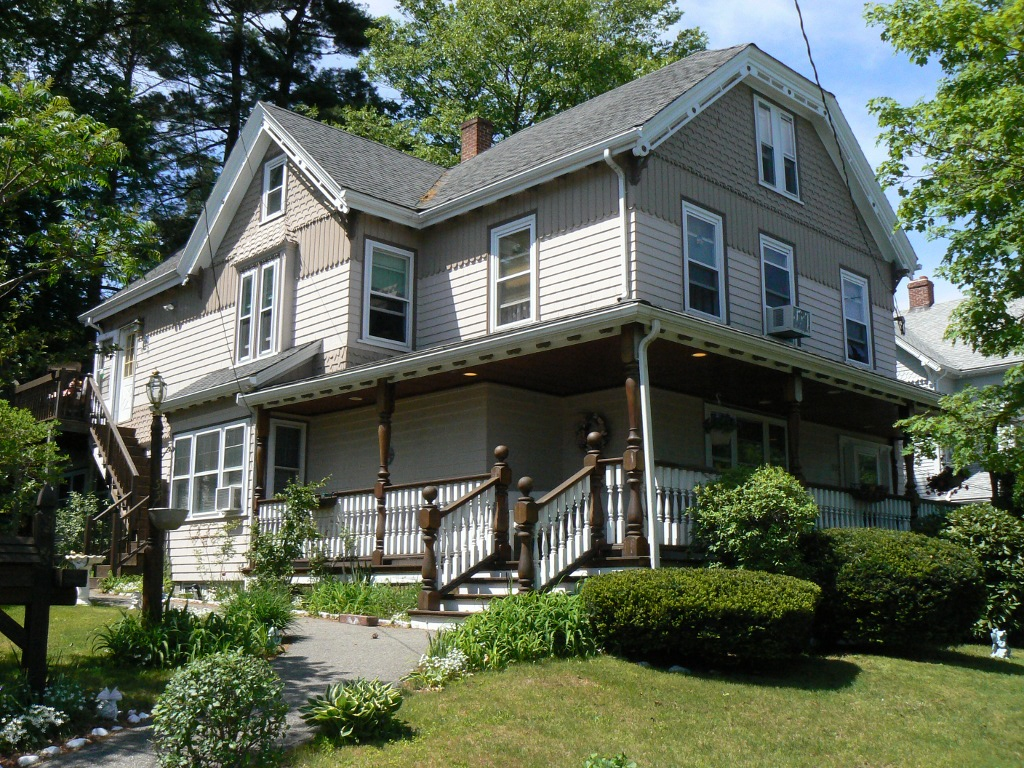

- Location within Massachusetts Location within the United States
- Location: 33 Chestnut St., Stoneham, Massachusetts
- Coordinates: 42°28′46″N 71°6′16″W
- Built: 1887
- Architectural style: Stick/Eastlake, Queen Anne
- Part of: Nobility Hill Historic District (ID89002328)
- MPS: Stoneham MRA
- NRHP reference No.: 84002727

Significant dates
- Added to NRHP: April 13, 1984
- Designated CP: February 9, 1990

The Newton Lamson House is a historic house at 33 Chestnut Street in the Nobility Hill section of Stoneham, Massachusetts. Built c. 1887, it is one of Stoneham's finest Queen Anne/Stick style houses. It has a rectangular plan, with a gable roof that has a cross gable centered on the south side. The gable ends are clad in decorative cut shingles, and the gables are decorated with Stick-style vergeboard elements. Below the eaves hangs a decorative wave-patterned valance. The porch has turned posts and balusters. It is further enhanced by its position in the center of a group of stylish period houses, including the Sidney A. Hill House and the Franklin B. Jenkins House.

The house was listed on the National Register of Historic Places in 1984, and included in the Nobility Hill Historic District in 1990.

== See also ==
- National Register of Historic Places listings in Stoneham, Massachusetts
- National Register of Historic Places listings in Middlesex County, Massachusetts
