= D. Horace Tilton House =

Historic house in Massachusetts, United States

- U.S. National Register of Historic Places
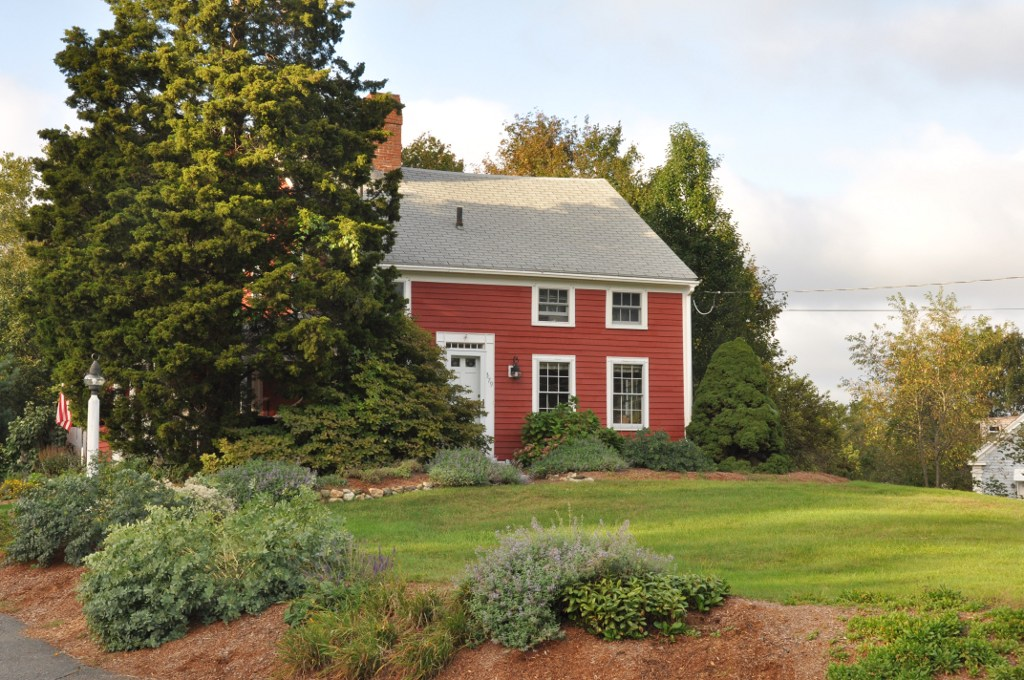

- Location within Massachusetts Location within the United States
- Location: 379 Albion St., Wakefield, Massachusetts
- Coordinates: 42°29′34″N 71°5′9″W
- Built: 1726
- Architectural style: Federal
- MPS: Wakefield MRA
- NRHP reference No.: 89000715
- Added to NRHP: July 06, 1989

The D. Horace Tilton House is a historic house at 379 Albion Street in Wakefield, Massachusetts. The 1 1/2-story wood-frame house is a well-preserved small Federal-style house built in the later years of the 18th century, when the area was part of Stoneham. Four bays wide, its front door has a later Greek Revival surround, around which time its upper-level windows may also have been added. The house belonged to D. Horace Tilton, a shoemaker.

The house was listed on the National Register of Historic Places in 1989.

== See also ==
- National Register of Historic Places listings in Wakefield, Massachusetts
- National Register of Historic Places listings in Middlesex County, Massachusetts
