= Charles Wood House =

Historic house in Massachusetts, United States

- U.S. National Register of Historic Places
- U.S. Historic district – Contributing property
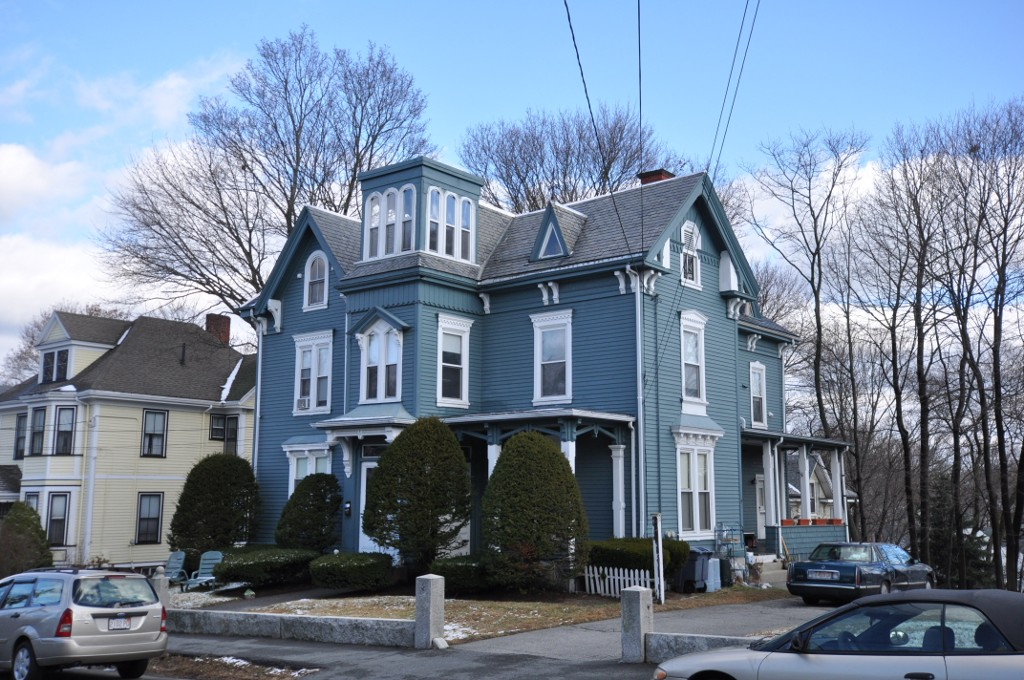

- Location within Massachusetts Location within the United States
- Location: 34 Chestnut St., Stoneham, Massachusetts
- Coordinates: 42°28′45″N 71°6′14″W
- Built: 1875
- Architectural style: Italianate, High Victorian Italianate
- Part of: Nobility Hill Historic District (ID89002328)
- MPS: Stoneham MRA
- NRHP reference No.: 84002860

Significant dates
- Added to NRHP: April 13, 1984
- Designated CP: February 9, 1990

The Charles Wood House is a historic house at 30 Chestnut Street in Stoneham, Massachusetts. It is one of the most elaborate Italianate houses in Stoneham. The 2 1/2-story wood-frame house was built c. 1875 for Charles Wood, who lived there until the first decade of the 20th century.

Its basic plan is an L shape, but there is a projecting section on the center of the main facade that includes a flat-roof third-story turret, and the roof line has numerous gables facing different directions. There are porches on the front right, and in the crook of the L, with Stick style decorations, the cornice features heavy paired brackets, some of its windows are narrow rounded windows in a somewhat Gothic Revival style, and the walls are clad in several types and shapes of wooden clapboards and shingles.

The house was listed on the National Register of Historic Places in 1984, where it is listed at 30 Chestnut Street. The property is also a contributing resource to the Nobility Hill Historic District, listed in 1990.

== See also ==
- National Register of Historic Places listings in Stoneham, Massachusetts
- National Register of Historic Places listings in Middlesex County, Massachusetts
