= Franklin Park Zoo =

Zoo in Boston, Massachusetts

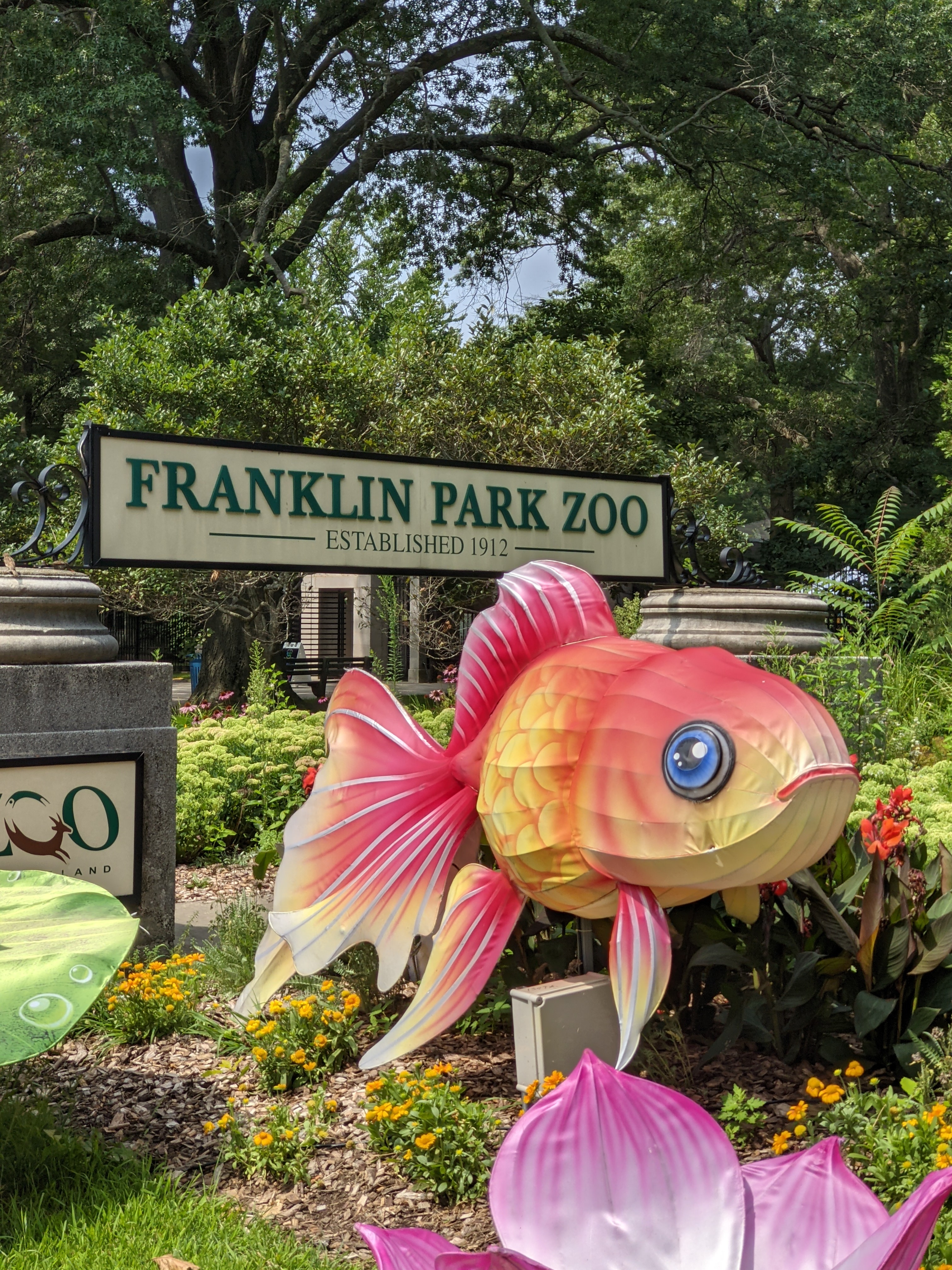
- Zoo entrance
- Interactive map of Franklin Park Zoo
- 42.3052°N 71.0891°W
- Date opened: October 4, 1912
- Location: Boston, Massachusetts, United States
- Land area: 72 acres (29 ha)
- No. of animals: 1,000+
- No. of species: 220
- Memberships: AZA
- Major exhibits: There are 63 exhibits total and major exhibits include Nature's Neighborhoods, Farmyard, Outback Trail, Bird's World, Serengeti Crossing, Giraffe Savanna, Tropical Forest, Kalahari Kingdom
- Website: www.zoonewengland.org/franklin-park-zoo

The Franklin Park Zoo is a 72-acre (290,000 m^{2}) zoo located in Boston, Massachusetts. It is currently operated by Zoo New England, which also operates the Stone Zoo in Stoneham, Massachusetts. The zoo is located in the northeast portion of Franklin Park, Boston's largest park and the last component of the city's famed Emerald Necklace.

The zoo was opened to the public in 1912, and managed by the City of Boston until 1958, when the Metropolitan District Commission (MDC) began management. Under the MDC's control, the zoo opened several new exhibits, including Bird's World (c. 1975), the Children's Zoo (1984), and the African Tropical Forest (1989). In 1991, the zoo's management was handed over to the Commonwealth Zoological Corporation (CZS), which also gained management of the Stone Zoo. In July 1997, the CZS was renamed Zoo New England to "reflect the changing image of both zoos". The zoo has been accredited by the Association of Zoos and Aquariums (AZA) since 1990.

== History ==
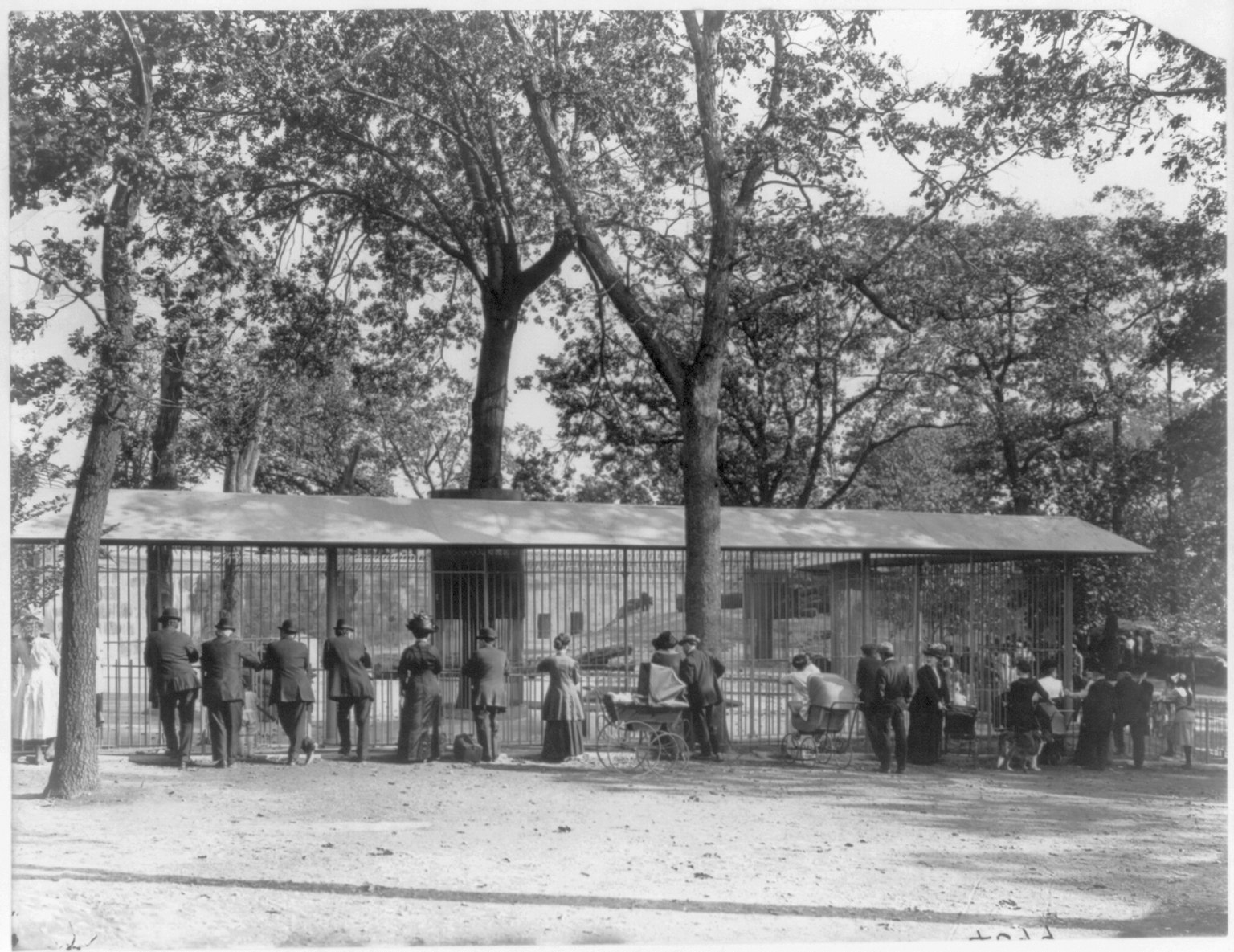
Visitors looking at the bear exhibit, 1914.

Frederick Law Olmsted, the original landscape designer of Franklin Park, created plans for a future zoological garden. This plan, however, was to be a naturalistic area for native animals, rather than a traditional zoo. The Franklin Park Zoo officially opened to the public on October 4, 1912. According to plans by Arthur A. Shurtleff, the new zoo represented a major departure from Olmsted's original plans, and included more exotic animals.

However, Shurtleff's design for the zoo was modest and was intended to be in harmony with key elements of the plan, such as a half-mile long grassy mall called "the Greeting", which began at Peabody Circle. The zoo was managed by the Boston Parks Department, was free to all, and extremely popular. An estimated two-million people visited the zoo in 1920.

The zoo fell into disrepair starting around the time of the Depression and through World War II. In 1958, the Metropolitan District Commission (MDC) took control of the Franklin Park Zoo. The MDC put up fences and gates and started charging admission to the zoo, and areas of the zoo that were difficult to take care of, such as the elephant house and the Bear Dens in Long Crouch Woods, were separated from the zoo property and left to deteriorate. Soon afterward, the zoo received its first professionally trained zoologist to serve as its director, Walter D. Stone. An animal hospital, administrative buildings, and the Children's Zoo (opened in 1962) were also added. In 1970, the Boston Zoological Society assumed some, but not all, management of the zoo, while the state continued to provide funding for the facility.

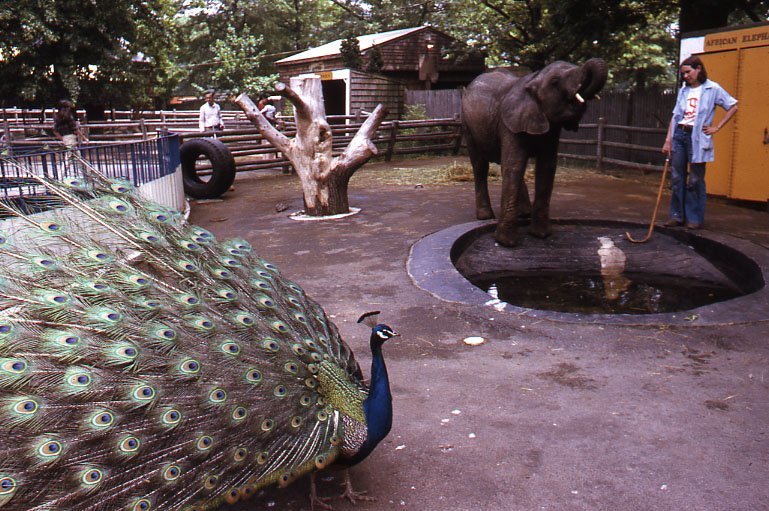
Peacock and elephant with a zookeeper, 1975.

In 1973, a new $24 million master plan, which would "recommend replacing 'the Greeting' with new zoo exhibits", was formulated to revitalize and expand the facility, and included several new domed pavilions, stressing an African theme. Construction began in 1978, but the process was prolonged due to inadequate funding and political complications.

On July 1, 1984, after extensive renovations, the 3-acre (1.2 ha) Children's Zoo was reopened; around this time it became the zoo's most popular exhibit. After eleven years of construction at a cost of $26 million, the new African Tropical Forest Pavilion opened on September 9, 1989. The zoo was finally accredited by the American Association of Zoological Parks and Aquariums (AAZPA) in 1990. At the time, it was the only zoo in the nation to be run by a state government (besides the Stone Zoo). After accreditation, the zoo's attendance jumped to 200,000. The number of visitors, however, would continue to fluctuate over the next few years.

In 1991, Franklin Park Zoo's management was handed over to the Commonwealth Zoological Corporation (renamed Zoo New England in July 1997). This private, non-profit corporation also took over management of the Stone Zoo, which would reopen in June 1992 after being closed for 18 months due to state budget cuts. In the late 1990s, many new exhibits were built, including Bongo Congo (1997), Outback Trail (1998), and Butterfly Landing (1998). Also at this time, the zoo faced many problems, including multiple budget cuts and dwindling attendance. The zoo is now doing well financially and continues to grow, due to the kindness of many supporters.

The 2011 movie Zookeeper, starring Kevin James, was filmed at the zoo in 2009.

== Exhibits ==
The zoo contains more than 220 species of animals and includes the following main exhibit areas.

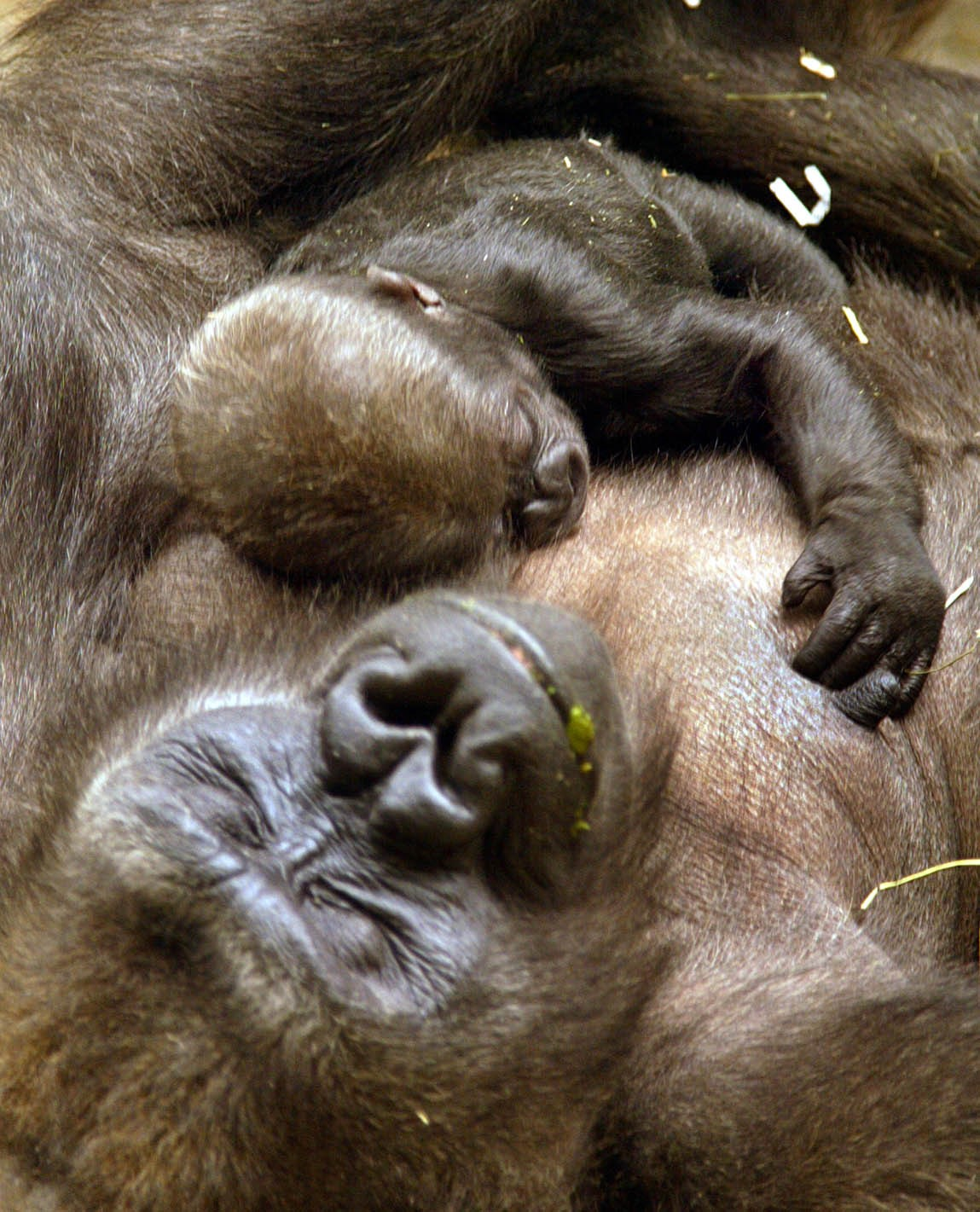
Kimani, daughter of Kiki and Kit, was the second western lowland gorilla born at the zoo.

The Tropical Forest (known as the African Tropical Forest from 1989 to 1997), a 3-acre (1.2 ha) building roofed by a huge Teflon-coated cloth dome. The building mimics the animals' natural environment with streams, moats, faux-rock structures, hidden fences and barriers. The exhibit includes African painted dogs, Baird's tapirs, ball python, cotton-top tamarins, De Brazza's monkeys, dwarf crocodiles, fruit bats, giant anteaters, green anacondas, Kenyan sand boa, Linne's two-toed sloths, pygmy hippos, ring-tailed lemurs, West African pottos, western lowland gorillas, saddle-billed storks, emperor scorpions, various birds, fish, and insects. As of 2025, a male clouded leopard currently resides in the former ocelot enclosure.

This exhibit was included in the zoo's 1973 master plan, and was originally home exclusively to African rainforest animals; however, more Central and South American species began being displayed in the Tropical Forest by the late 1990s. One gorilla named Little Joe escaped his enclosure several times in 2003. He was later separated from the gorilla family, but later returned in 2007. Also in 2007, the zoo's gorilla exhibit was reopened after extensive renovations. As of 2011, a male giant anteater named Jockamo resides in the former warthog enclosure. In spring 2020, a wildlife trade exhibit showcasing artifacts will be displayed in the tropical forest public areas.

Serengeti Crossing (known as Bongo Congo from 1997 to c. 2003): A 4-acre (1.6 ha) grasslands exhibit with common ostriches, Hartmann's mountain zebras, and white-bearded wildebeest. The exhibit first opened in 1997, making it one of the first new exhibits to open at the zoo since the opening of the African Tropical Forest in 1989. Reconfigured to 1.25 acres in 2018, adding a new path and entry garden. The observation decks that once overlooked this exhibit have been collected. The area also has wattled cranes.

Video of a lion at the zoo.

Kalahari Kingdom: A large African themed area housing one African lion. The exhibit previously featured two lion brothers, until one of them (Kamaia) died in 2023. Visitors can view the remaining lion through a replica of a land rover "crashed" into the exhibit, glass, or from over a moat. The opening of this exhibit in 1997 marked the first time lions had been exhibited at the zoo since the old Lion House was closed in the early 1970s. Other animals included are African spurred tortoises, bactrian camels, kori bustards, lowland nyalas, red river hogs, and spotted hyenas.

Outback Trail: Australian animals such as emus, laughing kookaburras, North Island brown kiwis, red-necked wallabies, tawny frogmouths, and western gray kangaroos. This exhibit opened around 1998, the same year the Butterfly Landing exhibit first opened. A seasonal budgerigar aviary offers opportunities to feed them.

Giraffe Savannah: Opened in 1999, this large habitat contains a herd of Masai giraffes and Somali wild ass.

Bird's World: A large building dating back to the zoo's 1912 opening containing dozens of bird species in four different environments: swamp, rainforest, desert, and wetlands. Outside, there is a large flight cage for Andean condors and Steller's sea eagles, and other birds from around the world including Bali mynahs, black crakes, blue tongued skinks, boat-billed herons, Bourke's Parrots, Gouldian finches, green aracaris, hadada ibises, greater roadrunners, Indian blue peafowls, keas, red-crested turacos, sunbitterns, violet turacos, White-naped cranes, and various waterfowl, turtles, fish and insects. A three-year-old male Steller's Sea Eagle named O-washi debuted in May 2018. This building originally opened in 1912 (the same year the zoo itself opened to the public) and was renovated around the mid-1970s to exhibit birds in more naturalistic environments.

Butterfly Landing: a seasonal exhibit containing over 1,000 butterflies in free flight. This large outdoor "tent" also has streams and a waterfall surrounded by numerous plant species. The exhibit first opened in 1997.

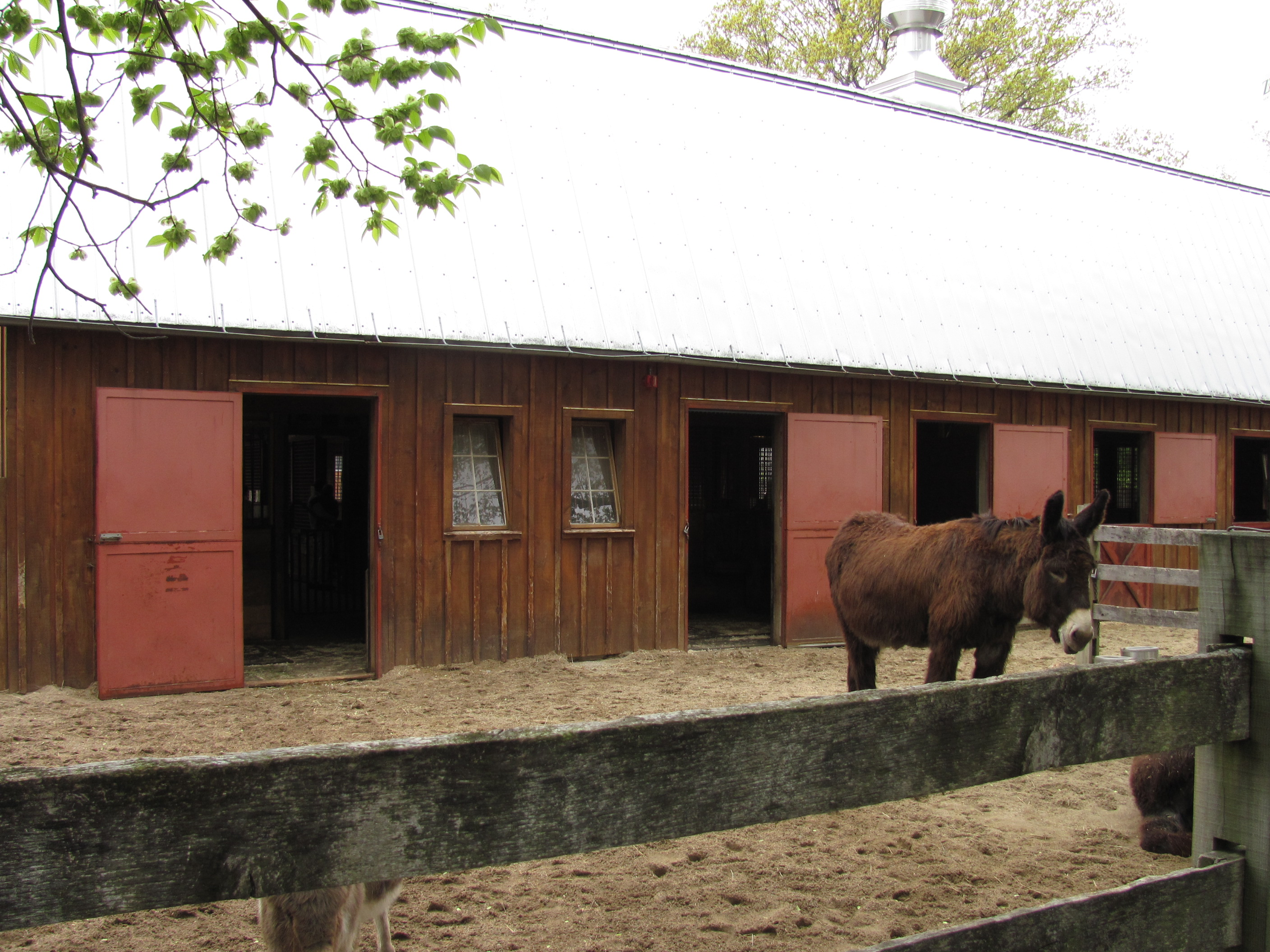
Franklin Farm at the Children's Zoo.

Children's Zoo: A three-acre complex which includes a new, walk-through aviary with assorted Asian birds, Baikal teals, golden pheasants, hooded cranes, black-tailed prairie dogs, red pandas, Reeve's muntjacs, and turtles. There is also the Franklin Farm, a barn with paddocks for livestock and an interaction area for goats with various outbuildings. The animals include Black Welsh Mountain sheep, Dexter cattles, Guinea hogs, Morgan horses, Nigerian dwarf goats, Poitou donkeys, heritage breeds of chickens and barn owls.

Gorilla Grove: This dynamic outdoor habitat features over 360,000 cubic feet for the troop to explore, including vines and trees for climbing, a cascading waterfall, and a multitude of built-in foraging opportunities for gorillas to discover throughout the day. Gorilla Grove opened in 2022.

African Experience: This exhibit will renovate the Serengeti Crossing exhibit, adding African Penguins and giving a new habitat to their Hartmann's Mountain Zebras, Common Ostriches, and White-bearded Wildebeest. The Penguin's habitat will feature an underwater viewing area along with a replica of a penguin rescue boat to educate visitors about the challenges these birds face in the wild. The new Savannah will feature a watering hole and new moats to give guests a better view of the animals. This project is set to open in the Spring/Summer of 2026.

The park also features a large playground for children up to the age of 12 that was created by using drawings from young kids. The different components of the playground, such as the slides, are themed after various species of animals and reptiles.

== Gallery ==
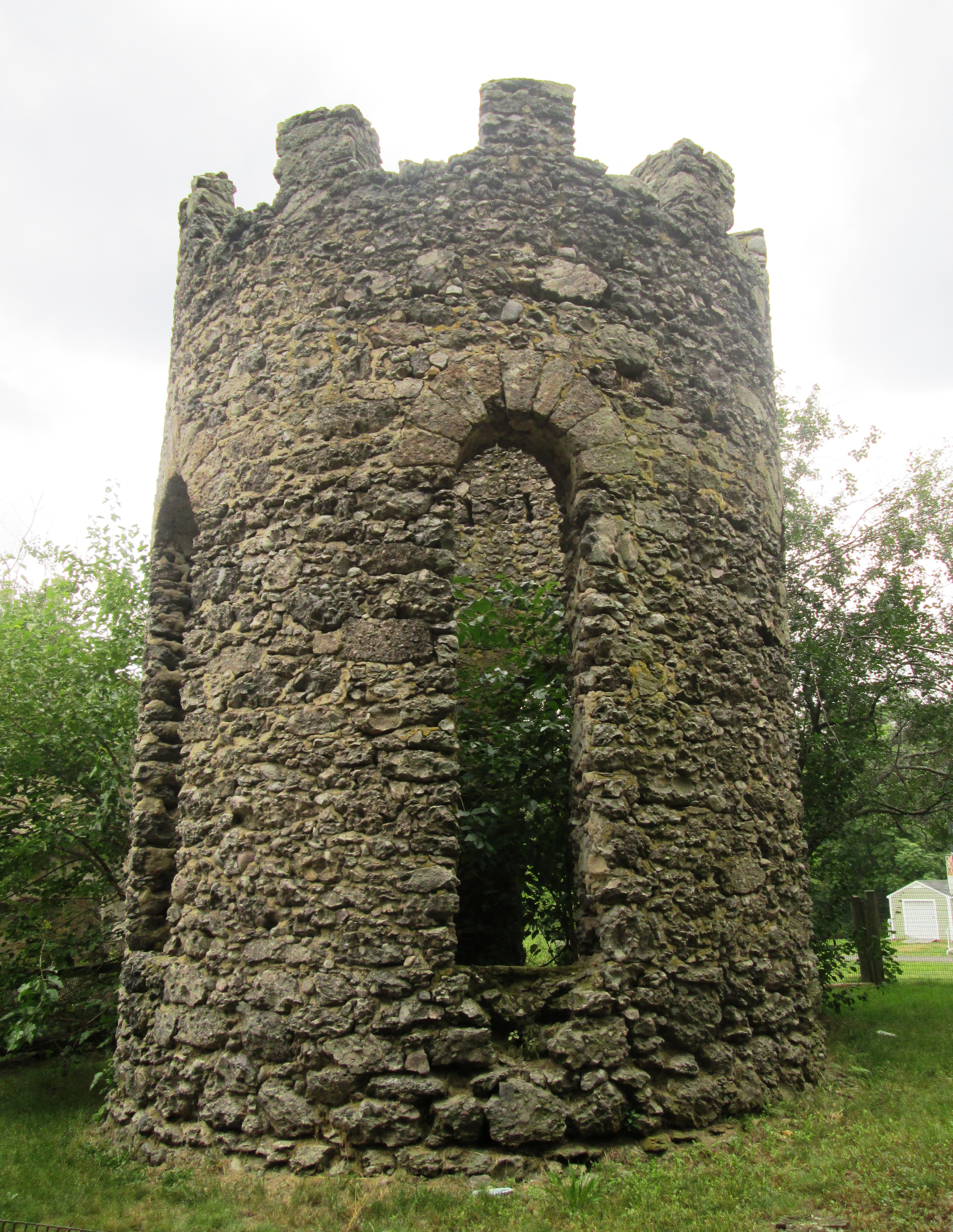
A folly onsite which predates the zoo.

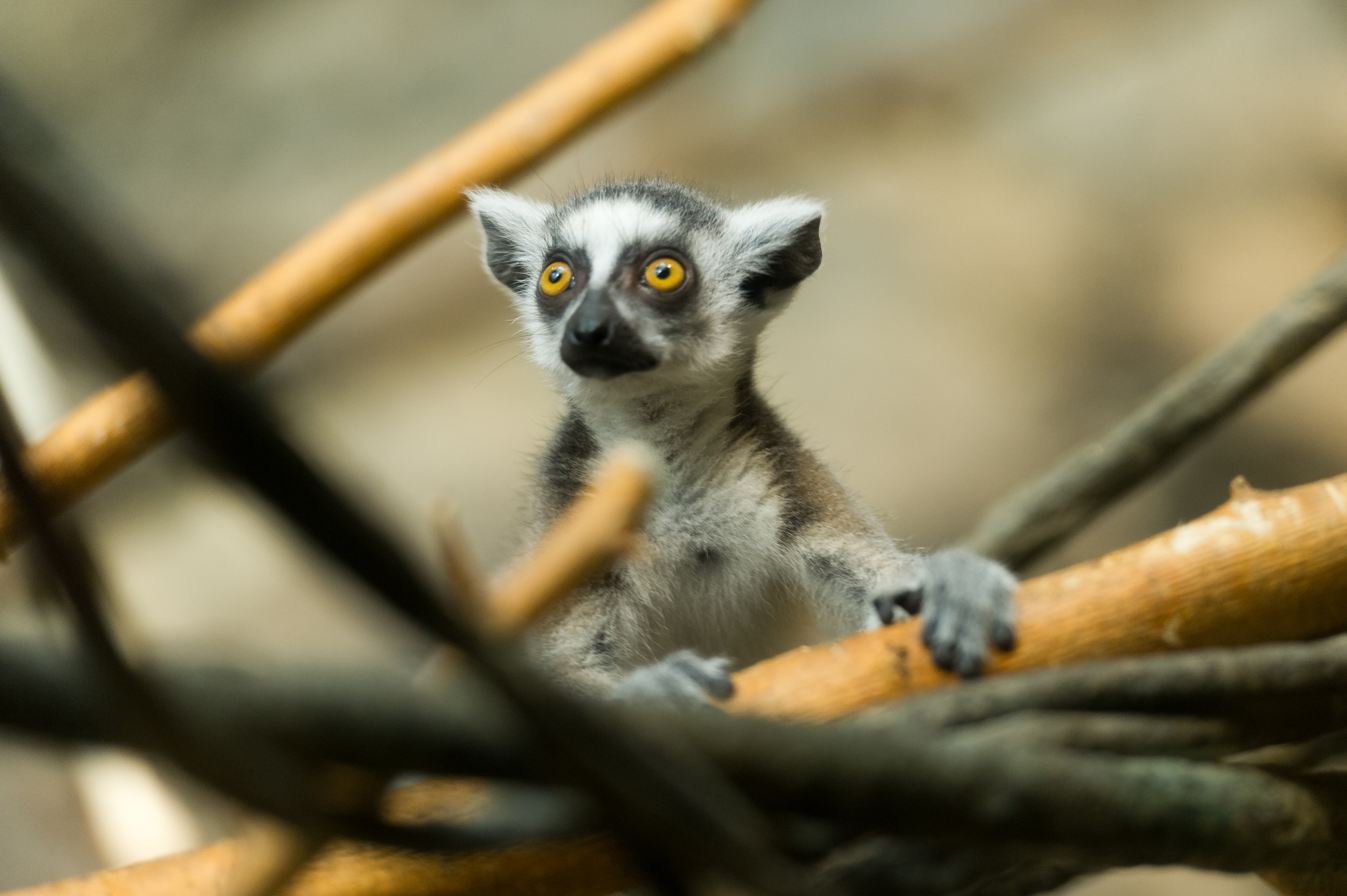
Baby lemur.

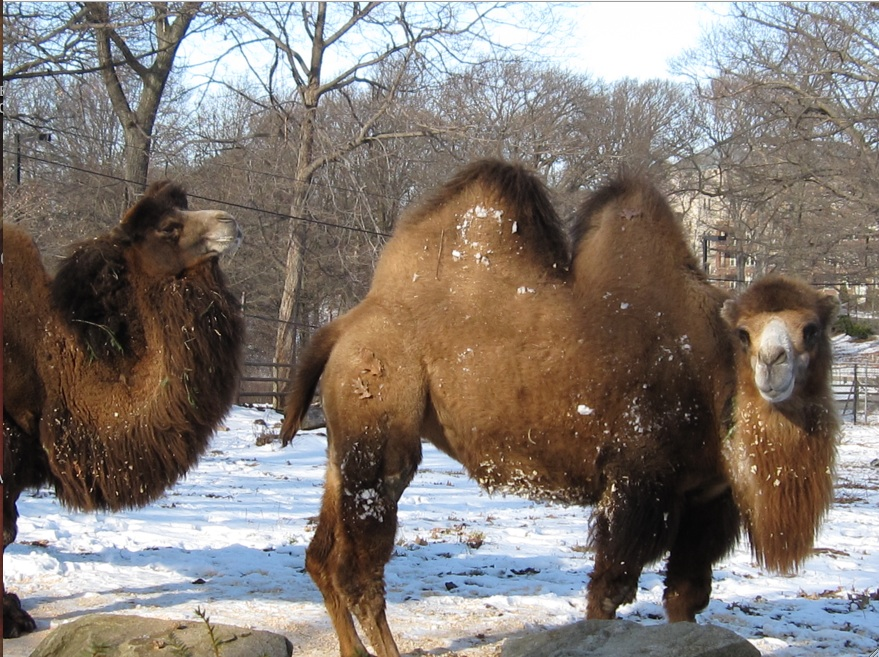
Camels

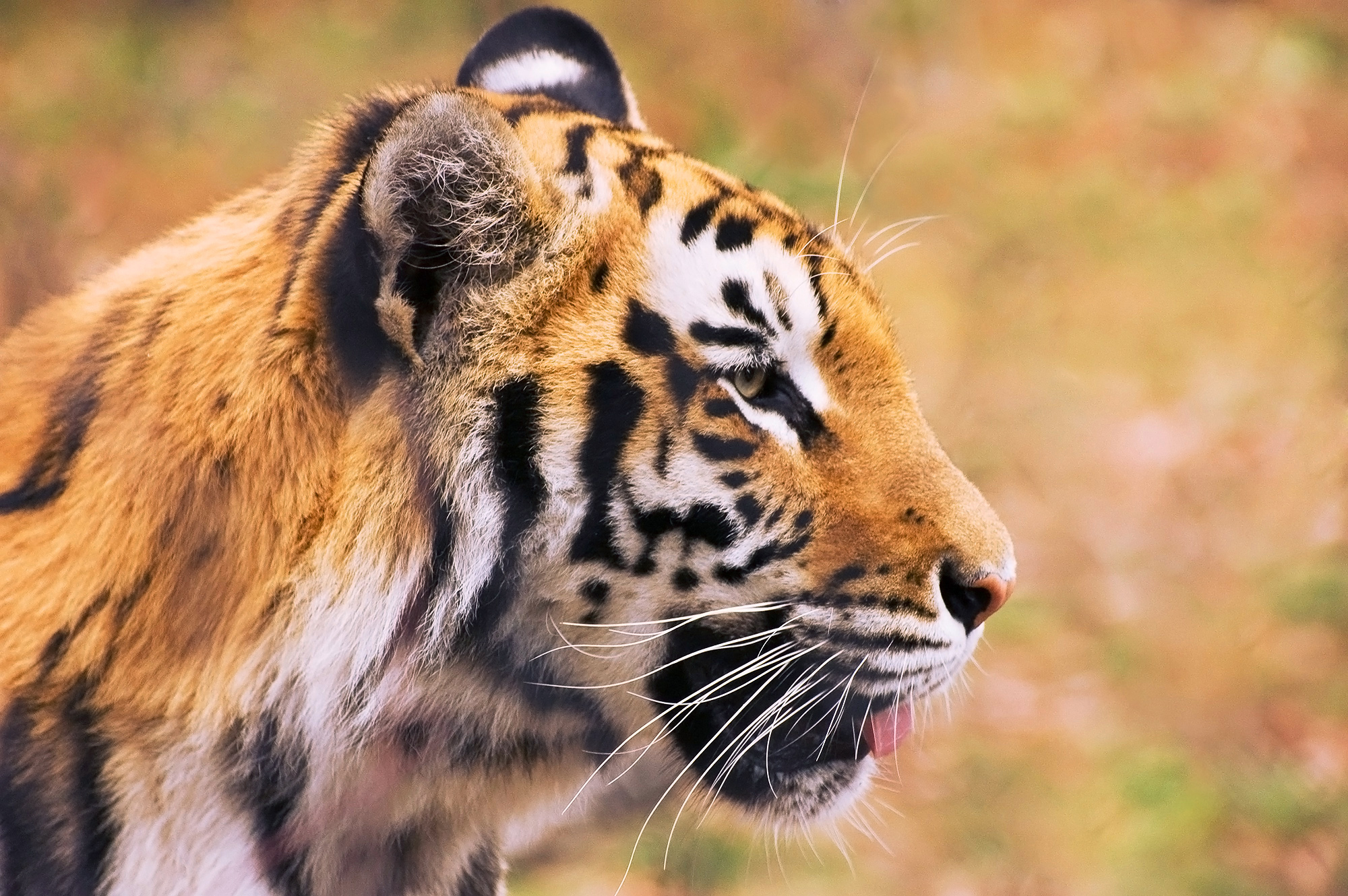
Tiger.

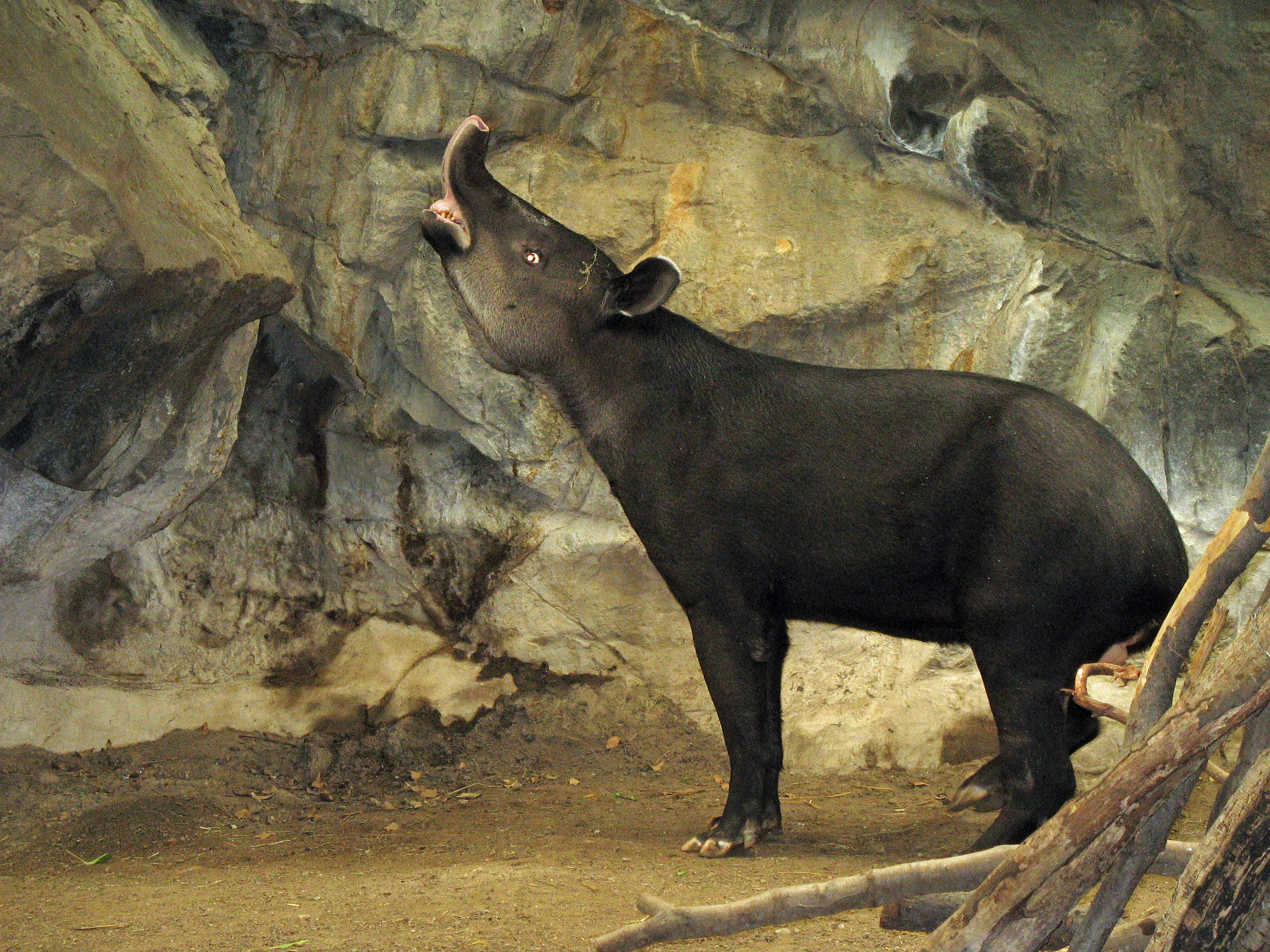
Tapir.

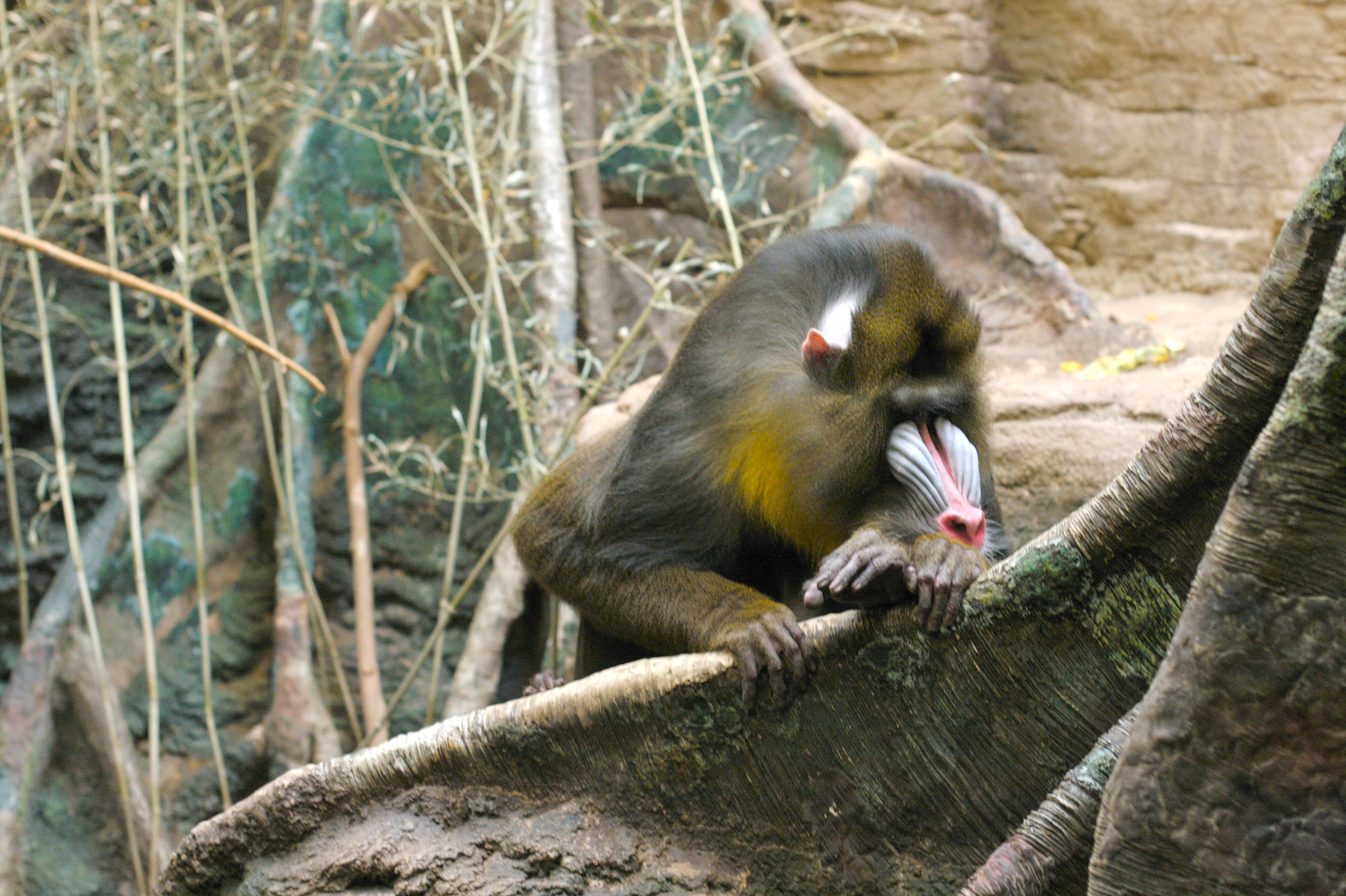
Mandrill (Mandrillus sphinx).

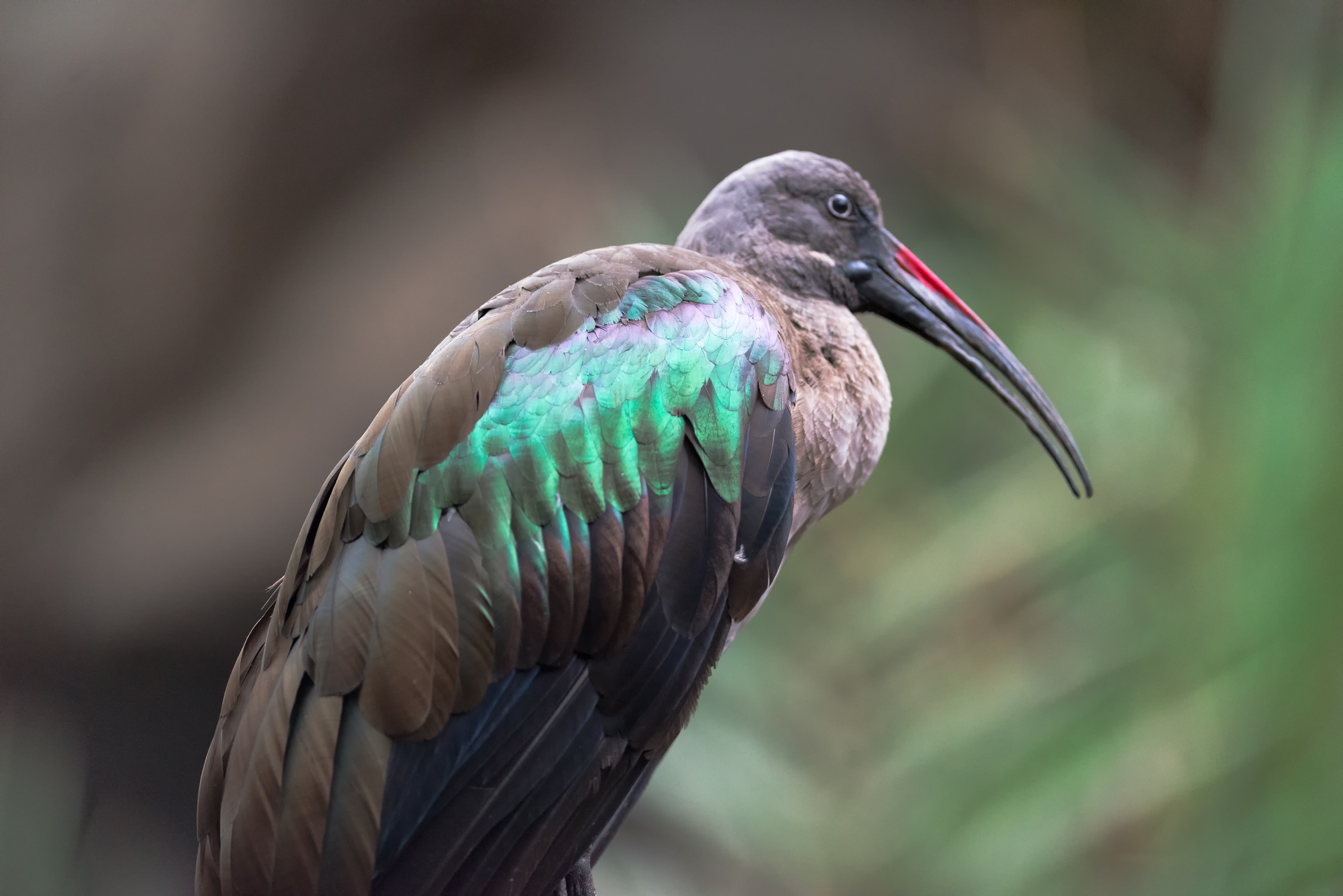
Hadada ibis (Bostrychia hagedash).

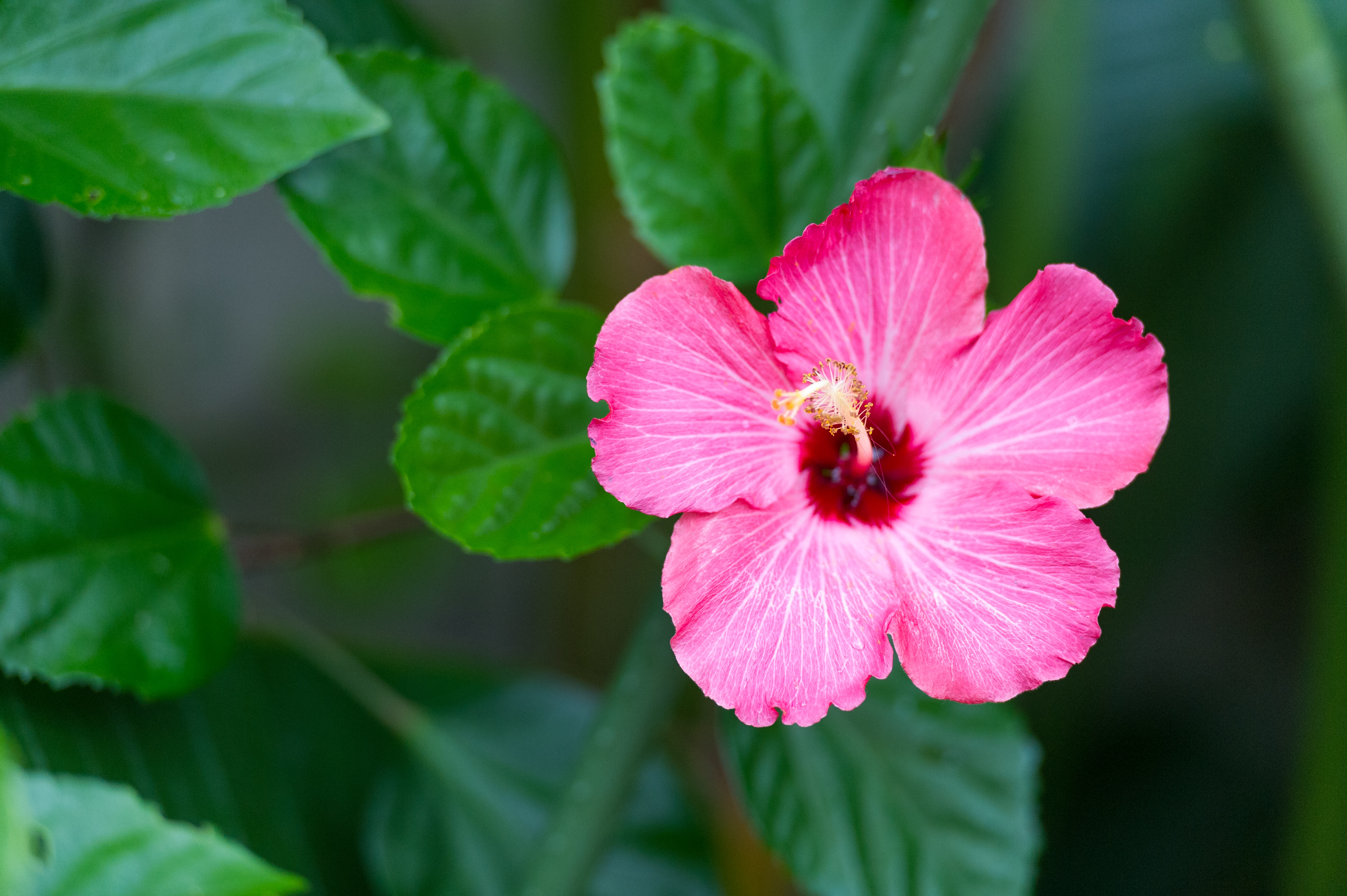
One of the many flowering plants at the zoo.

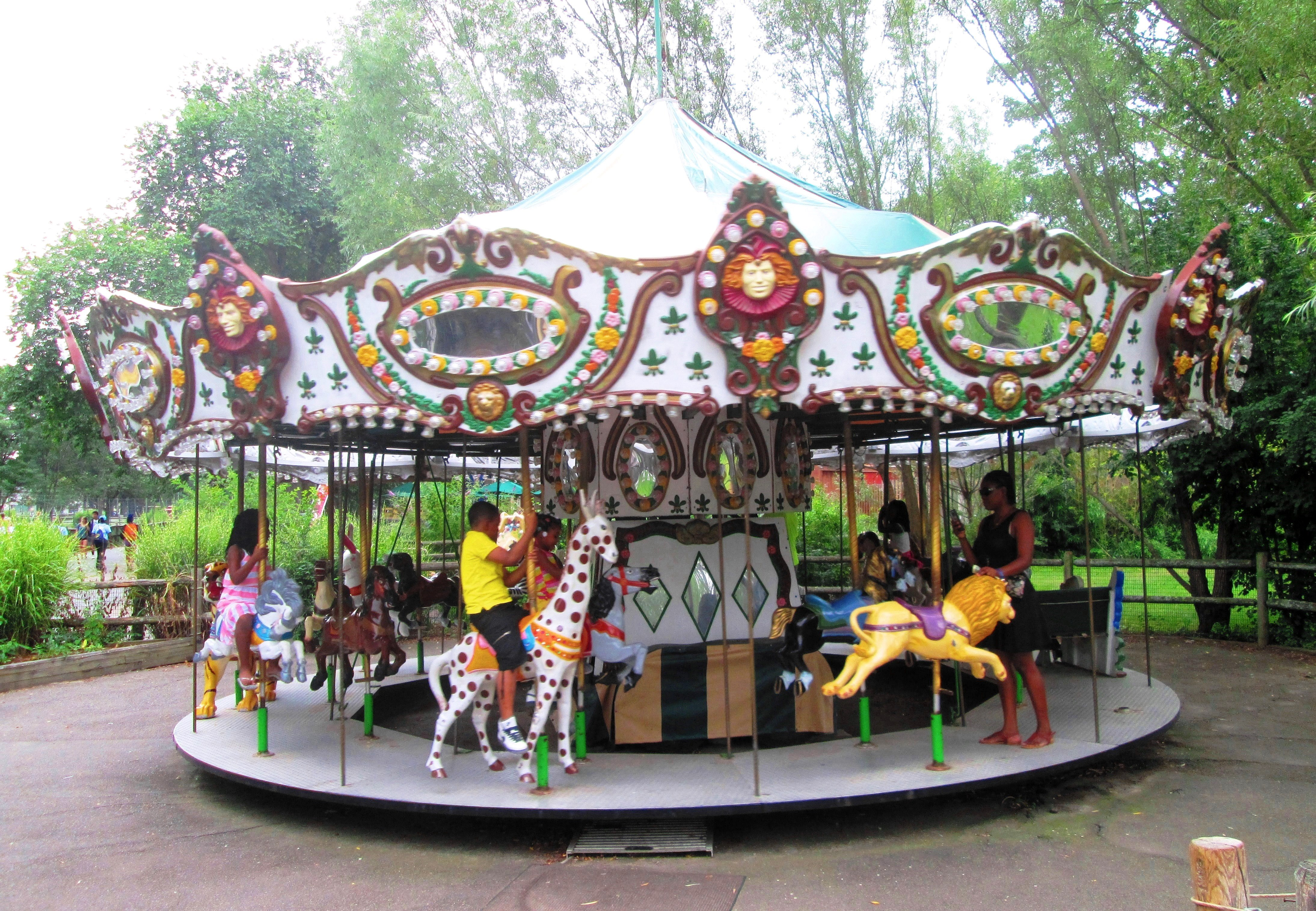
Carousel at the zoo.
