= Spot Pond =

- Location within Greater Boston area Location within Massachusetts Location within the United States
- Location: Middlesex County, Massachusetts
- Coordinates: 42.4557590°N 71.0967287°W
- Type: lake

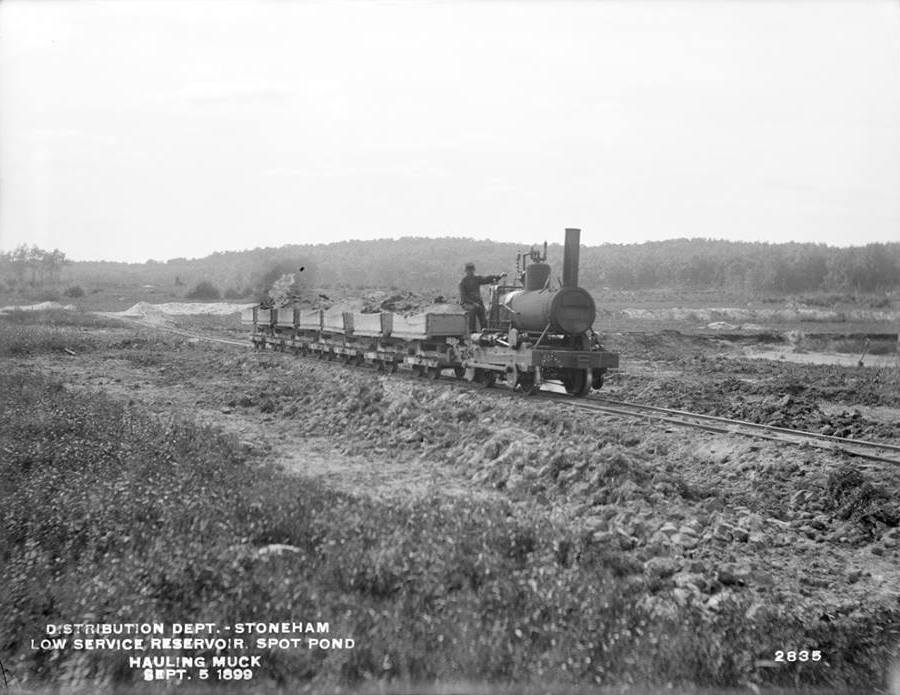
Hauling muck during construction, 5 Sept 1899

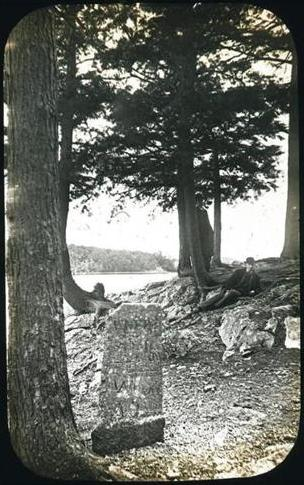
The Shute marker 'Where Shute Fell' on Great Island

Spot Pond is a lake in Middlesex County, in the U.S. state of Massachusetts. The pond is within the Middlesex Fells Reservation, a Massachusetts state park. It is almost entirely located within the boundaries of Stoneham, Massachusetts.

Spot Pond was named in 1632 by colonial governor John Winthrop.

The pond contains Great Island (42.45222°N 71.09616°W), a lake island. Great Island is known to contain an old granite marker with the mysterious inscription "Where Shute Fell". It is unknown who installed the marker, and for what reason. Possibly, it is related to a Wrestler from Haywardsville, as many wrestling matches and prizefights were held on the island.

Spot Pond lends its name to the Spot Pond Archeological District, the site of the former Hayward Rubber Works and an extinct mill town.

Under the Metropolitan Water Supply Commission (1926-1946), Spot Pond was integrated into the Boston area public drinking water supply. Its water level was raised 16 feet, and the stream running into it was diverted, making its sole supply the new East and West Spot Pond Supply mains. Spot Pond water served the northern Low Service zone, and water pumped from Spot Pond to Fells Reservoir served the Northern High Service zone. Spot Pond is no longer part of the public drinking water supply, but the Massachusetts Water Resources Authority is building covered storage tanks in the area.
