= Middlesex Fells =

Middlesex Fells may refer to:

- Middlesex Fells Reservation, in Middlesex County, Massachusetts, United States
- Middlesex Fells Zoo, former name of the Stone Zoo in Stoneham, Massachusetts
