= Franklin B. Jenkins House =

Franklin B. Jenkins House may refer to:

- Franklin B. Jenkins House (35 Chestnut Street, Stoneham, Massachusetts), listed on the NRHP in Massachusetts
- Franklin B. Jenkins House (2 Middle Street, Stoneham, Massachusetts), listed on the NRHP in Massachusetts
