= Lorenzo D. Hawkins House =

Historic house in Massachusetts, United States

- U.S. National Register of Historic Places
- U.S. Historic district – Contributing property
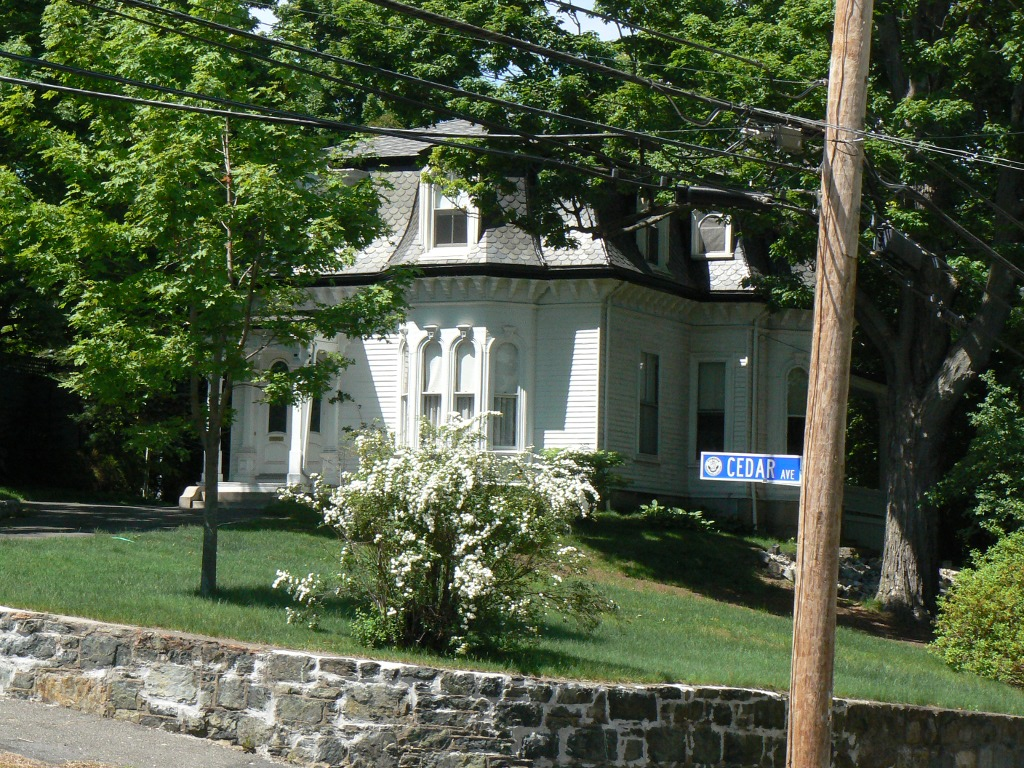

- Location within Massachusetts Location within the United States
- Location: 1 Cedar St., Stoneham, Massachusetts
- Coordinates: 42°28′48″N 71°6′16″W
- Built: 1870
- Architectural style: Second Empire
- Part of: Nobility Hill Historic District (ID89002328)
- MPS: Stoneham MRA
- NRHP reference No.: 84002639

Significant dates
- Added to NRHP: April 13, 1984
- Designated CP: February 9, 1990

The Lorenzo D. Hawkins House is a historic house at 1 Cedar Street in Stoneham, Massachusetts. The property consists of a house and carriage house, both built c. 1870, that are among Stoneham's finest Second Empire buildings. The house is a two-story wood-frame structure with irregular massing. It has the classic mansard roof, an ornately decorated entry porch, heavily bracketed cornice, and round-arch windows in its dormers and front bay. The carriage house features a polychrome mansard roof.

The house was listed on the National Register of Historic Places in 1984, and was included in the Nobility Hill Historic District in 1990.

== See also ==
- National Register of Historic Places listings in Stoneham, Massachusetts
- National Register of Historic Places listings in Middlesex County, Massachusetts
