= Nobility Hill Historic District =

Historic district in Massachusetts, United States

- U.S. National Register of Historic Places
- U.S. Historic district
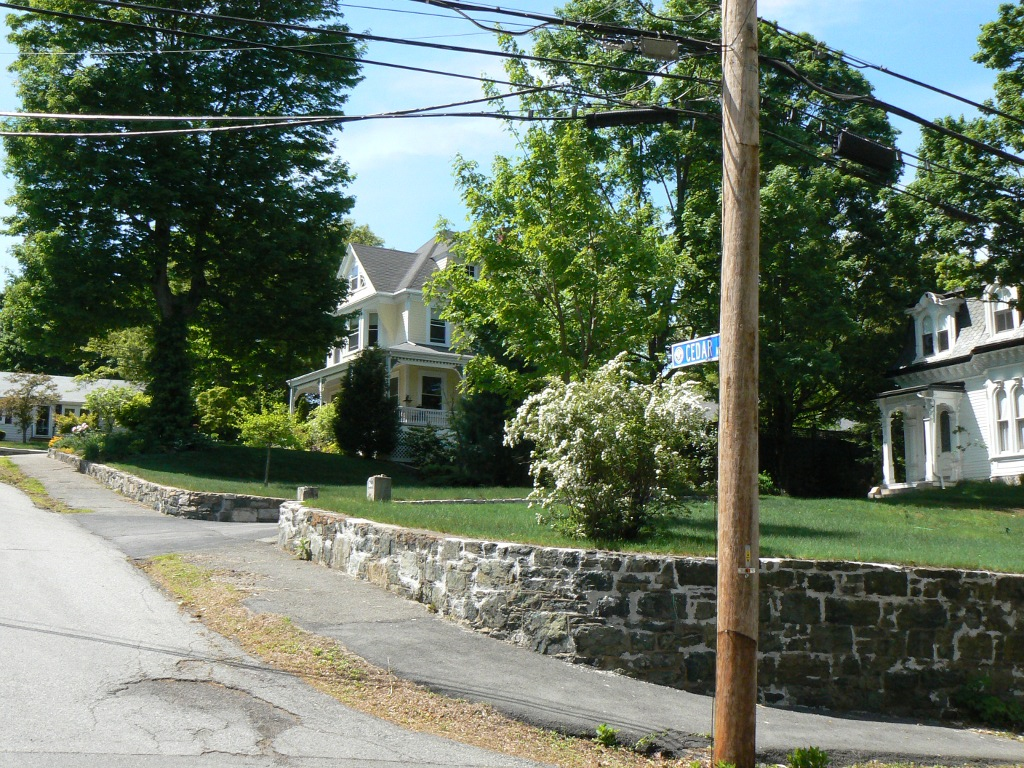

- Location within Massachusetts Location within the United States
- Location: Roughly bounded by Chestnut and Maple Sts. and Cedar Ave., Stoneham, Massachusetts
- Coordinates: 42°28′46″N 71°6′19″W
- Architect: Amasa Farrier
- Architectural style: Colonial Revival, Late Victorian
- MPS: Stoneham MRA
- NRHP reference No.: 89002328
- Added to NRHP: February 9, 1990

The Nobility Hill Historic District is a residential historic district roughly bounded by Chestnut and Maple Streets and Cedar Avenue in Stoneham, Massachusetts. The district includes a number of high quality houses representing a cross section of fashionable housing built between 1860 and 1920. It was added to the National Register of Historic Places in 1990.

== Description and history ==
Nobility Hill is roughly defined as a rectangular area bounded on the north and west by Cedar Avenue, on the south by Maple Street, and on the east by Chestnut Street. The area is located a few blocks west of Main Street and Stoneham's Central Square. Maple and Chestnut Streets are both roads laid out early in the 19th century as through streets. The early significant development in this area was made by some of Stoneham's wealthiest residents (thus giving it its name), notably John Hill and H. H. Mawhinney, both owners of shoe factories, and C. W. Tidd, owner of the Tidd Tannery. The land that made up Hill's estate stands outside the district, on the south side of Maple Street, while Mawhinney's was located on the east side of Chestnut Street, where several houses now stand within the district. The Tidd estate was located in the area mostly occupied by Cedar Avenue and Poplar Street. Neither the Tidd nor Mawhinney estate houses survive, although stone walls and a gate survive from Tidd's, incongruously set in front of mid-20th century ranch houses.

The earliest architectural style to appear in the district is the Italianate, as typified in the house at 35 Chestnut, built about 1860, and a trio of houses at 9, 11, and 13 Cedar, built about 1870. Probably the finest example of the style in the district is the Charles Wood House at 34 Chestnut. The best example of Second Empire architecture is the c. 1870 Lorenzo D. Hawkins House at 1 Cedar. Stick style and Queen Anne houses are probably the most numerous in the district, with particularly fine examples in the Sidney A. Hill House, Newton Lamson House, and the Franklin B. Jenkins House, all in a row at 31-35 Chestnut. The latest building to contribute to the area's significance is the Dutch Colonial at 45 Maple Street; it was built about 1915.

== See also ==
- National Register of Historic Places listings in Stoneham, Massachusetts
