= George J. Hall =

U.S. Medal of Honor recipient

- Born: January 9, 1921; Stoneham, Massachusetts
- Died: February 16, 1946 (aged 25)
- Burial place: Saint Patrick Cemetery, Stoneham, Massachusetts
- Military career
- Allegiance: United States
- Branch: United States Army
- Service years: 1940 - 1945
- Rank: Staff Sergeant
- Units: 135th Infantry Regiment, 34th Infantry Division
- Conflicts: World War II
- Awards: Medal of Honor

George John Hall (January 9, 1921 – February 16, 1946) was a United States Army soldier and a recipient of the United States military's highest decoration—the Medal of Honor—for his actions in World War II.

== Biography ==
Hall joined the Army from Boston, Massachusetts in 1940, and by May 23, 1944, was serving as a staff sergeant in the 135th Infantry Regiment, 34th Infantry Division. On that day, near Anzio, Italy, he single-handedly captured two German machine gun positions and was severely wounded while attempting to take a third, resulting in him having to self-amputate his right leg. For these actions, he was awarded the Medal of Honor on April 6, 1945.

Hall was sent home but died on February 16, 1946, of complications from the wounds he had received at Anzio two years earlier. Aged 25 at his death, he was buried at Saint Patrick Cemetery in his birthplace of Stoneham, Massachusetts.

== Medal of Honor citation ==
Staff Sergeant Hall's official Medal of Honor citation reads:

For conspicuous gallantry and intrepidity at risk of life above and beyond the call of duty. Attacking across flat, open terrain under direct enemy observation, S/Sgt. Hall's company was pinned down by grazing fire from 3 enemy machineguns and harassing sniper fire. S/Sgt. Hall volunteered to eliminate these obstacles in the path of advance. Crawling along a plowed furrow through furious machinegun fire, he made his way to a point within hand grenade range of 1 of the enemy positions. He pounded the enemy with 4 hand grenades, and when the smoke had died away, S/Sgt. Hall and 2 dead Germans occupied the position, while 4 of the enemy were crawling back to our lines as prisoners. Discovering a quantity of German potato-masher grenades in the position, S/Sgt. Hall engaged the second enemy nest in a deadly exchange of grenades. Each time he exposed himself to throw a grenade the Germans fired machinegun bursts at him. The vicious duel finally ended in S/Sgt. Hall's favor with 5 of the enemy surrendered and 5 others lay dead. Turning his attention to the third machinegun, S/Sgt. Hall left his position and crawled along a furrow, the enemy firing frantically in an effort to halt him. As he neared his final objective, an enemy artillery concentration fell on the area, and S/Sgt. Hall's right leg was severed by a shellburst. With 2 enemy machineguns eliminated, his company was able to flank the third and continue its advance without incurring excessive casualties. S/Sgt. Hall's fearlessness, his determined fighting spirit, and his prodigious combat skill exemplify the heroic tradition of the American Infantryman.

== Awards and decorations ==

Badge	Combat Infantryman Badge		
1st row	Medal of Honor		Bronze Star Medal
2nd row	Purple Heart	Army Good Conduct Medal	American Defense Service Medal
3rd row	American Campaign Medal	European–African–Middle Eastern Campaign Medal with three campaign stars	World War II Victory Medal

== See also ==
- List of Medal of Honor recipients
- List of Medal of Honor recipients for World War II
