= Spot Pond Archeological District =

Historic district in Massachusetts, United States

- U.S. National Register of Historic Places
- U.S. Historic district
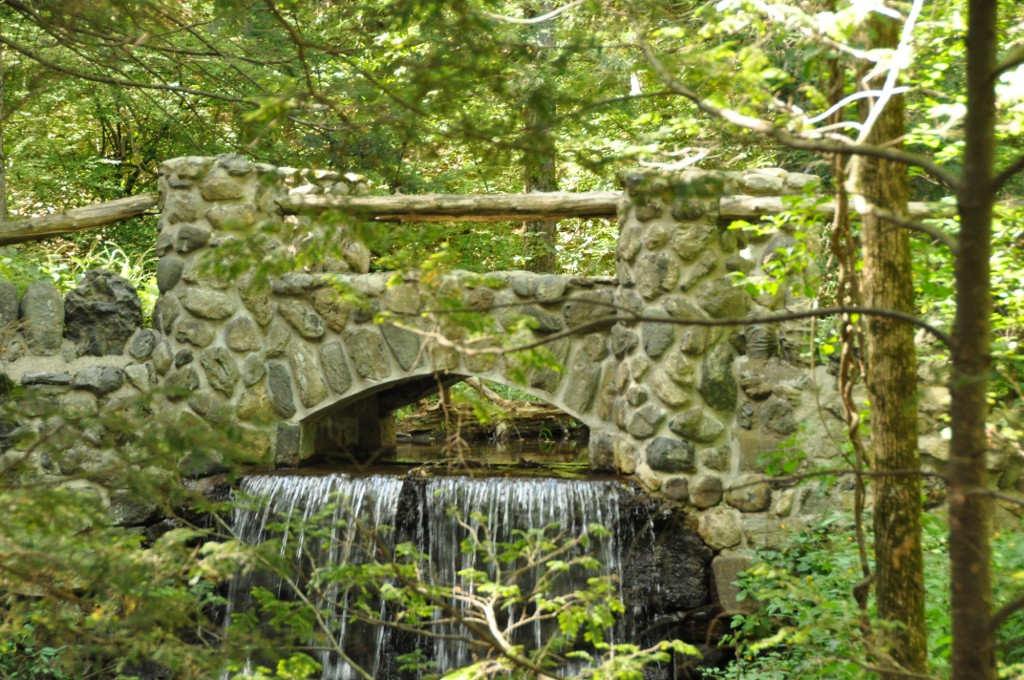
- A footbridge crossing over an 18th century dam across Spot Pond Brook

- Location within Massachusetts Location within the United States
- Nearest city: Stoneham, Massachusetts
- Coordinates: 42°27′21″N 71°5′13″W
- MPS: Stoneham MRA
- NRHP reference No.: 92000925
- Added to NRHP: July 24, 1992

The Spot Pond Archeological District is a historic archaeological site near Spot Pond in Stoneham, Massachusetts. It is located in the Virginia Woods section of the Middlesex Fells Reservation, a state park. The district encompasses sites along Spot Pond Brook that were mill sites dating from the 17th to the 19th centuries. At its height, in the mid-19th century the Hayward Rubber Works was located in the area, giving it the name "Haywardville". One of the park's trails runs through the area, and a park pamphlet provide a self-guided tour joining the major remnants of the industries that once flourished there.

The district was added to the National Register of Historic Places in 1992.

== See also ==
- National Register of Historic Places listings in Stoneham, Massachusetts
- National Register of Historic Places listings in Middlesex County, Massachusetts
