= Sidney A. Hill House =

Historic house in Massachusetts, United States

- U.S. National Register of Historic Places
- U.S. Historic district – Contributing property
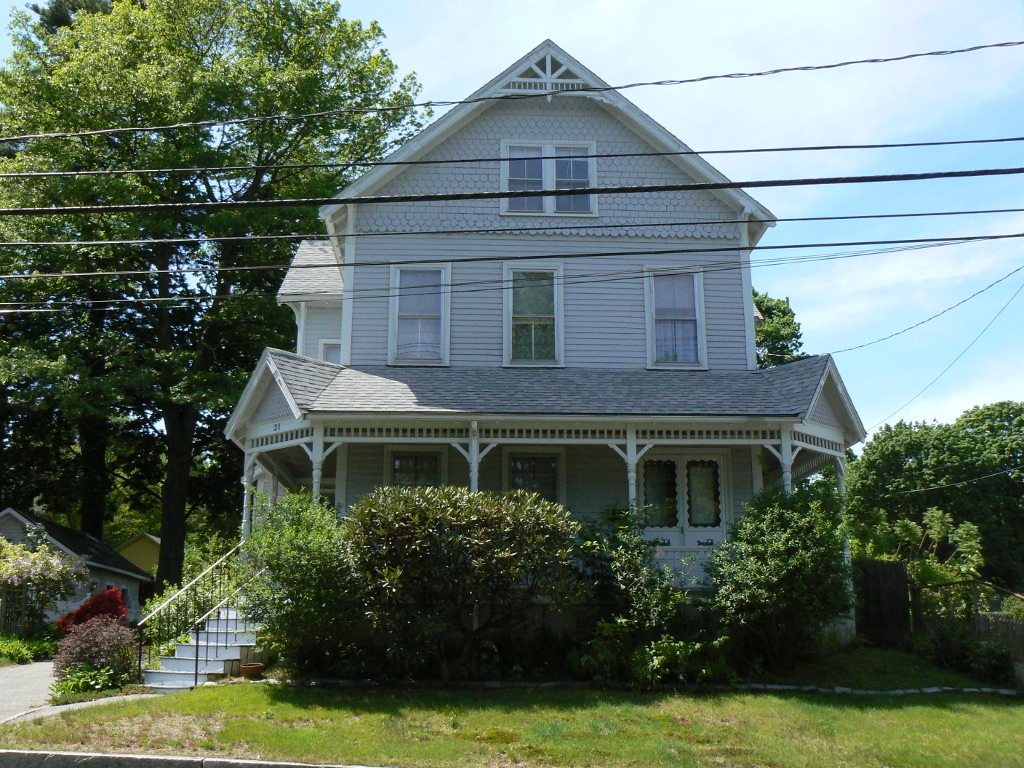

- Location within Massachusetts Location within the United States
- Location: 31 Chestnut St., Stoneham, Massachusetts
- Coordinates: 42°28′44″N 71°6′16″W
- Built: 1895
- Architectural style: Stick/Eastlake, Queen Anne
- Part of: Nobility Hill Historic District (ID89002328)
- MPS: Stoneham MRA
- NRHP reference No.: 84002645

Significant dates
- Added to NRHP: April 13, 1984
- Designated CP: February 9, 1990

The Sidney A. Hill House is a historic house at 31 Chestnut Street in Stoneham, Massachusetts. The Queen Anne style Victorian wood-frame house was built c. 1895 for Sidney A. Hill, a partner in a shoe manufacturing business. The gables of the house feature Stick-style aprons and bands of cut shingles, and a porch that wraps around parts of the front and side of the house that features turned balusters and posts, and more Stick style detailing.

The house was listed on the National Register of Historic Places in 1984, and included in the Nobility Hill Historic District in 1990.

== See also ==
- National Register of Historic Places listings in Stoneham, Massachusetts
- National Register of Historic Places listings in Middlesex County, Massachusetts
