= Franklin B. Jenkins House (Middle Street, Stoneham, Massachusetts) =

Historic house in Massachusetts, United States

- U.S. National Register of Historic Places
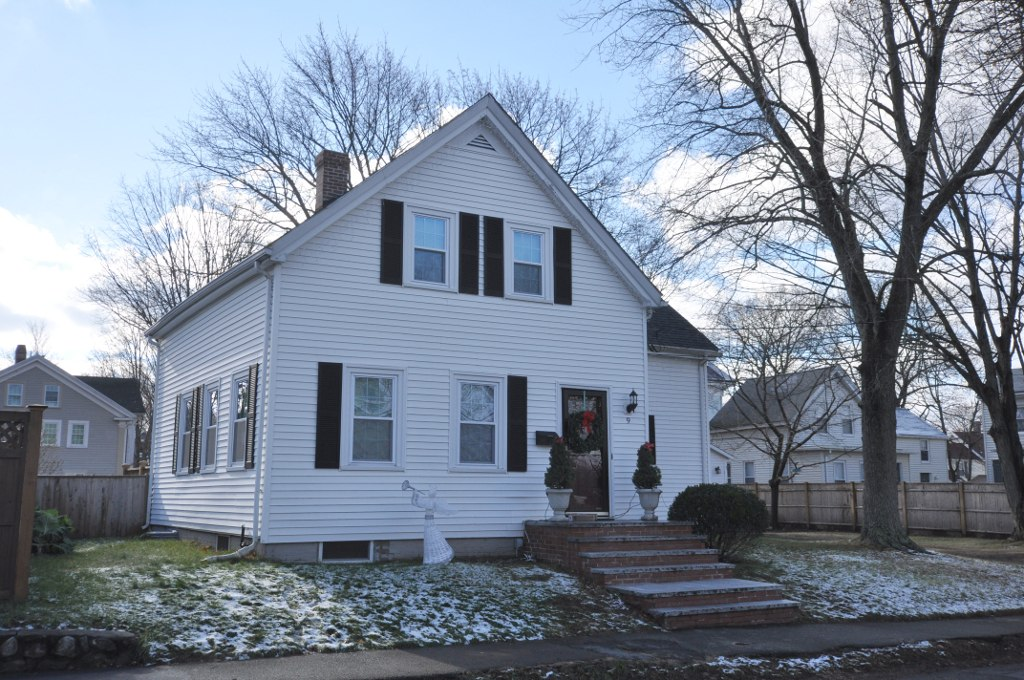

- Location within Massachusetts Location within the United States
- Location: 2 Middle St., Stoneham, Massachusetts
- Coordinates: 42°28′31″N 71°5′59″W
- Built: 1860
- Architectural style: Greek Revival
- MPS: Stoneham MRA
- NRHP reference No.: 84002699
- Added to NRHP: April 13, 1984

The Franklin B. Jenkins House is a historic house at 9 Middle Street in Stoneham, Massachusetts. The house was listed on the National Register of Historic Places in 1984, at which time its address was listed as 2 Middle Street. At that time it was noted for its Greek Revival features, including corner pilasters and a front portico which includes pilasters and sidelights flanking the door. Subsequent residing of the house has obscured or eliminated most of these details (see photo).

The house was built for Franklin B. Jenkins, partner in the shoe manufacturer Jenkins and Vinton. He later built a more elaborate house (also National Register-listed) on Chestnut Street.

== See also ==
- National Register of Historic Places listings in Stoneham, Massachusetts
- National Register of Historic Places listings in Middlesex County, Massachusetts
