= Jenkins–Whelden Farmstead =

- U.S. National Register of Historic Places
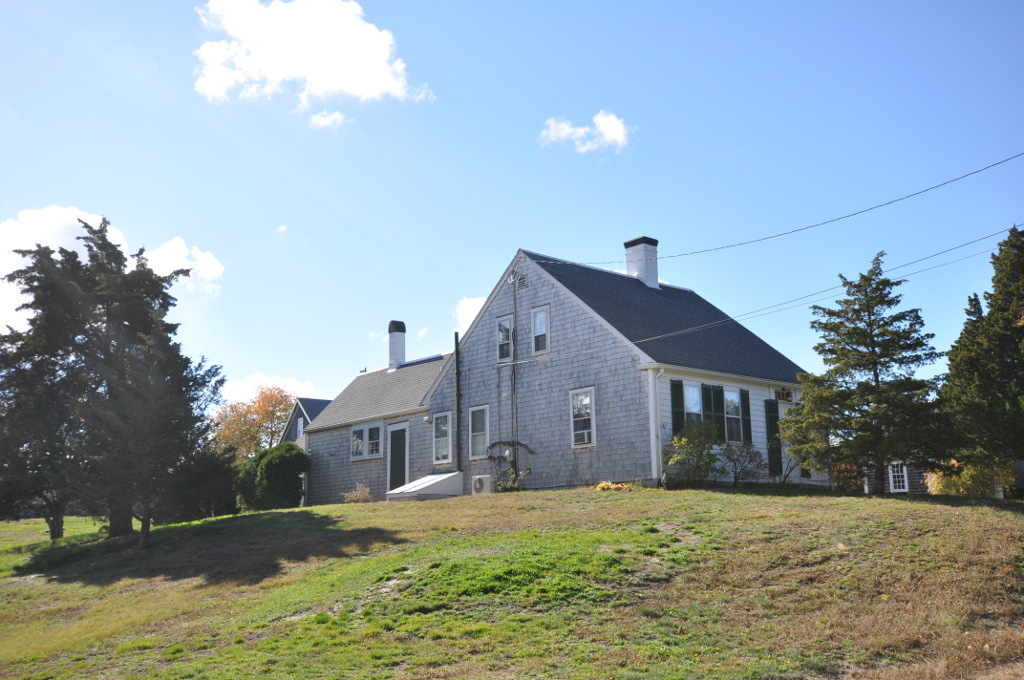

- Location within Cape Cod Location within Massachusetts Location within the United States
- Location: 221 Pine St., Barnstable, Massachusetts
- Coordinates: 41°41′30″N 70°22′29″W
- Area: 4.23 acres (1.71 ha)
- Built: 1700
- Architectural style: Federal
- MPS: Barnstable MRA
- NRHP reference No.: 87000320
- Added to NRHP: March 13, 1987

The Jenkins–Whelden Farmstead is a historic farmstead in Barnstable, Massachusetts. It is one of Barnstable's best-preserved farm properties. The farm complex includes a c. 1840 house, an older 18th century house that is used as a toolshed, two barns, and several other small outbuildings. The current main house is a three-bay 1 1/2-story Cape cottage with Federal styling. The toolshed is believed to have been built by Thomas Jenkins (1666-1745), and was part of a larger house which was originally located on Church Street.

The property was listed on the National Register of Historic Places in 1987.

== See also ==
- National Register of Historic Places listings in Barnstable County, Massachusetts
