= Stone Zoo =

- Interactive map of Stone Zoo
- 42.462961°N 71.092947°W
- Date opened: 1905
- Location: Stoneham, Massachusetts, United States
- Land area: 26 acres (11 ha)
- No. of animals: 797
- No. of species: 87
- Memberships: AZA
- Director: John Linehan
- Website: www.zoonewengland.org/stone-zoo

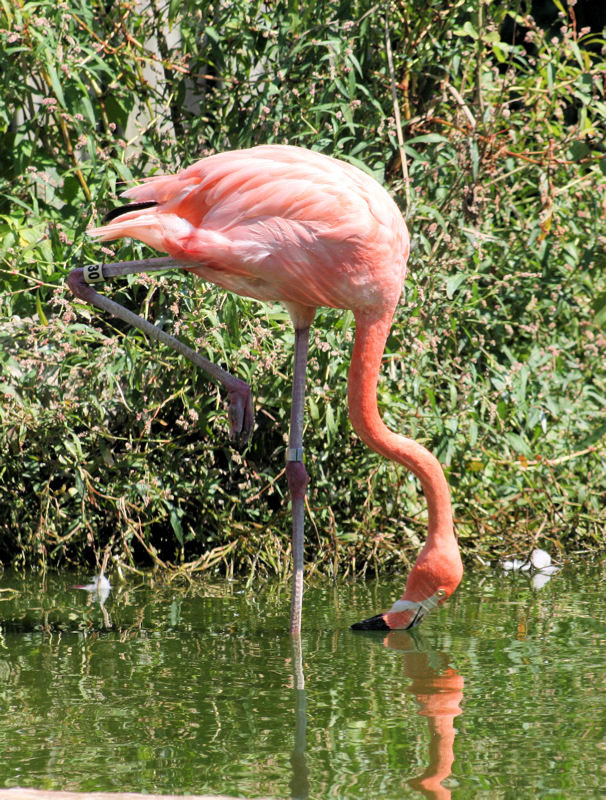
A flamingo at Stone Zoo

Stone Zoo is a medium- to small-sized zoo of about 26 acres (11 ha) in Stoneham, Massachusetts, United States. Founded in 1905, the zoo includes low-lying areas densely developed with smaller exhibits for animals as well as rocky forested hillsides devoted to larger habitats for Species Survival Plan programs. It is operated by the Commonwealth Zoological Corporation, doing business as Zoo New England, which also operates the Franklin Park Zoo in Boston.

Stone Zoo is an accredited member of the Association of Zoos and Aquariums.

== History ==
The Stone Zoo was founded in 1905 as the Middlesex Fells Zoo, a small collection of local animals which soon began to include more exotic species. A new attraction, the Kiddy Zoo, largely based on Mother Goose stories, opened in the 1950s. In the 1960s, the zoo underwent major renovations under the guidance of zoo director Walter D. Stone, including the construction of a large free-flight aviary. The renovation project saw the inclusion of elephants, giraffes, zebras, pygmy hippopotamus, sea lions, and many other large animals. On March 14, 1969, the zoo was renamed the Walter D. Stone Memorial Zoo, following his death in 1968.

The zoo continued to operate through the 1970s and 1980s and began breeding endangered species, including orangutans, kinkajous, siamang, and kudus. A polar bear named "Major" arrived in July 1979, and soon became the zoo's main attraction.

On November 12, 1990, state budget cuts caused the Stone Zoo to cease operation. Following public outcry, the state senate established a private, non-profit corporation to manage the zoo, with the help of fund-raising and donations, and the zoo reopened on June 6, 1992. During this transition period, the zoo fell into disrepair and lost all of its large animals, with the exception of Major who remained until his death in 2000. The zoo rapidly declined in quality and attendance. Old facilities were repurposed including using the former giraffe house as an animal education center.

=== Recent developments ===
In the early 2000s, Zoo New England began a fund-raising campaign to reinvigorate both the Stone Zoo and the Franklin Park Zoo.

On September 24, 2005, Stone Zoo celebrated its 100th anniversary. The zoo layout was modified to make the grounds interesting and educational, despite the lack of large animals. Many new exhibits were created and existing ones expanded or upgraded. These improvements have been credited with increasing zoo attendance.

A Massachusetts Bay Transportation Authority (MBTA) bus stop for bus line 132 is across the street at Greenwood Park.

== Exhibit areas ==
The major exhibits and animals on display are:

- North American Wetlands (c. 2012): Home totundra swans and whooping cranes (c. 2014).
- Animal Discovery Center (c. 2017): Home corn snakes, dyeing poison dart frogs, eastern box turtles, green and black poison dart frogs, leopard geckos,Panamanian golden frogs, and rosy boas.
- Barnyard: Home to Nigerian dwarf goats, Nubian goats, Southdown sheep, and various chicken breeds. This section also features a 'nature playscape' playground.
- Caribbean Coast (c. 2018): A 6,000-square-foot (560 m^{2}) walk-through aviary featuring blue and gold macaws, Caribbean flamingo, Barrow’s GoldenEye, Scaly-Sided Mergansers, green winged macaws, Jamaican iguanas, scarlet ibises, and scarlet macaws. Nearby, there is the Butterfly Oasis, with various species of Butterfly, and a breeding pair of bush dog exhibit (the only one of its kind in New England) which displays a breeding pair. The pair had two pups, one male and one female born in November 2018.
- Himalayan Highlands (c. 1998): Home to markhors and snow leopards.
- Mexican Gray Wolf Exhibit (c. 1998): Was home to a single lone Mexican wolf named Roberto. He died in October 2019. In early 2020, the zoo now has a sibling pack of six, adolescent wolves that now roam the hillside habitat.
- Treasures of the Sierra Madre (c. 2002): Recreating the Sierra Madre mountains, the exhibit houses Chacoan peccaries, Great Horned Owl, cougars, Gila monsters, Spiny Tailed Iguanas, Chuckwallas, jaguars, peregrine falcons, pueblan milk snakes, ringtail, and Seba's short-tailed bats.
- Treetops & Riverbeds (c. 2008): An open-air environment with has exhibits for black-and-white colobuses, North American river otters, and northern white-cheeked gibbons.
- Windows to the Wild (c. 2003): Home to barn owl, cotton-top tamarins, fennec foxes, Linne's two-toed sloths, long-tailed chinchillas, prehensile-tailed porcupines, Keel-Billed Toucans, and rock hyraxes. A tortoise exhibit featuring a duo of African spurred tortoises opened in the former flamingo grotto in July 2019.
- Yukon Creek (c. 2000): Simulates the Canadian boreal forest; home to American black bears, Arctic foxes, bald eagles, Canada lynxes, North American porcupines, and reindeers.
