= Joseph J. Jenkins House =

- U.S. National Register of Historic Places
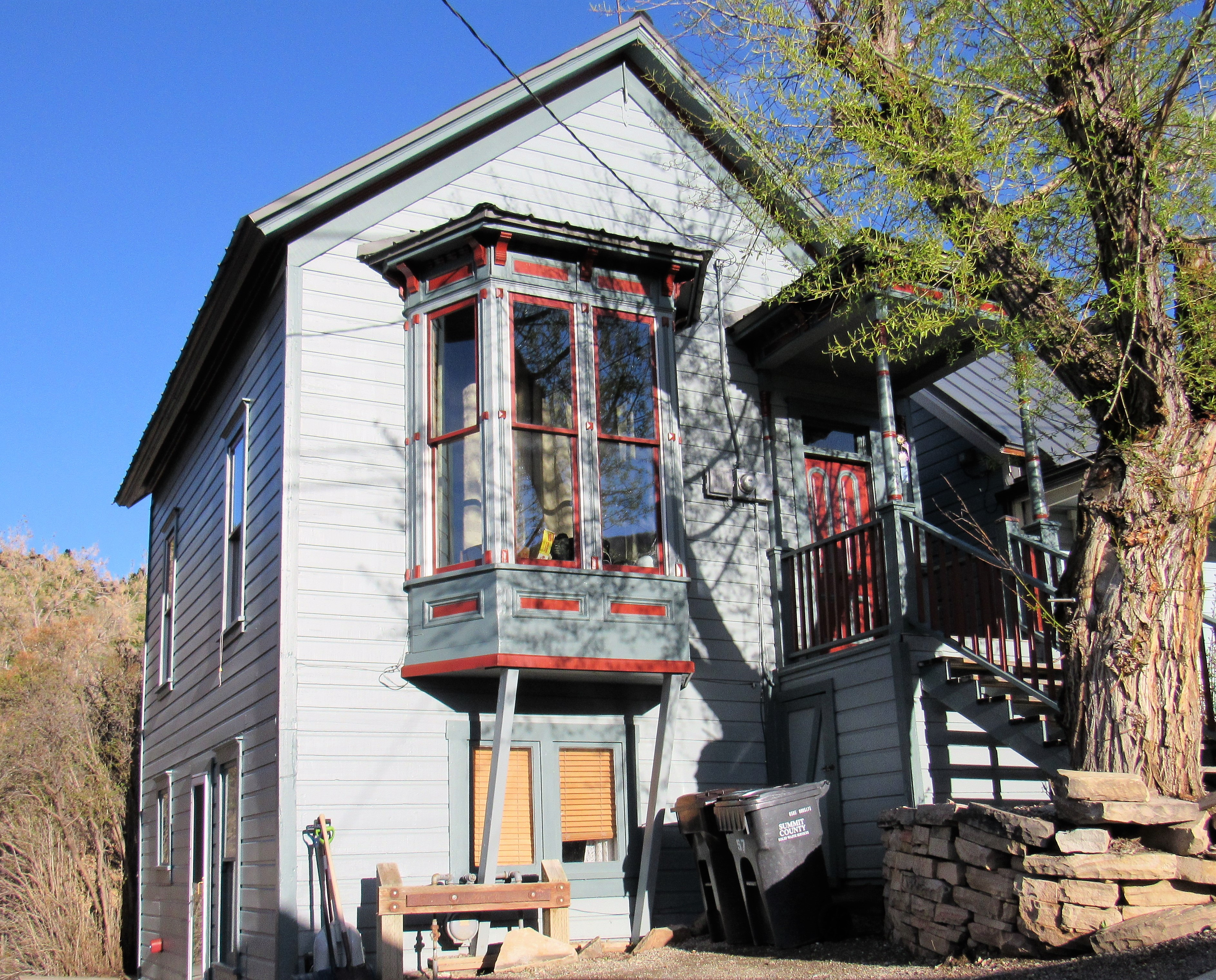

- Location within Utah Location within the United States
- Location: 27 Prospect Ave. Park City, Utah
- Coordinates: 40°38′19″N 111°29′34″W
- Area: less than one acre
- Built: 1891
- Architectural style: Italianate
- MPS: Mining Boom Era Houses TR
- NRHP reference No.: 84002315
- Added to NRHP: July 12, 1984

The Joseph J. Jenkins House, at 27 Prospect Ave. in Park City, Utah, was built in 1891. It was listed on the National Register of Historic Places in 1984.

It is a two-story house set into a hillside, with a lower floor and a main floor above it, and gable end to the front. It has an Italianate-style bay window on the front. Its entrance is on the side, up a set of stairs to a small hip roof porch with the entrance door. The porch also reflects Italianate style in its turned piers and straight post balustrade.

In 1984 it was deemed "architecturally significant as a one of a kind house type in Park City. The majority of Park City houses were built as hall and parlor houses, T/L cottages, pyramid houses or variants of the pyramid house. Shotgun houses and bungalows occur in fewer numbers, but were also significant types. About 20% of the in-period extant buildings in Park City, including 57 Prospect, did not specifically fit into any one category or were altered so dramatically that the original type was not identifiable. The bay window and small porch superficially link this building with the Italianate style. The gable roofed form, however, is more like that of 1101 Norfolk, a house which, from the exterior, looks like a shotgun, but which in effect is only a square house with a gable roof. The house at 57 Prospect is a unique house that was created by combining popular Italianate decorative features with a more standard house form. This house documents the fact that although standard house types were the rule in Park City, exceptions to the standard types were also built. It is one of only three well preserved examples of houses that are exceptions to the standard types, all of which are included in this nomination."

It was built in 1891 by Joseph J. and Sarah J. Jenkins, who came from Virginia City, Nevada where Joseph had worked in the Comstock Mine. He worked as a miner for the Ontario Silver Mining Company for many years, and then from 1893 to 1897 served as assessor and collector for Summit County. With Joseph failing in health from miner's consumption, the Jenkins sold the house in 1897 and moved to Salt Lake City in 1897, but Joseph died less than two years later.
