= John Jenkins Homestead =

Historic house in Massachusetts, United States

- U.S. National Register of Historic Places
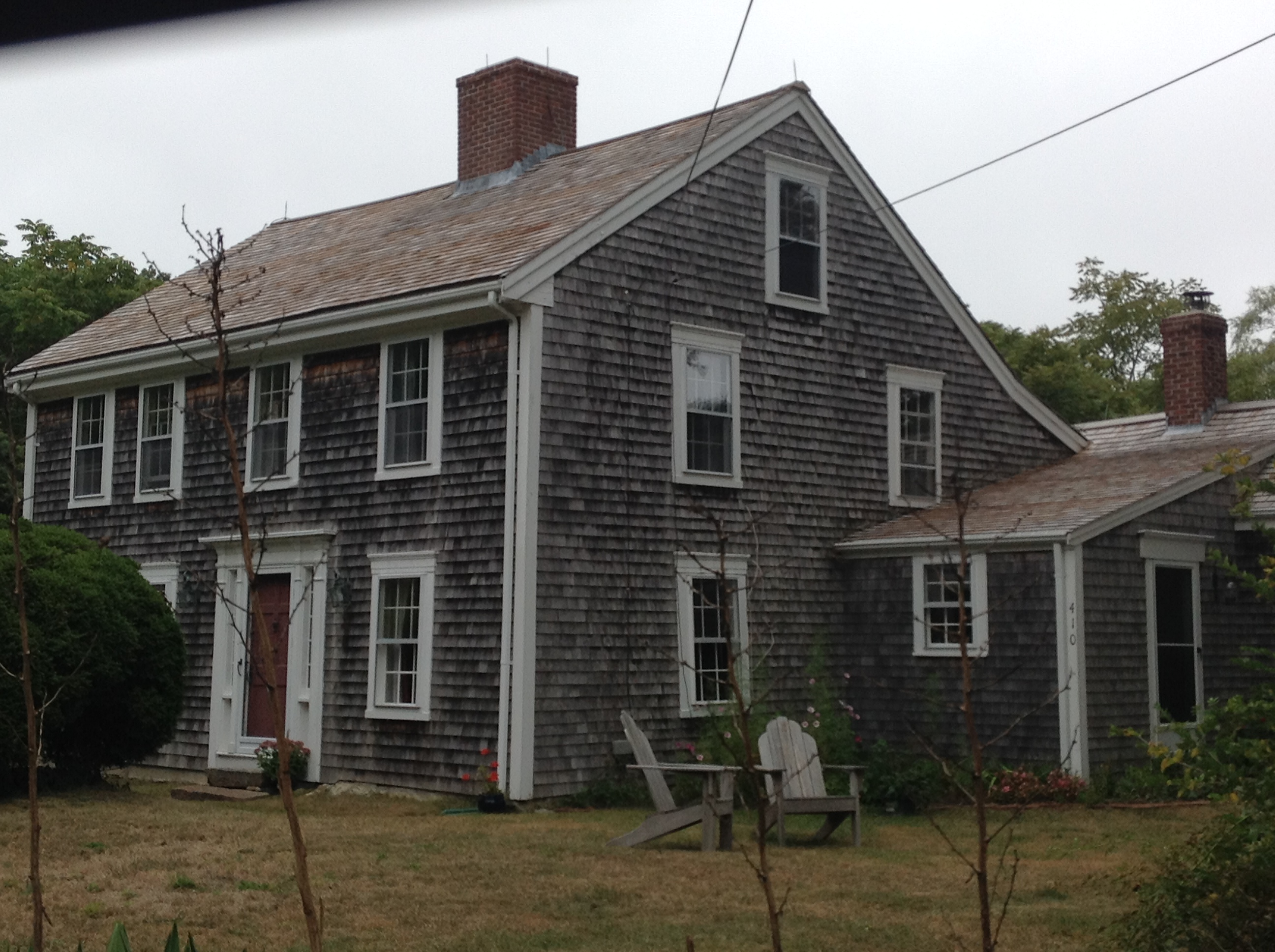

- Location within Cape Cod Location within Massachusetts Location within the United States
- Location: 410 Church Street, Barnstable, Massachusetts
- Coordinates: 41°41′41″N 70°22′12″W
- Built: 1683
- Architectural style: Colonial
- MPS: Barnstable MRA
- NRHP reference No.: 87000318
- Added to NRHP: March 13, 1987

The John Jenkins Homestead is a historic house located in Barnstable, Massachusetts.

== Description and history ==
The 2 1/2-story wood-frame house contains building materials, including elements of chimneys and fireplaces, that date to the 1680s. Although it has been altered frequently in the intervening centuries, the house is now styled in a late Georgian or early Federalist manner. The house is notable for its associations with a number of prominent individuals. The first settler of the land, John Jenkins, may have been the house's builder. The property became known locally as the "Old Parsonage" due to its ownership by the Reverend Oakes Shaw between 1706 and 1807. Shaw was the father of Lemuel Shaw, who served for thirty years as Chief Justice of the Massachusetts Supreme Judicial Court.

The house was listed on the National Register of Historic Places on March 13, 1987.

== See also ==
- National Register of Historic Places listings in Barnstable County, Massachusetts
