= Joseph Jenkins House =

Historic house in Massachusetts, United States

- U.S. National Register of Historic Places
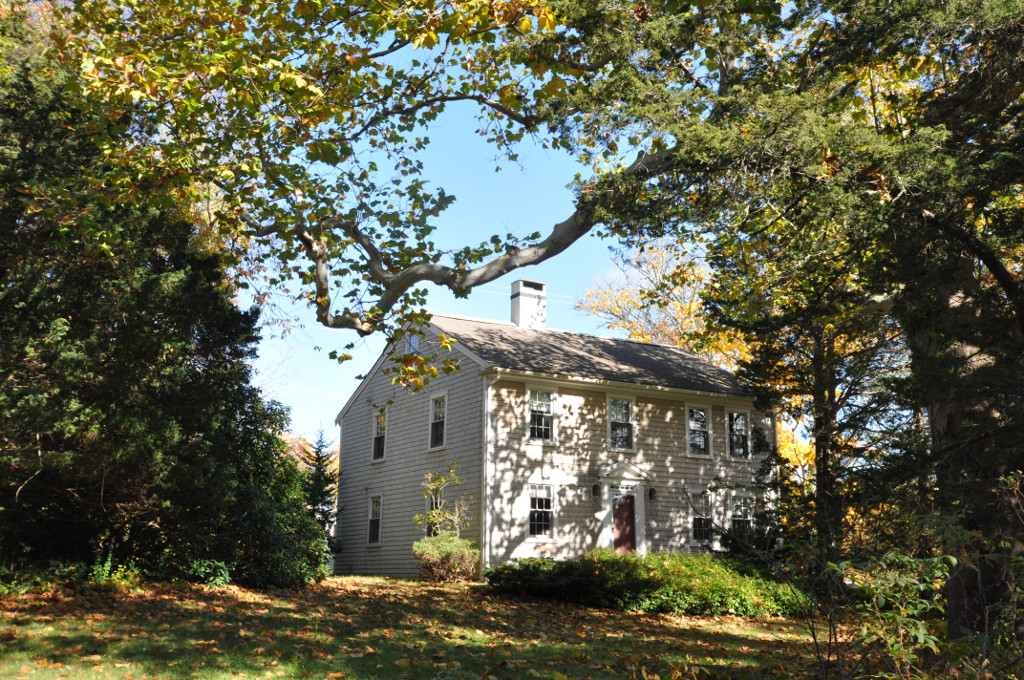

- Location within Cape Cod Location within Massachusetts Location within the United States
- Location: 310 Pine St., Barnstable, Massachusetts
- Coordinates: 41°41′29″N 70°22′15″W
- Built: 1750
- Architectural style: Federal
- MPS: Barnstable MRA
- NRHP reference No.: 87000322
- Added to NRHP: March 13, 1987

The Joseph Jenkins House stands as a historic landmark in Barnstable, Massachusetts. Constructed around 1750 by Joseph Jenkins, this 2+1/2-story wood-frame house serves as a testament to the early history of West Barnstable. Characterized by its well-preserved structure, the house features four bays in width, an off-center chimney, and an entryway. The main entrance is adorned with plain trim, complemented by a transom window and a triangular pediment. Throughout the 19th century, the property remained in the ownership of the Jenkins family.

The house was listed on the National Register of Historic Places in 1987.

== See also ==
- National Register of Historic Places listings in Barnstable County, Massachusetts
