= Franklin B. Jenkins House (Chestnut Street, Stoneham, Massachusetts) =

Historic house in Massachusetts, United States

- U.S. National Register of Historic Places
- U.S. Historic district – Contributing property
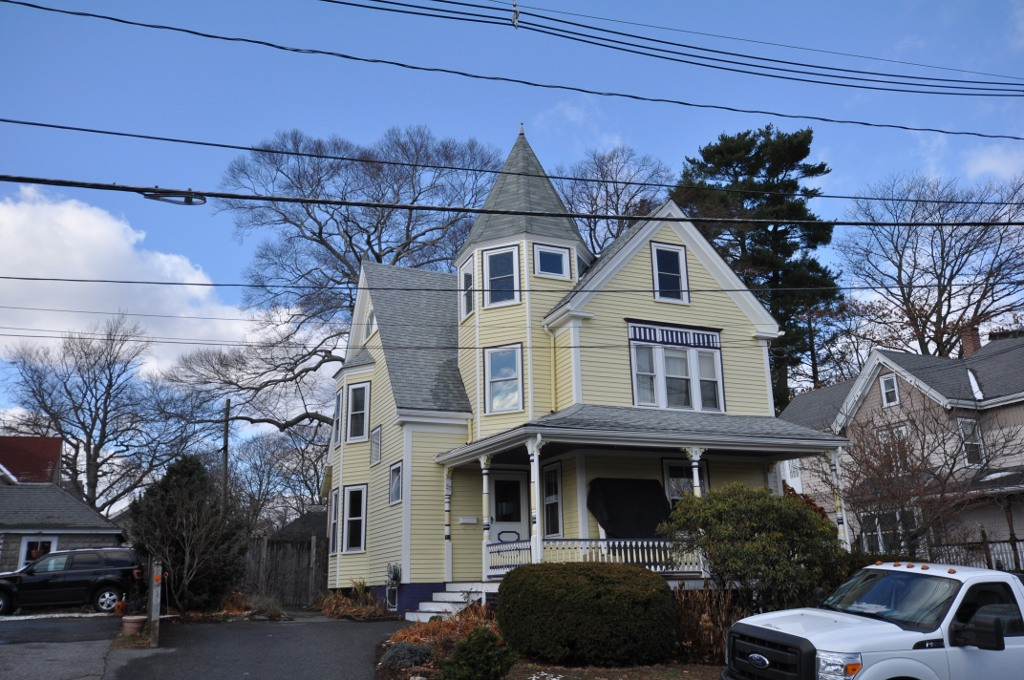

- Location within Massachusetts Location within the United States
- Location: 37 Chestnut St., Stoneham, Massachusetts
- Coordinates: 42°28′47″N 71°6′16″W
- Built: 1895
- Architectural style: Queen Anne
- Part of: Nobility Hill Historic District (ID89002328)
- MPS: Stoneham MRA
- NRHP reference No.: 84002702

Significant dates
- Added to NRHP: April 13, 1984
- Designated CP: February 9, 1990

The Franklin B. Jenkins House is a historic house at 37 Chestnut Street in Stoneham, Massachusetts. Built c. 1895, it is one of Stoneham's finest Queen Anne Victorian houses. The 2 1/2-story wood-frame house has an L shape, with a distinctive octagonal turret section at the crook of the L. A porch with turned posts and balusters wraps around the front and side to the turret section.

The house was listed on the National Register of Historic Places in 1984, where it is listed at 35 Chestnut Street. It was also included in the Nobility Hill Historic District in 1990.

== See also ==
- Franklin B. Jenkins House (2 Middle Street, Stoneham, Massachusetts), also NRHP-listed in Stoneham
- National Register of Historic Places listings in Stoneham, Massachusetts
- National Register of Historic Places listings in Middlesex County, Massachusetts
