= Stoneham, Massachusetts =

Town in Massachusetts, U.S.

- Town
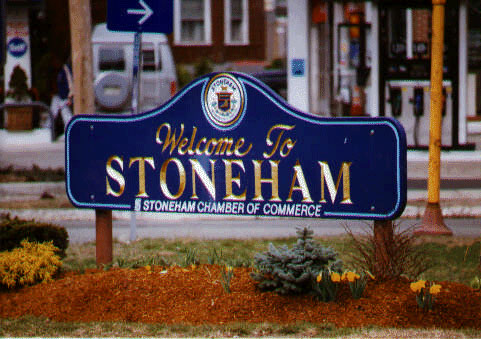
- Welcome sign

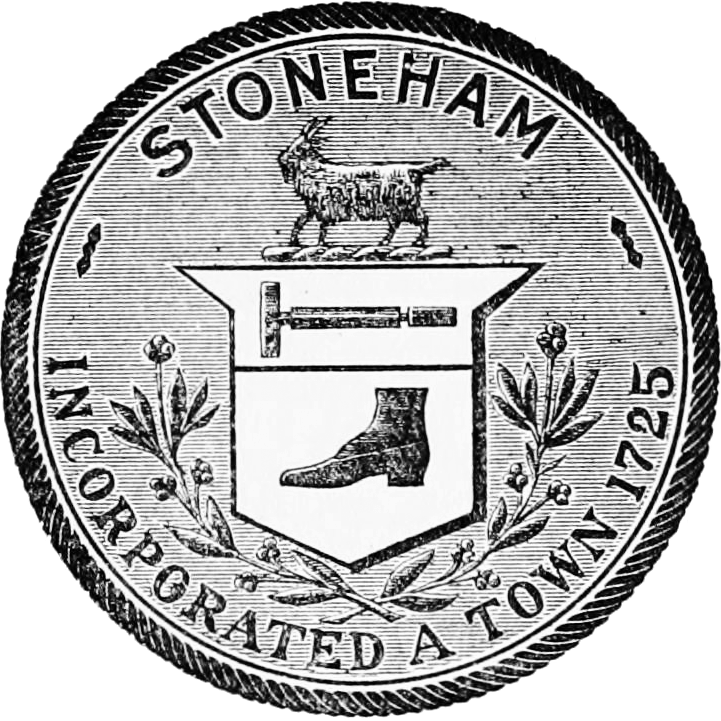
- Seal

- Location in Middlesex County in Massachusetts
- Coordinates: 42°28′48″N 71°06′00″W
- Country: United States
- State: Massachusetts
- County: Middlesex
- Settled: 1645
- Incorporated: 1725

Government
  - Type: Open town meeting

Area
  - Total: 6.7 sq mi (17.4 km^{2})
  - Land: 6.1 sq mi (15.9 km^{2})
  - Water: 0.58 sq mi (1.5 km^{2})
- Elevation: 154 ft (47 m)

Population (2020)
  - Total: 23,244
  - Density: 3,790/sq mi (1,460/km^{2})
- Time zone: UTC-5 (Eastern)
  - Summer (DST): UTC-4 (Eastern)
- ZIP Code: 02180
- Area code: 339 / 781
- FIPS code: 25-67665
- GNIS feature ID: 0618235
- Website: www.stoneham-ma.gov

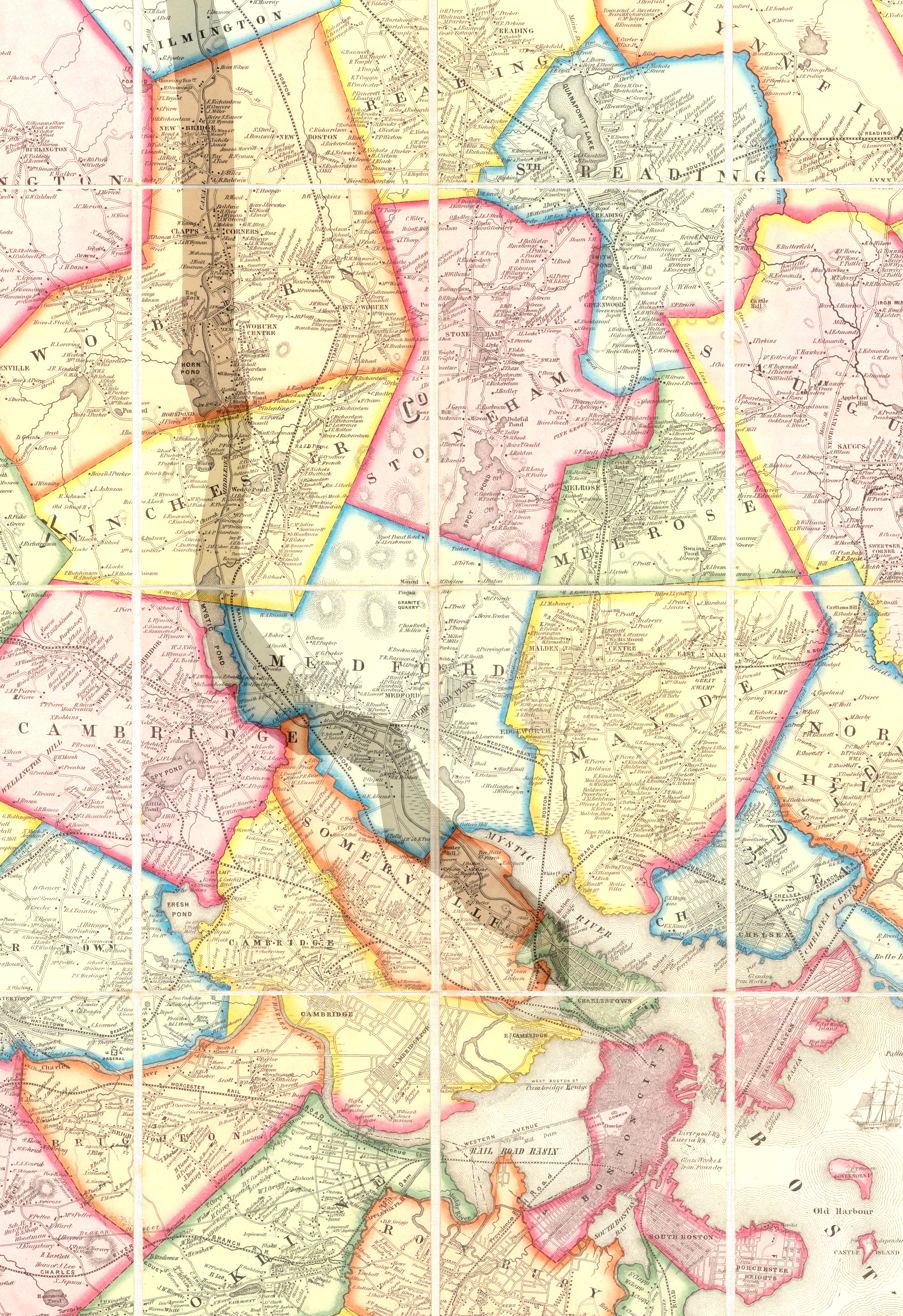
1852 map of Boston area showing Stoneham

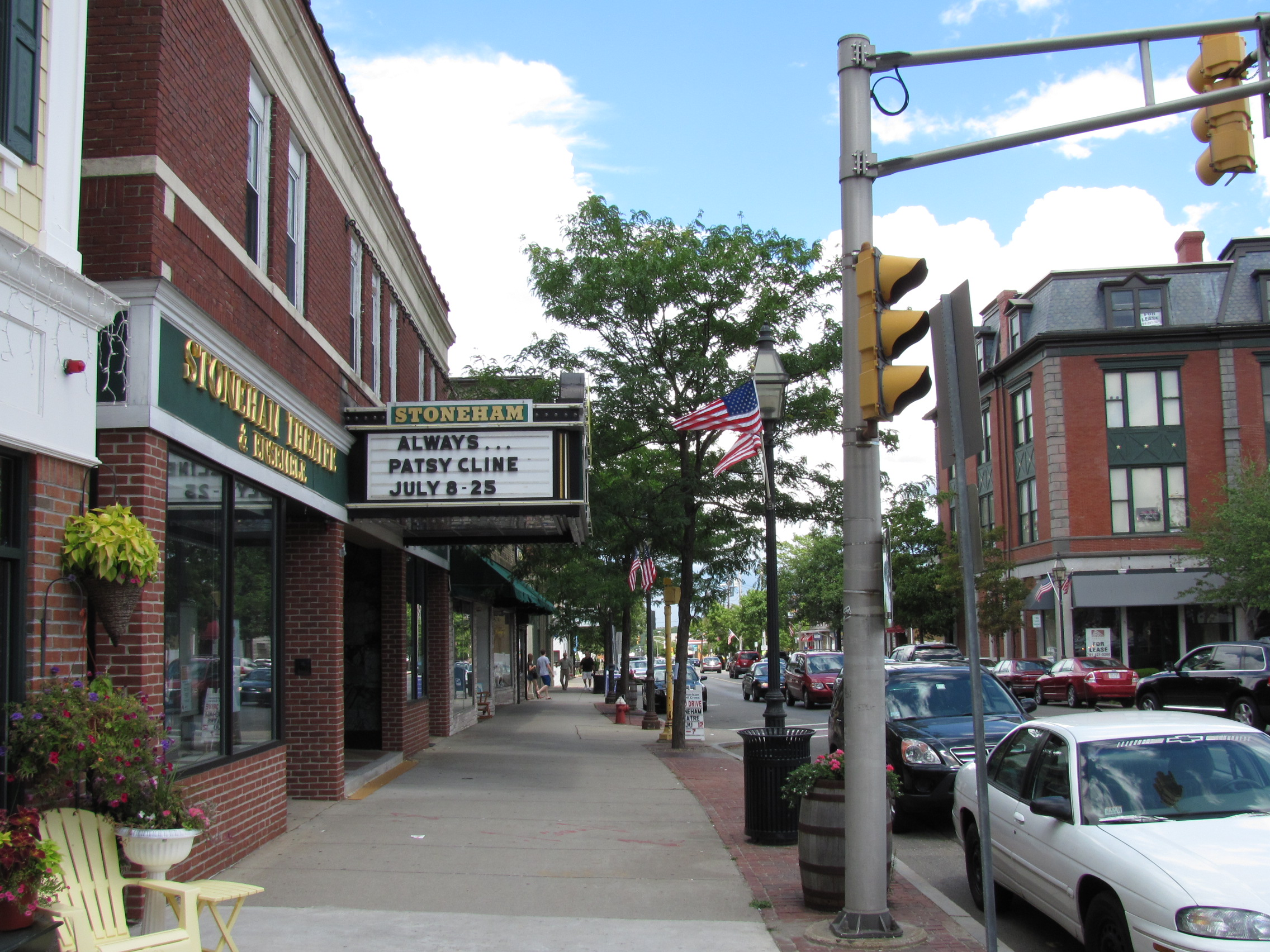
Main Street at the Stoneham Theatre

Stoneham (/ˈstoʊnəm/ STO-nəm) is a town in Middlesex County, Massachusetts, United States, nine miles (14 km) north of downtown Boston. Its population was 23,244 at the 2020 census. Its proximity to major highways and public transportation offers convenient access to Boston and the North Shore coastal region and beaches of Massachusetts. The town is the birthplace of the Olympic figure-skating medalist Nancy Kerrigan and is the location of the Stone Zoo.

== History ==
The earliest documented mention of the territory now called Stoneham dates to 1632 when, on February 7, Governor Winthrop and his party came upon this area. They found Spot Pond and ate their lunch on a place they called Cheese Rock, now known as Bear Hill. Stoneham is situated on the traditional territory of the Massachusett and Pawtucket peoples.

Stoneham was first settled by colonists in 1634 and was originally a part of Charlestown. In 1678, there were six colonists with their families, all in the northeast part of the town, probably because of its proximity to the settlement in Reading (now Wakefield).

By 1725, the population of the area, called "Charlestown End", had increased until there were 65 male inhabitants paying taxes; however, they were miles away from the settlement in Charlestown and could not conveniently reach its church or school. For this reason, Captain Benjamin Geary and 53 other residents of the area petitioned Charlestown to allow them to be separated. The town refused their petition at first, but on December 17, 1725, the General Court passed an act to establish the new township of Stoneham, separating it from Charlestown, and releasing its residents from the obligation to pay taxes to Charlestown, provided that within two years they would erect a suitable church and hire a minister and a schoolmaster.

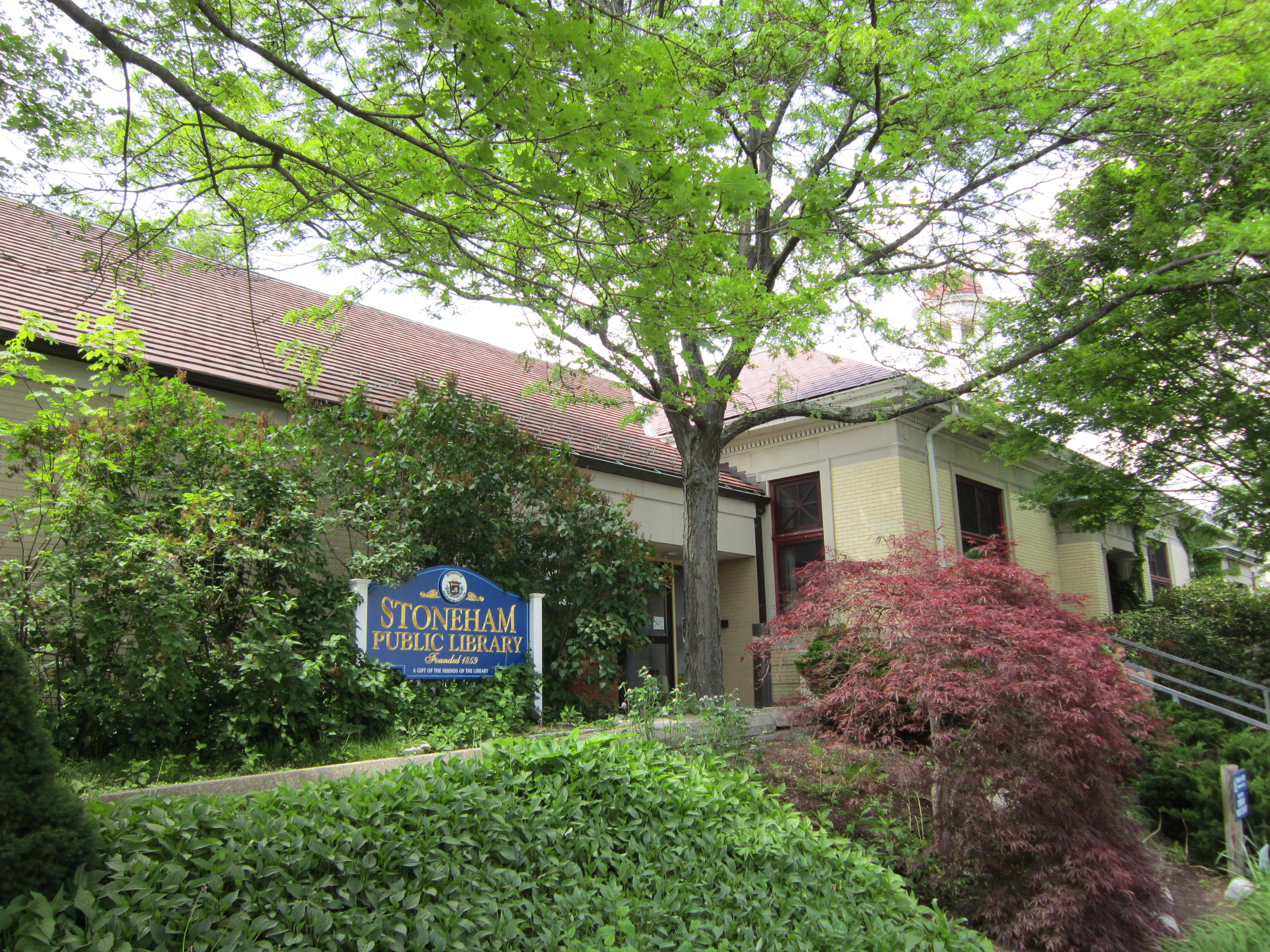
Stoneham Public Library

The town's first meetinghouse was erected in 1726, as was its Burying Ground (now known as the Old Burying Ground and listed on the National Register of Historic Places in 1984). The first church was organized in 1729, with members being released from the congregations in Reading and Melrose to form it. In the same year, the town voted to raise £9 for the building of a school and chose a committee to hire a schoolmaster. Stoneham remained a small town during the colonial era. Traces of its colonial history are still to be seen in the Spot Pond Archeological District of the Middlesex Fells Reservation. During the Industrial Revolution, Stoneham prospered as a major shoe-manufacturing center.

== Government ==
Stoneham is part of the Massachusetts's 5th congressional district and is represented by Katherine Clark. The United States Senators are Ed Markey and Elizabeth Warren. Part of the 31st Middlesex District, Mike Day represents the district in the Massachusetts House of Representatives. He replaced Jason Lewis who now represents Stoneham in the Massachusetts Senate for the 5th Middlesex Senate district.

== Geography ==
Stoneham is located at 42°28′48″N 71°5′54″W (42.480145, −71.098352).

According to the United States Census Bureau, the town has a total area of 6.7 square miles (17 km^{2}), of which 6.2 square miles (16 km^{2}) is land and 0.6 square miles (1.6 km^{2}), or 8.36%, is water.

Stoneham has two exits off Interstate 93, Winchester Highlands and Montvale Avenue, and one exit off Interstate 95, Route 28.

Stoneham borders the following cities or towns: Woburn, Winchester, Medford, Malden, Melrose, Wakefield, and Reading.

== Demographics ==
Historical population
Year	Pop.	±%
1725	250*	—
1790	381	—
1800	312	−18.1%
1810	467	+49.7%
1820	615	+31.7%
1830	732	+19.0%
1840	1,017	+38.9%
1850	2,085	+105.0%
1860	3,206	+53.8%
1870	4,513	+40.8%
1880	4,890	+8.4%
1890	6,155	+25.9%
1900	6,197	+0.7%
1910	7,090	+14.4%
1920	7,873	+11.0%
1930	10,060	+27.8%
1940	10,765	+7.0%
1950	13,229	+22.9%
1960	17,821	+34.7%
1970	20,725	+16.3%
1980	21,424	+3.4%
1990	22,203	+3.6%
2000	22,219	+0.1%
2010	21,437	−3.5%
2020	23,244	+8.4%
2024*	24,550	+5.6%
* = population estimate. Source: United States census records and Population Estimates Program data.

As of the 2022 American Community Survey estimates, there were 22,992 people and 9,654 households. The population density was 3,821.8 inhabitants per square mile (1,475.6/km^{2}). There were 9,904 housing units at an average density of 1,646.3 per square mile (635.6/km^{2}). The racial makeup of the city was 83.6% White, 7.4% Asian, 1.9% some other race, and 1.6% Black or African American, with 5.5% from two or more races. Hispanics or Latinos of any race were 4.7% of the population.

Of the 9,654 households, 25.9% had children under the age of 18 living with them, 35.1% had seniors 65 years or older living with them, 51.2% were married couples living together, 6.3% were couples cohabitating, 14.7% had a male householder with no partner present, and 27.7% had a female householder with no partner present. The median household size was 2.37 and the median family size was 3.01.

The age distribution was 19.7% under 18, 4.8% from 18 to 24, 30.4% from 25 to 44, 25.6% from 45 to 64, and 19.5% who were 65 or older. The median age was 42.1 years. For every 100 females, there were 90.6 males.

The median income for a household was $112,935, with family households having a median income of $153,873 and non-family households $61,908. The per capita income was $60,043. Out of the 22,864 people with a determined poverty status, 4.7% were below the poverty line. Further, 3.1% of minors and 8.0% of seniors were below the poverty line.

In the survey, residents self-identified with various ethnic ancestries. People of Italian descent made up 27.5% of the population of the town, followed by Irish at 26.9%, English at 8.7%, German at 3.9%, French at 3.3%, Arab at 3.1%, American at 2.5%, French Canadian at 2.4%, Portuguese at 2.3%, Greek at 2.2%, Polish at 1.9%, Scottish at 1.3%, Ukrainian at 0.9%, Norwegian at 0.8%, Lithuanian at 0.7%, Russian at 0.6%, Swedish at 0.5%, and Scotch-Irish at 0.5%.

== Transportation ==
Stoneham is inside the Route 128 belt that delineates the core of metropolitan Boston. Public transportation is available in or near Stoneham. The Tri-Community Greenway path goes through Stoneham accessible to walkers/bikers. The Oak Grove subway station is 3.8 miles (6.1 km) from Stoneham Center, in Malden, and is the northern terminus of the MBTA's Orange Line. Several commuter rail stations are in bordering communities of Melrose, Winchester, Wakefield, Reading, Medford, Woburn and Malden, each providing transportation to Boston's North Station. The MBTA's 132 bus route travels through Stoneham Center, offering transportation to the Orange Line at Oak Grove and Malden Center Station. Interstate 93 passes through Stoneham, and Route 128/Interstate 95 passes just to the north of the town.

== Education ==
The school district is Stoneham School District.

Stoneham has one public high school (Stoneham High School) and one public middle school (Stoneham Central Middle School). There are also three public elementary schools (Colonial Park School, Robin Hood School and South School) in the town.

The private Seventh-day Adventist school Greater Boston Academy offers programs for Pre-K to grade 8, and Saint Patrick School, a Catholic school (of the Roman Catholic Archdiocese of Boston), conducts programs from Pre-K level to grade 8.

== Media ==
Stoneham is served by Boston television and radio stations, the Boston Herald, the Boston Globe and the Stoneham Independent newspaper. Stoneham has a community-access television station, StonehamTV, which broadcasts locally produced content on Comcast, Verizon and RCN cable systems.

== Nine O'Clock Horn ==
The Nine O'clock Horn, or Nine O'clock Bell/Alarm, is a horn that goes off from the Stoneham Fire Station every day at 9 a.m. and 9 p.m. Originally, the number of blasts of the horn was used to signal different groups to fight fires or alert the town of other emergencies such as a missing child. The 9 a.m and 9 p.m. horns are officially used to test the alert system; however, Stoneham Fire staff have stated that these horns remain primarily as a tradition. The horn system is entirely automated.

== Notable people ==
- Ben Bagdikian, (1920–2006), journalist and author, helped publish the Pentagon Papers
- Harland Bartholomew, urban planner, active 1911–1962
- Frank N. Blanchard (1888–1937), herpetologist, born in Stoneham
- William Francis Buckley (1927–1985), US Army Officer and CIA Bureau Chief, kidnapped and killed in Lebanon
- Mario Cantone (born 1959), comedian and actor
- Mike Colman, ice hockey player for the 1991–1992 San Jose Sharks
- Elisha S. Converse (1820–1904), inventor, manufacturer, philanthropist
- Sandro Corsaro, American animator and author, active from 2002
- Tom Dockrell, ice hockey player and coach for Colgate Raiders, 1950–1951
- Richard B. Fitzgibbon Jr. (1920–1956), among the first Americans killed in the Vietnam War
- Charles Gibbons (1901–1968), Speaker of the Massachusetts House of Representatives and 1958 candidate for governor
- Jonathan Goff, linebacker for the New York Giants, 2008–2011
- Josh Gondelman (born 1985), comedian, writer for HBO's Last Week Tonight with John Oliver
- George J. Hall (1921–1946), U.S. Army soldier and Medal of Honor recipient in World War II
- Nathaniel Hayward (1808–1865), inventor and manufacturer
- Chris J. Johnson (born 1977), actor
- Nancy Kerrigan, figure skating medalist at the 1992 and 1994 Olympic Games
- Killer Kowalski, professional wrestler active 1947–1993
- Jay Larson, comedian, actor
- Nancy Ludington, US Pairs Figure Skating Champion and Olympic Medalist (1960)
- John "Pie" McKenzie, National Hockey League player; member of the 1970 and 1972 Stanley Cup-winning Boston Bruins
- Joe McLaughlin, American football player 1979–1984, linebacker for the Green Bay Packers and New York Giants
- Matt Mira (born 1983), comedian and podcaster
- Mike Ness (born 1962), musician and founder of Social Distortion
- Carol Sloane (born 1937), jazz singer
- Buffy Sainte-Marie (born 1941), singer-songwriter, musician, and social activist
- Joe Vitiello, Major League Baseball player from 1995 to 2004
- Taylor von Kriegenbergh (born 1988), professional poker player
- Steve Yarbrough (born 1956), novelist and professor
- Nicholas Peters (born 1988), celebrity chef appeared on Hell’s Kitchen Season 14, Hell’s Kitchen All Stars and Food Network’s Chopped Sweets.

== Sports ==
In addition to the high school sports programs at Stoneham High School, Stoneham also has the Stoneham Sabers amateur team in the Yawkey Baseball League of Greater Boston.

== See also ==
- National Register of Historic Places listings in Stoneham, Massachusetts
- Stone Zoo
- People from Stoneham, Massachusetts
