= Williams House =

Williams House or Williams Farm may refer to:

== United States ==
=== Arkansas ===
- Arthur Williams Homestead, Feed Storage Shed, Bradford, in White County
- Maguire-Williams House, Elkins
- Williams-Wootton House, Hot Springs
- Dr. Robert George Williams House, Parkdale
- Williams House and Associated Farmstead, St. Paul
- Williams House (Searcy, Arkansas)
- Duckworth-Williams House, Siloam Springs

=== Arizona ===
- E. B. Williams House, Kingman
- Dan Williams House, Safford, listed on the NRHP in Arizona

=== California ===
- Roger Y. Williams House, San Juan Capistrano

=== Connecticut ===
- Austin F. Williams Carriagehouse and House, Farmington
- William Williams House (Lebanon, Connecticut), a National Historic Landmark and
- Eleazer Williams House, Mansfield Center
- Williams House (New Fairfield, Connecticut)
- Warham Williams House, Northford
- Williams and Stancliff Octagon Houses, Portland
- Buttolph–Williams House, Wethersfield

=== Delaware ===
- James Williams House (Kenton, Delaware)
- J. K. Williams House, Odessa
- Williams House (Odessa, Delaware)

=== Florida ===
- Williams House (Fort Lauderdale, Florida)
- John C. Williams House, St. Petersburg
- Williams House (Tallahassee, Florida)

=== Georgia ===
- Williams-Moore-Hillsman House, Roberta
- Williams Family Farm, Villa Rica

=== Illinois ===
- James Robert Williams House, Carmi
- Daniel Hale Williams House, Chicago
- Daniel Hale Williams House, Chicago
- Silas Williams House, Streator

=== Indiana ===
- Samuel P. Williams House, Howe
- Williams-Warren-Zimmerman House, Terre Haute

=== Iowa ===
- Potter–Williams House (Davenport, Iowa)

=== Kansas ===
- M. D. L. Williams Barn, Bendena, listed on the NRHP in Kansas

=== Kentucky ===
- Eustace Williams House, Anchorage, listed on the NRHP in Kentucky
- Smith–Williams House, Burgin, listed on the NRHP in Kentucky
- Williams House (Harrodsburg, Kentucky), listed on the NRHP in Kentucky
- Abraham L. Williams L & N Guest House, Lyndon, listed on the NRHP in Kentucky
- Merritt Williams House, Midway, listed on the NRHP in Kentucky
- Hubbard Williams House, Millersburg, listed on the NRHP in Kentucky
- Williams House (Red Bush, Kentucky), listed on the NRHP in Kentucky
- John Williams House (Shawhan, Kentucky), listed on the NRHP in Kentucky
- Thomas H. Williams House, Springfield, listed on the NRHP in Kentucky
- Daniel Motley Williams House, Summersville

=== Louisiana ===
- Williams House (Mansfield, Louisiana), listed on the NRHP in Louisiana
- Isaacs–Williams Mansion, New Orleans, listed on the NRHP in Louisiana

=== Maine ===
- Gen. John Williams House, Bangor
- John Williams House (Mount Vernon, Maine)
- Timothy and Jane Williams House, Rockland

=== Massachusetts ===
- Deane-Williams House, Cambridge
- Peabody-Williams House, Newton
- Charles Williams House, Somerville
- Charles Williams Jr. House, Somerville
- F. G. Williams House, Somerville
- Micah Williams House, Stoneham
- Williams–Linscott House, Stoneham
- Fairbanks-Williams House, Taunton
- Abiathar King Williams House, Taunton
- Enoch Williams House, Taunton
- Francis D. Williams House, Taunton
- N. S. Williams House, Taunton
- N. Williams House, Uxbridge

=== Michigan ===
- Williams-Cole House, Durand
- Alfred Williams House, Owosso
- Benjamin Williams House, Owosso

=== Minnesota ===
- C. E. Williams House, Mora, listed on the NRHP in Minnesota

=== Mississippi ===
- Ford–Williams House, Energy, listed on the NRHP in Mississippi
- Jim Williams House, Enterprise, listed on the NRHP in Mississippi
- Galloway-Williams House, Jackson, listed on the NRHP in Mississippi
- Alex Williams House, Jackson

=== Missouri ===
- C. C. Williams House, Clinton, listed on the NRHP in Henry County
- John Siddle Williams House, Hermitage
- Williams-Gierth House, Poplar Bluff

=== Montana ===
- Williams House (Stevensville, Montana)
- John and Ann Williams House, Stevensville

=== Nebraska ===
- Royer-Williams House, Lincoln
- Thomas and Mary Williams Homestead, Taylor

=== New Jersey ===
- Dr. Edward H. Williams House, Beach Haven
- Williams-Harrison House, Roseland
- William Carlos Williams House, Rutherford

=== New York ===
- John S. Williams House and Farm, Chatham
- Elisha Williams House, Hudson
- Henry Williams House (Huntington, New York)
- Potter–Williams House (Huntington, New York)
- Sherman Williams House and Fruit Barn, Jerusalem
- Dayton-Williams House, Middle Granville
- Williams–DuBois House, New Castle
- R. C. Williams Warehouse
- Johann Williams Farm, Niagara Falls
- Post-Williams House, Poughkeepsie
- Williams Farm (Rhinebeck, New York)
- Greenridge-Arthur Williams House, Roslyn Harbor
- Williams House (Vassar College), town of Poughkeepsie

=== North Carolina ===
- Robert Williams House, Eastover
- Smith-Williams-Durham Boarding House, Hendersonville
- Williams, Jr., Solomon and Kate, House, Inez, listed on the NRHP in North Carolina
- Humphrey–Williams House, Lumberton
- Isaac Williams House, Newton Grove
- Williams–Powell House, Orrum
- Olzie Whitehead Williams House, Wilson

=== North Dakota ===
- Towne–Williams House, Bismarck

=== Ohio ===
- Henry Harrison Williams House, Avon, listed on the NRHP in Ohio
- W. L. Williams House, Cincinnati
- Abner Williams Log House, Lashley
- Elias Williams House, Newark, listed on the NRHP in Ohio
- Dr. Issac Elmer Williams House and Office, St. Marys
- Judge Henry Williams House, Troy, listed on the NRHP in Ohio
- Williams House (Williamsburg, Ohio), listed on the NRHP in Ohio

=== Oregon ===
- C. S. Williams House, Eugene, listed on the NRHP in Oregon
- George H. Williams Townhouses, Portland
- Cox–Williams House, St. Helens
- Bennett–Williams House, The Dalles

=== Pennsylvania ===
- Ellis Williams House, East Goshen
- John Williams Farm, Phoenixville
- John Williams House (Williams Grove, Pennsylvania)

=== South Carolina ===
- Williams–Ligon House, Easley
- Williams–Earle House, Greenville, listed on the NRHP in South Carolina
- Williams Place, Glenn Springs
- Williams-Ball-Copeland House, Laurens
- Tom Williams House, Williams
- Williams House (Ulmer, South Carolina)

=== South Dakota ===
- John and Kittie Williams House, Webster

=== Tennessee ===
- Colonel John Williams House, Knoxville
- Fite-Williams-Ligon House, Carthage
- Jordan–Williams House, Nolensville

=== Texas ===
- W. T. and Clotilde V. Williams House, Austin, listed on the NRHP in Texas
- McCanless–Williams House, Ennis, listed on the NRHP in Texas
- Samuel May Williams House, Galveston
- Williams–Brueder House, Houston, listed on the NRHP in Texas
- Dial–Williamson House, Marshall, listed on the NRHP in Texas
- Williams–Tarbutton House, San Marcos, listed on the NRHP in Texas
- Williams–Anderson House, Tyler, listed on the NRHP in Texas
- B. F. Williams House, Victoria, listed on the NRHP in Texas
- Porter L. Williams House, Waxahachie, listed on the NRHP in Texas
- Williams–Erwin House, Waxahachie, listed on the NRHP in Texas

=== Utah ===
- Nathaniel J. Williams House, Park City, listed on the NRHP in Utah
- Reese Williams House, Park City

=== Virginia ===
- Williams House (Richlands, Virginia)
- Williams–Brown House and Store, Salem

=== Washington ===
- Hattie Williams House, Irondale, listed on the NRHP in Washington
- James and Corinne Williams House, Spokane, listed on the NRHP in Washington
- Sidney Williams House, Sumner, listed on the NRHP in Washington
- Herbert Williams House, Sumner, listed on the NRHP in Washington

=== Wisconsin ===
- Lewis-Williams House, Hudson
- William G. and Anne Williams House, Sparta
- Frank J. Williams House, Whitefish Bay, listed on the NRHP in Wisconsin

== Australia ==
=== Queensland ===
- Williams' House, Yungaburra, Yungaburra, listed on the Queensland Heritage Register

== See also ==
- Henry Williams House (disambiguation)
- James Williams House (disambiguation)
- William Williams House (disambiguation)
- McWilliams House (disambiguation)
- Potter-Williams House (disambiguation)
