= John Williams House =

John Williams House may refer to:

- John C. Williams House, St. Petersburg, Florida, listed on the NRHP in Florida
- John Williams House (Shawhan, Kentucky), listed on the NRHP in Harrison County, Kentucky
- John Williams House (Mount Vernon, Maine), listed on the NRHP in Kennebec County, Maine
- John Siddle Williams House, Hermitage, Missouri, listed on the NRHP in Hickory County, Missouri
- John and Ann Williams House, Stevensville, Montana, listed on the NRHP in Ravalli County, Montana
- John S. Williams House and Farm, Chatham, New York, listed on the NRHP in New York
- John Williams Farm, Phoenixville, Pennsylvania, listed on the NRHP in Eastern Chester County, Pennsylvania
- John Williams House (Williams Grove, Pennsylvania), listed on the NRHP in Cumberland County, Pennsylvania
- John and Kittie Williams House, Webster, South Dakota, listed on the NRHP in Day County, South Dakota
- John Williams House (Savannah, Georgia), built in 1849

== See also ==
- Williams House (disambiguation)
