= Potter House =

Potter House may refer to:

in the United States

(by state then city)

- Potter Section House, Anchorage, Alaska, listed on the National Register of Historic Places (NRHP)
- Dell Ranch House, Clifton, Arizona, listed on the NRHP in Arizona
- Potter House (St. Petersburg, Florida), listed on the NRHP
- Potter House (Rock Island, Illinois), listed on the NRHP
- William Potter House, Lafayette, Indiana, listed on the NRHP
- Potter-Williams House (Davenport, Iowa), NRHP-listed
- Potter Hall, Williston, Maryland, listed on the NRHP
- Potter Estate, Newton, Massachusetts, listed on the NRHP
- Potter-O'Brian House, Waltham, Massachusetts, listed on the NRHP
- Potter-Van Camp House, Bath, New York, listed on the NRHP
- Ephraim B. Potter House, Glens Falls, New York, listed on the NRHP
- Potter-Williams House (Huntington, New York), listed on the NRHP
- Arnold Potter House, Potter, New York, listed on the NRHP
- Judge Joseph Potter House, Whitehall, New York, listed on the NRHP
- Wallace and Glenn Potter House, Eugene, Oregon, listed on the NRHP
- Miles B. and Eleanor Potter House, Hood River, Oregon, listed on the NRHP in Oregon
- Potter-Allison Farm, Centre Hall, Pennsylvania, listed on the NRHP
- Potter-Remington House, Cranston, Rhode Island, listed on the NRHP
- Potter-Collyer House, Pawtucket, Rhode Island, listed on the NRHP
- The Potter's House Church, Dallas, Texas
- H. W. Potter House, Yakima, Washington, listed on the NRHP

== See also ==
- Potter-Williams House (disambiguation)
