= Potter–Williams House =

Potter-Williams House may refer to:

- Potter–Williams House (Davenport, Iowa)
- Potter–Williams House (Huntington, New York)

== See also ==
- Potter House (disambiguation)
- Williams House (disambiguation)
