= William Williams House =

William Williams House

in the United States

(by state)

- William Williams House (Lebanon, Connecticut), a National Historic Landmark and NRHP-listed
- William Carlos Williams House, Rutherford, New Jersey, NRHP-listed
- William G. and Anne Williams House, Sparta, Wisconsin, NRHP-listed

== See also ==
- Williams House (disambiguation)
