= James Williams House =

James Williams House may refer to:

- James Williams House (Kenton, Delaware), listed on the NRHP in Delaware
- James Robert Williams House, Carmi, Illinois, NRHP-listed
- Jim Williams House, Enterprise, Mississippi, listed on the NRHP in Clarke County, Mississippi
- James and Corinne Williams House, Spokane, Washington, listed on the NRHP in Spokane County, Washington

== See also ==
- Williams House (disambiguation)
