= Henry Williams House =

Henry Williams House may refer to:

- Henry Williams House (Huntington, New York), listed on the National Register of Historic Places (NRHP)
- Henry Harrison Williams House, Avon, Ohio, listed on the NRHP in Lorain County, Ohio

== See also ==
- Williams House (disambiguation)
