= Micah Williams House =

Historic house in Massachusetts, United States

- U.S. National Register of Historic Places
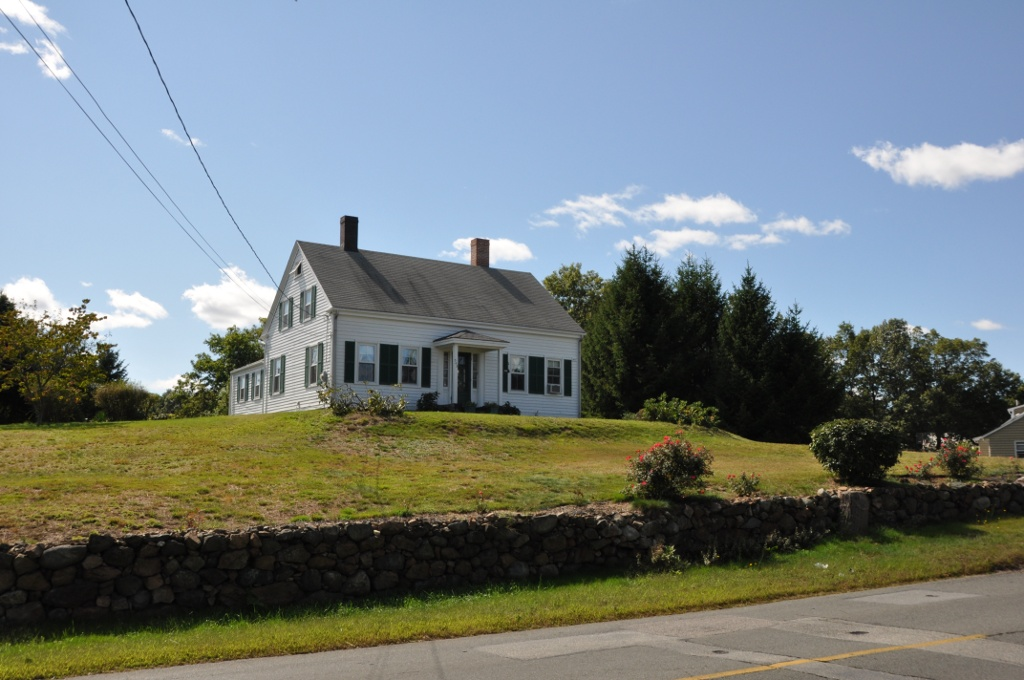

- Location within Massachusetts Location within the United States
- Location: 342 William St., Stoneham, Massachusetts
- Coordinates: 42°29′19″N 71°6′27″W
- Built: 1830
- Architectural style: Greek Revival
- MPS: Stoneham MRA
- NRHP reference No.: 84002851
- Added to NRHP: April 13, 1984

The Micah Williams House is a historic house at 342 William Street in Stoneham, Massachusetts. The 1 1/2-story Greek Revival cottage was built c. 1830 by Micah Williams. Unlike many Greek Revival buildings, which have the gable end facing the street, this one has the front on the roof side, a more traditional colonial orientation. Its facade is five bays wide, with a center entrance sheltered by a hip-roof portico with square columns. The house was built by Williams (who lived across the street) for his daughter.

The house was listed on the National Register of Historic Places in 1984.

== See also ==
- Williams-Linscott House, also owned by Micah Williams
- National Register of Historic Places listings in Stoneham, Massachusetts
- National Register of Historic Places listings in Middlesex County, Massachusetts
