= McWilliams House =

McWilliams House may refer to:

== United States ==
(by state)

- J.H. McWilliams House, listed on the National Register of Historic Places (NRHP)
- McWilliams House (Lincoln, Nebraska), listed on the NRHP in Lancaster County
- Matthew McWilliams House, Cincinnati, Ohio, listed on the NRHP in Hamilton County
- Evarts-McWilliams House, Georgia, Vermont, listed on the NRHP in Franklin County

== See also ==
- Williams House (disambiguation)
