= J. Shallcross House =

Historic house in Delaware, United States

- U.S. National Register of Historic Places
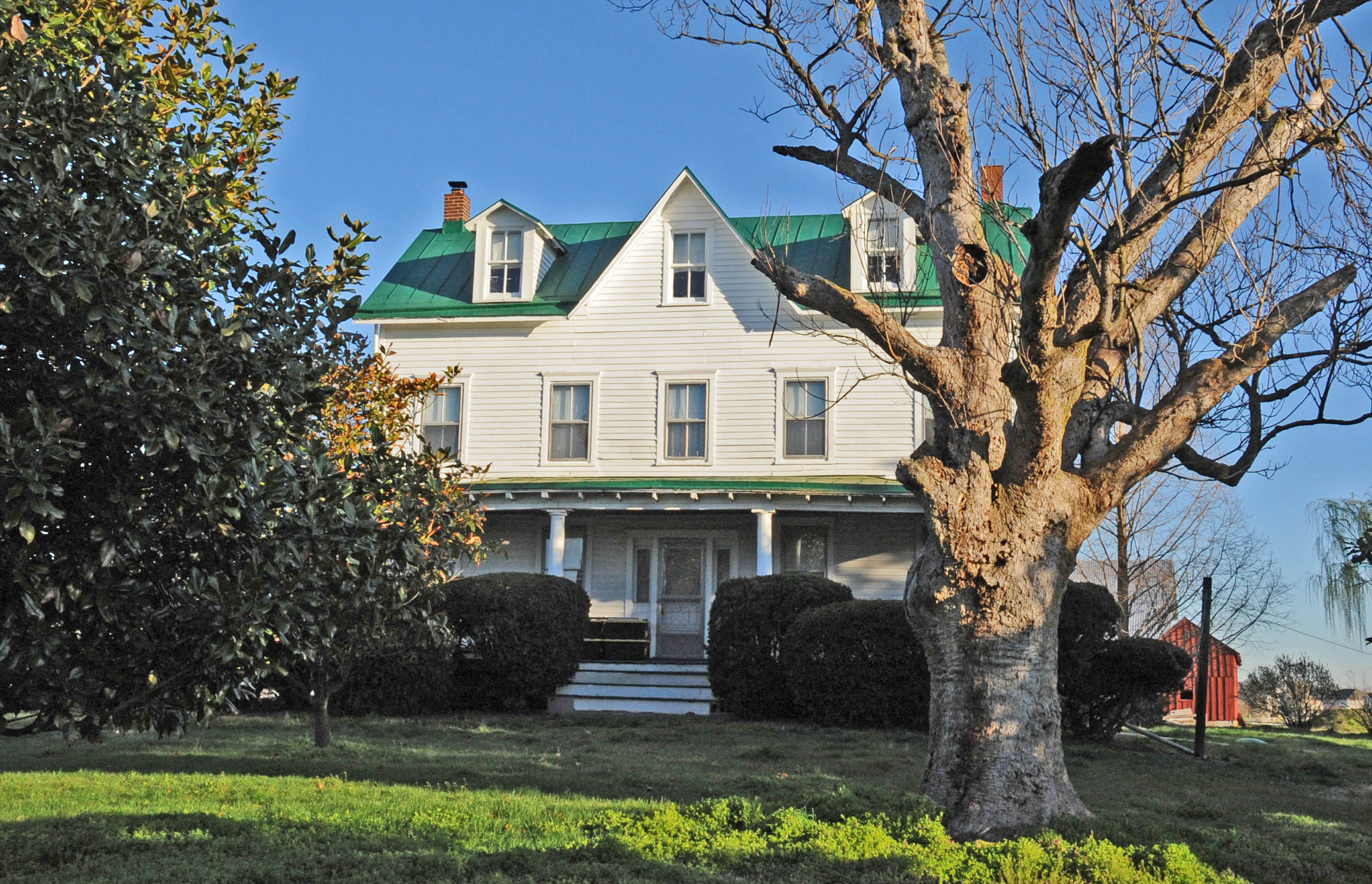

- Location within Delaware Location within the United States
- Location: 557 Middletown-Odessa Road, Middletown, Delaware
- Coordinates: 39.452428°N 75.692289°W
- Area: 7 acres (2.8 ha)
- Built: c. 1885
- Architectural style: Late Victorian, Greek Revival, Federal
- MPS: Rebuilding St. Georges Hundred 1850--1880 TR
- NRHP reference No.: 85002115
- Added to NRHP: September 13, 1985

The J. Shallcross House is a historic home located at Middletown, New Castle County, Delaware. It was built about 1885, and is a 2 1/2-story, five-bay, frame house constructed in a vernacular Victorian style. It has a three bay by two bay rear wing. The house features a three bay, wood porch on the front facade and a gable roof with dormers.

It was listed on the National Register of Historic Places in 1985. The initial nomination confused it with the A. M. Vail House and referred to it as the "J. K. Williams House"; the historical information there may not apply to this building.
