= Charles Williams House =

Historic house in Massachusetts, United States

- U.S. National Register of Historic Places
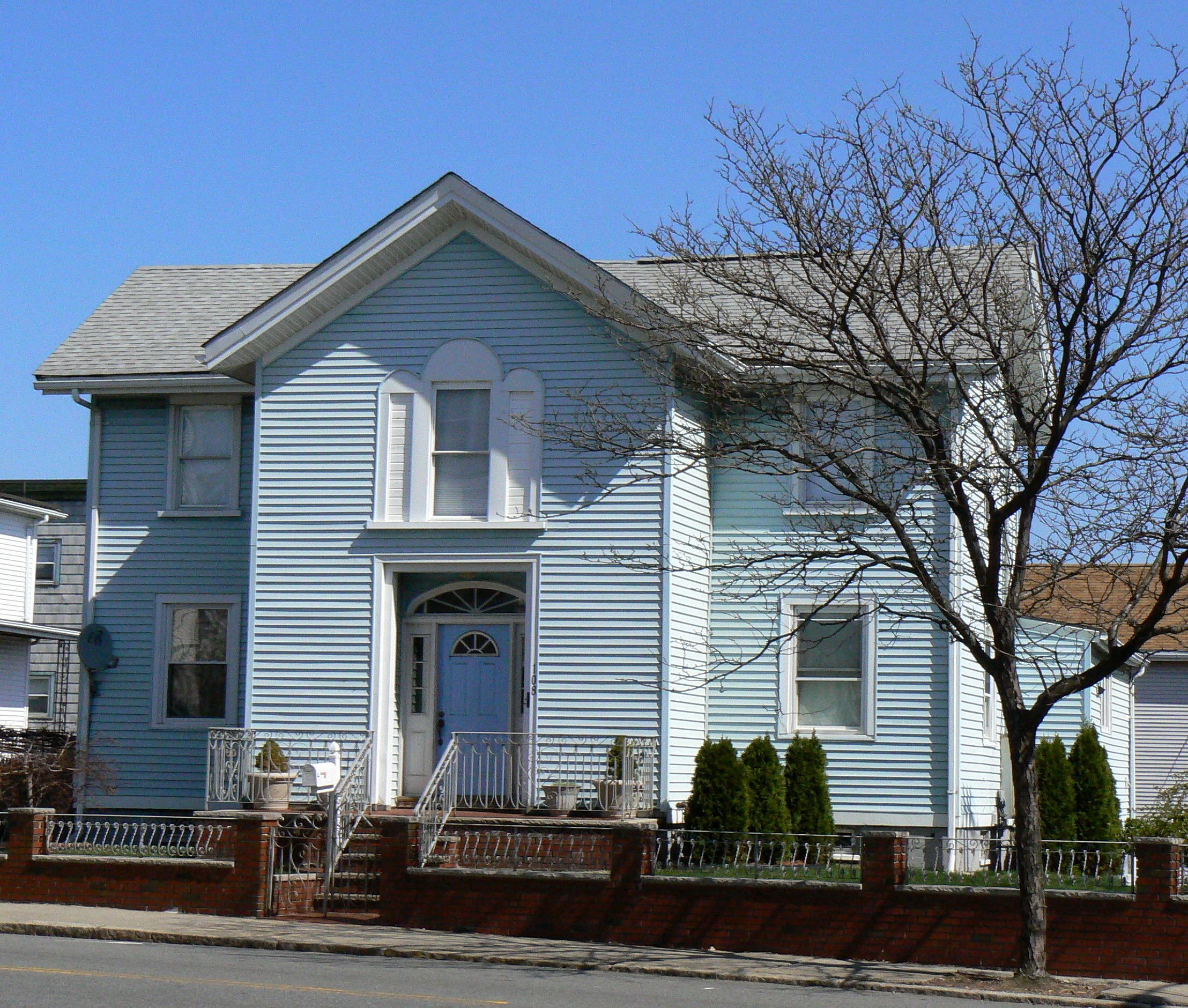

- Location within Massachusetts Location within the United States
- Location: 108 Cross Street, Somerville, Massachusetts
- Coordinates: 42°23′3″N 71°5′22″W
- Built: 1848
- Architectural style: Italianate
- MPS: Somerville MPS
- NRHP reference No.: 89001253
- Added to NRHP: September 18, 1989

The Charles Williams House is a historic house in Somerville, Massachusetts. The 2 1/2-story wood frame Italianate house was built c. 1848 for Charles Williams, a hat dealer. The central projecting section has a Palladian window on the second floor, above a recessed entranceway where the door is surrounded by sidelight and transom windows. It is one of a small number of surviving Italianate homes in the city, and is one of the oldest of that style.

The house was listed on the National Register of Historic Places in 1989.

== See also ==
- Charles Williams, Jr., House, his son's house
- National Register of Historic Places listings in Somerville, Massachusetts
