= Adventure Park USA =

Amusement park in Monrovia, Maryland, US

- Previously known as Frederick Putt-Putt Golf and Games
- Interactive map of Adventure Park USA
- Location: Monrovia, Maryland, United States
- Coordinates: 39.379388°N 77.278179°W
- Status: Operating
- Opened: 2005
- Owner: AP Land, LLC
- Slogan: Adventure Park USA: Where the adventure begins!
- Operating season: March through October

Attractions
- Total: 20
- Roller coasters: 3

Adventure Park USA is a family entertainment center in Monrovia, Maryland, east of Frederick, Maryland, situated on 17.5 acres, which opened in 2005.

== Roller coasters ==
Name	Opened	Manufacturer	Model	Comments
Wildcat	2007	Schwarzkopf	Wildcat	Adventure Park USA's first roller coaster, formerly operated at Busch Gardens Williamsburg, Playland Park, Steel Pier, and Williams Grove Amusement Park
Tumbleweed	2015	Miler Manufacturing	Unknown	Formerly operated at Jolly Roger Amusement Park
Wild West Express	2015	SDC	Windstorm	Formerly operated at Old Town

== Other attractions ==
- Outdoor attractions: Skycoaster, Road Runner, Blazing Trail Go-Karts, 2 Championship Miniature Golf Courses, Gemstone Mining Co., Rattlesnake, Carousel, Sky Race, Super Slide
- Indoor attractions: Cafe' Duck Pin Bowling, West World Laser Tag, Rustler's Ridge Rock Wall, Zip and Hang 'Em High Ropes Course, Frog Hopper, Spin Zone Bumper Cars, Gold Rush Soft Playground, Stampede Arcade
