= Williams Grove Amusement Park =

Former amusement park in Mechanicsburg, Pennsylvania

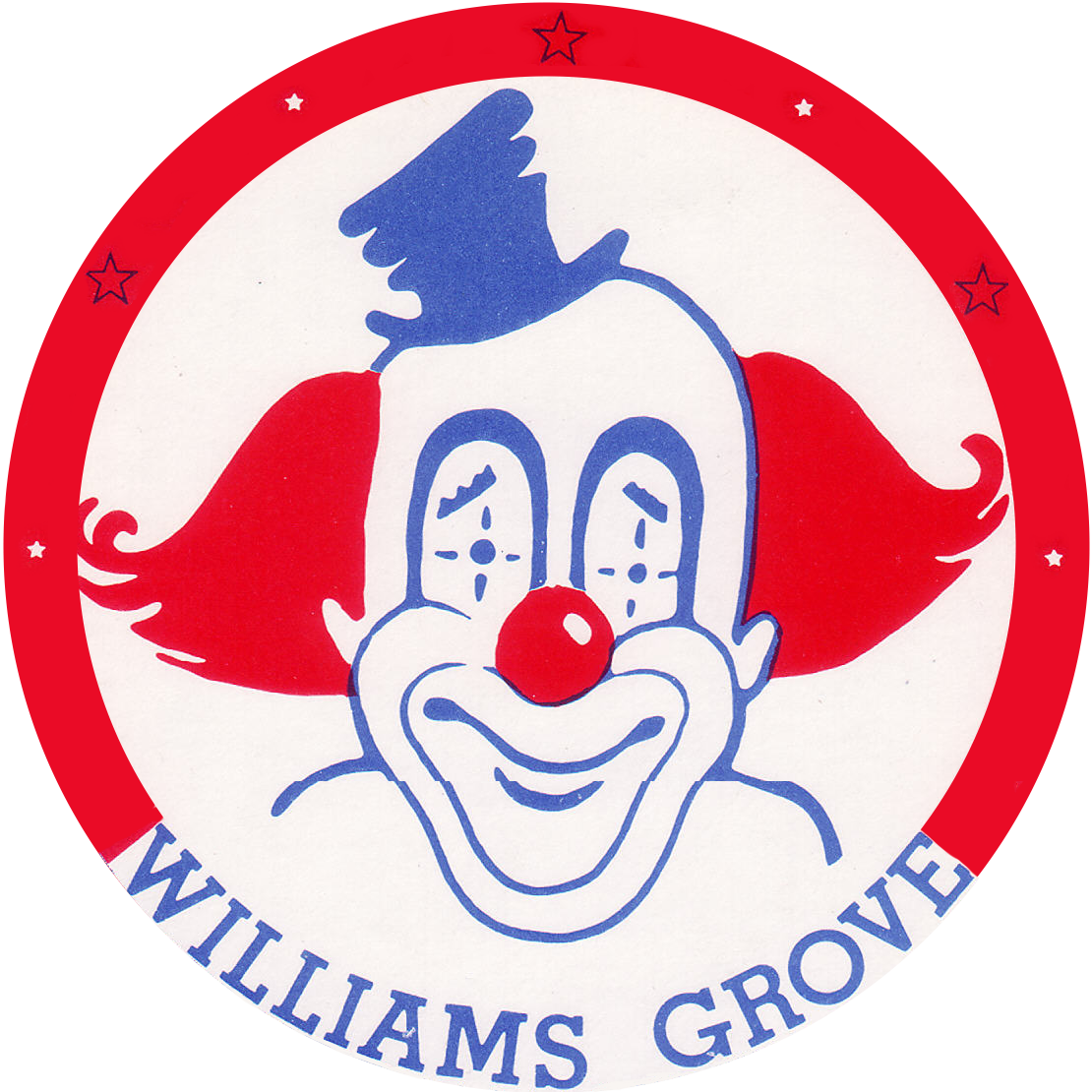
- Interactive map of Williams Grove Amusement Park
- Location: Williams Grove, Pennsylvania
- Coordinates: 40°9′5″N 77°2′3″W
- Status: Defunct
- Opened: 1850; 176 years ago
- Closed: September 5, 2005; 21 years ago
- Owner: Williams family (1850-1918) Charles Markley (1918-1924) Richwine family (1924-1972) Hughes family (1972-present)
- Slogan: "Hosting picnics since 1850!"

Attractions
- Total: 27
- Roller coasters: 3
- Water rides: 3
- Other rides: 21

Williams Grove Amusement Park is an abandoned amusement park in Williams Grove, Pennsylvania. The park operated from 1850 until 2005.

== History ==
The Williams family began hosting picnics in 1850 at a small grove near Mechanicsburg, Pennsylvania. Within a few years, the grove was developed into a park. In 1873, the Cumberland Valley Railroad, which operated the newly constructed Dillsburg and Mechanicsburg Railroad, leased the grove from the Williams family, planning to build it into a resort destination. Williams Grove's positioning along the railroad made it a promising location for travel. That summer, a small gathering of local chapters of the Pennsylvania State Grange was held at the grove. Within the coming years, the gathering would become a farmer's fair known as the Great Grangers’ Picnic Exhibition, which brought in upwards of 100,000 guests from more than 30 states over its week-long stay. The exhibition's popularity brought success to Williams Grove. The picnic was held for the last time in 1916. In 1918, Charles Markley bought the park, attempting to resurrect the picnic, but was unsuccessful. In 1924, Roy Richwine purchased the park, installing the first permanent rides. Richwine was very influential in the park's development, adding popular rides like Zipper and Laff in the Dark. In 1937, Emmett Shelle convinced him to construct Williams Grove Speedway, a half-mile sprint car racing track, next to the park. The speedway opened in 1938 and became very successful. In 1958, the Williams Grove Historical Steam Engine Association would be formed, utilizing land adjacent to the park for the hosting of annual steam engine shows among other uses. In the 1960s, the park was a popular country music venue.

An entrepreneur named Morgan Hughes purchased the park from the Richwine family in 1972 for US$1.2 million (equivalent to $9.24 million in 2025). Hughes relocated several rides to Williams Grove from multiple locations, including the defunct New Jersey Palisades Amusement Park, which closed in 1971. Hughes had not prepared for high water levels, and in June 1972, shortly after its refurbishment, Williams Grove Amusement Park was nearly destroyed due to Hurricane Agnes and subsequent flooding from nearby Yellow Breeches Creek. Ownership attempted to rebuild what was lost, and the park operated through the end of the 2005 season when the Hughes family decided to focus their attention on the Williams Grove Speedway instead. Hughes, who was in his mid-80s at the time of the park's closure, attempted to sell the property in 2006 to a prospective owner who would keep the park intact and operational. Hughes cited Hershey Entertainment & Resorts and Cedar Fair as potential buyers who could help renew the park.

On January 19, 2007, the nonprofit Williams Grove Historical Steam Engine Association purchased the southern 90 acres attached to the park, which they had utilized since the 1950s, for $2.25 million. Today, the organization hosts fairs and many offerings year-round. During 2006 and the coming years, several rides were auctioned off from main portion of park. Hughes died on April 12, 2008, at the age of 88. His daughter, Kathy Hughes, became the owner of the former park as well as the current speedway.

In 2016, after being closed for just over a decade, Williams Grove Amusement Park reopened for Halloween night. This event, called "Terror in the Park", took guests on a guided walk through the dimly lit grounds, passing various scare actors. The event was organized by Halloween Park, who charged $45 per visitor. As of 2026, The Williams Grove Historical Steam Engine Association is raising money to restore the old carousel building after moving it from the park to their adjacent grounds.

== Former attractions ==
Cyclone was a 1933 wooden roller coaster which served as the main attraction of the park. Cyclone rose to a height of 65 feet and traveled at a top speed of 45 mph. The ride was designed by Oscar Bitler and originally opened as Zipper. The name was changed when the park received trains from the former Palisades Park's coaster of the name Cyclone. Cyclone was well-known for the several issues that plagued its operation, including being damaged by fire in late 1995, and the station and a portion of track collapsing under the weight of snow early the next year, the latter of which resulted in $500,000 in repairs. A portion of the coaster also had to be replaced when a truck was driven through it. It remains standing at the park to this day, with the train still parked at the loading station.

In 2001, the park opened Wildcat, a Schwarzkopf Wildcat that previously operated at Steel Pier in Atlantic City, New Jersey. Upon the park's closing, Wildcat was relocated to Adventure Park USA in New Market, Maryland.

Two smaller coasters also operated at the park. One of these coasters was Kiddie Coaster, which operated from 1992 until the park's closure. It had previously operated at Fantasy Farm Amusement Park in Monroe, Ohio. Another coaster was Little Dipper, which operated from 1950 until 1963.

The park featured a Pretzel dark ride that opened in 1942, called Laff in the Dark. The ride was converted into a new dark ride called Dante's Inferno in 1985. Dante's Inferno underwent a complete refurbishment during the park's final year of operation. The ride building is still standing today. The park also used to have a walk-through funhouse called Allotria.

In the early 1980s, the park opened one of the first water slides in the area. The slide's platform is still standing, although the slides themselves have since been removed.

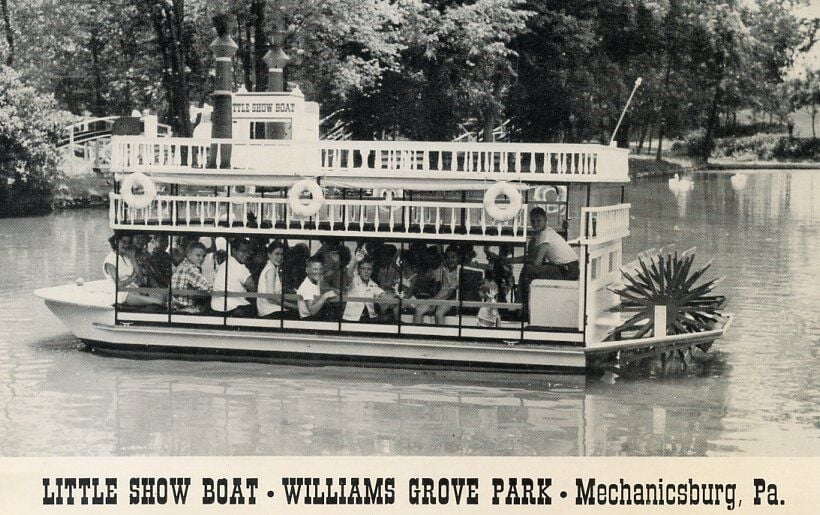
The park's lake was the location for many boat rides over its history.

=== Kiddie rides ===
- Maze - A four-story kiddie maze
- Helicopter
- Dream
- Kiddie Whip - Miniature Whip ride
- Mini Tea Cups - Miniature Teacups ride
- Convoy
- Antique Cars
- Motorcycles
- Kiddie Coaster - Roller coaster

=== Family rides ===
- Dante's Inferno - Pretzel dark ride
- Merry-Go-Round - Menagerie carousel
- Allotria - Walkthrough funhouse
- Train Ride - Chance Rides C.P. Huntington Miniature Train

=== Adult rides ===
- Super Disco Star - Music Express
- Sprint Car Go Karts
- Bumper Cars
- Wildcat - Schwarzkopf Wildcat roller coaster
- Twister - Chance Rides Twister
- Airborne - Paratrooper
- German Chair Swing - Swing ride
- Monster
- Musik Express
- Tilt-A-Whirl
- Cyclone - 1933 wooden Oscar Bitler roller coaster

=== Water rides ===
- Waterslides
- Pontoon river boat
- Paddleboats

=== Other attractions ===
- Lazer tag arena - A laser tag game located in a former chapel
- Miniature golf
- Space arcade
- Theater
