= Williams Grove, Pennsylvania =

Unincorporated community in Pennsylvania, US

- Unincorporated community
- Location within Pennsylvania Location within the United States
- Country: United States
- State: Pennsylvania
- County: Cumberland
- Elevation: 423 ft (129 m)
- Time zone: UTC-5 (Eastern (EST))
  - Summer (DST): UTC-4 (EDT)
- Area codes: 717 & 223
- GNIS feature ID: 1191460

Williams Grove is an unincorporated community in Monroe Township, Cumberland County, Pennsylvania, United States. Williams Grove is located off U.S. Route 15 and is home to the Williams Grove Speedway and defunct Williams Grove Amusement Park.

== History ==
The Williams family settled and built the John Williams House, which was added to the National Register of Historic Places in 1977. In 1850, they began hosting picnics on their property, in a grove next to the Yellow Breeches Creek. This grove would later become Williams Grove Amusement Park.

In 1928, the grove was sold to Roy Richwine, who developed it into a full amusement park and opened Williams Grove Speedway in 1939.

In 1963, Ashcombe Farm & Greenhouses opened on the eastern end of the village. On May 22, 1989, two men who lived at the Williams Grove Mobile Home Park tossed illegal fireworks onto the roof of Ashcombe's. The fireworks caused a large fire, causing an estimated $500,000 in damage and destroying almost the entire complex. A makeshift market was erected in the parking lot, while a new building was being constructed. The new Ashcombe Farm & Greenhouses opened in 1990.

Williams Grove Amusement Park closed following the 2005 season.

In 2007, Williams Grove Historical Steam Engine Association purchased a 90-acre plot of land that they had previously been using for festivals.

T.J. Rockwell's replaced the former Countryside Inn in 2008.
