= Williams House (Searcy, Arkansas) =

Historic house in Arkansas, United States

- U.S. National Register of Historic Places
- Location within Arkansas Location within the United States
- Nearest city: Searcy, Arkansas
- Coordinates: 35°13′44″N 91°45′0″W
- Area: less than one acre
- Built: 1910
- Architectural style: Vernacular cross-shaped
- MPS: White County MPS
- NRHP reference No.: 91001353
- Added to NRHP: July 23, 1992

The Williams House was a historic house about 0.25 miles (0.40 km) north of Arkansas Highway 267 on County Road 54, southwest of Searcy, Arkansas. It was a single story cross-gabled wood-frame structure, clad in a combination of weatherboard and asbestos shingling, with a foundation of brick piers. Its eastern gable end was notable for its particularly ornate decoration. It was built about 1910.

The house was listed on the National Register of Historic Places in 1992. It has been listed as destroyed in the Arkansas Historic Preservation Program database.

== See also ==
- National Register of Historic Places listings in White County, Arkansas
