= Thomas and Mary Williams Homestead =

Historic house in Nebraska, United States

- U.S. National Register of Historic Places
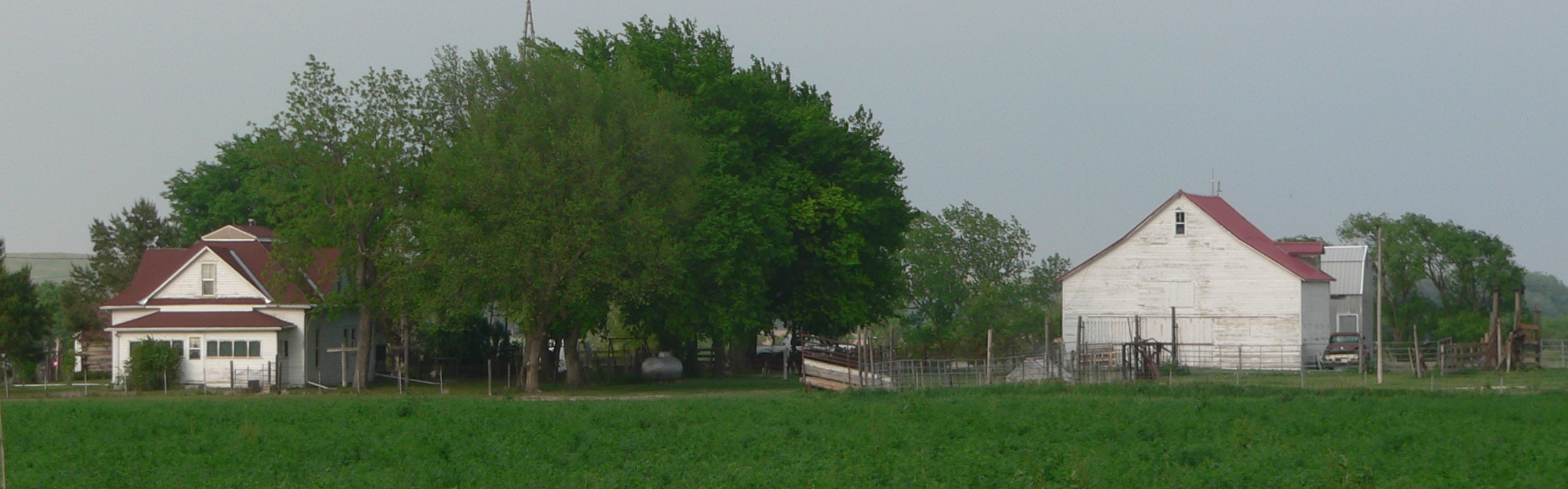
- Williams homestead, seen from the southwest

- Location within Nebraska Location within the United States
- Location: 0.5 miles east of Taylor, off a gravel road
- Nearest city: Taylor, Nebraska
- Coordinates: 41°45′53″N 99°22′22″W
- Area: 80 acres (32 ha)
- Built: 1884
- Built by: Williams, Thomas
- NRHP reference No.: 98001565
- Added to NRHP: December 31, 1998

The Thomas and Mary Williams Homestead, near Taylor, Nebraska, has significance dating to 1884. Its 80-acre (32 ha) property was listed on the National Register of Historic Places in 1998 with seven contributing buildings and three other contributing structures.

Thomas Williams was an American Civil War veteran. The property, which includes a log house, is located approximately 0.5 miles east of Taylor.
