= William Potter House =

Historic house in Indiana, United States

- U.S. National Register of Historic Places
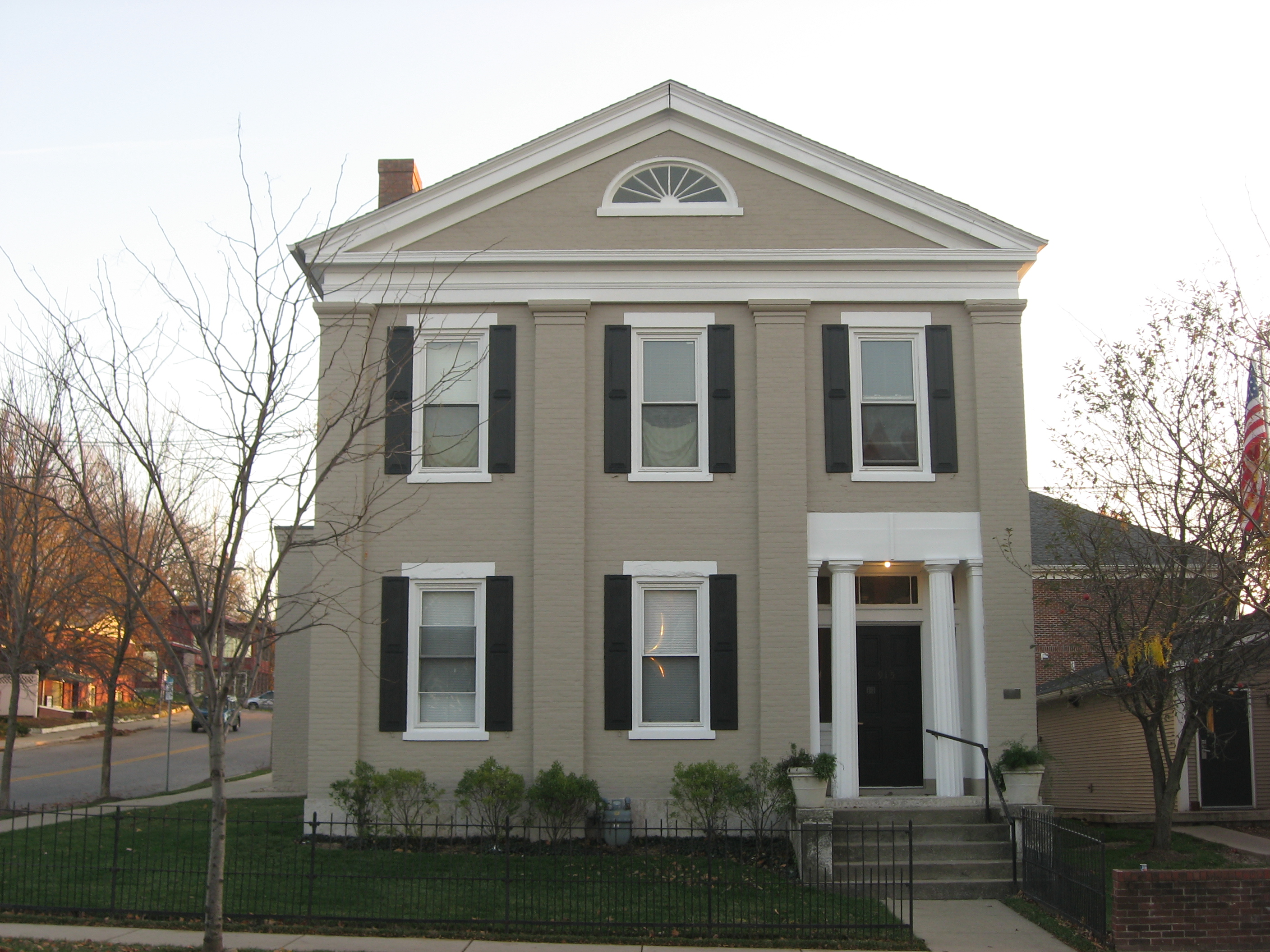
- William Potter House, November 2009

- Location within Tippecanoe County, Indiana Location within Indiana Location within the United States
- Location: 915 Columbia St., Lafayette, Indiana
- Coordinates: 40°25′5″N 86°53′8″W
- Area: 0.4 acres (0.16 ha)
- Built: 1855
- Architectural style: Greek Revival
- NRHP reference No.: 83000104
- Added to NRHP: January 6, 1983

William Potter House, also known as the Potter House, is a historic home located at Lafayette, Indiana. It was built in 1855, and is a two-story, Greek Revival style brick dwelling, with a front gable roof. A rear addition was added about 1880. The entrance features Doric order columns and opposing pilasters.

It was listed on the National Register of Historic Places in 1983.
