= Francis D. Williams House =

Historic house in Massachusetts, United States

- U.S. National Register of Historic Places
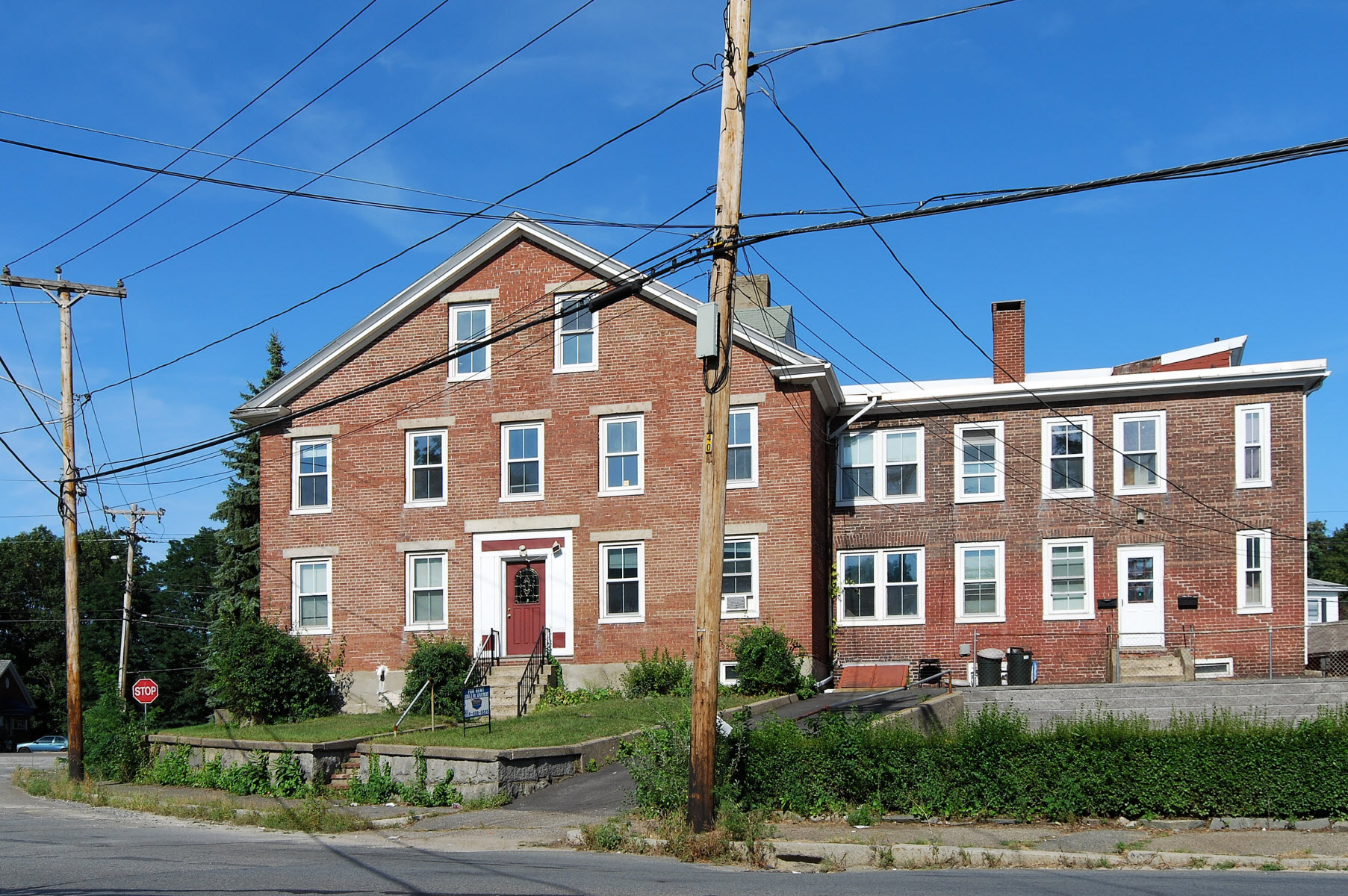

- Location within Massachusetts Location within the United States
- Location: 3 Plain St., Taunton, Massachusetts
- Coordinates: 41°53′7″N 71°5′21″W
- Built: c. 1830
- Architectural style: Greek Revival
- MPS: Taunton MRA
- NRHP reference No.: 84002282
- Added to NRHP: July 5, 1984

The Francis D. Williams House is a historic brick house located at 3 Plain Street in Taunton, Massachusetts. Built in about 1830, it is a prominent and rare example of Federal period architecture in the city's Weir Village neighborhood.

== Description and history ==
The Francis D. Williams House is prominently sited, standing just beyond the eastern end of Taunton's Plain Street Bridge across the Taunton River, on a triangular parcel bounded by Plain, Water, and Berkley Streets. It is a large 2 1/2-story brick building, with a side-gable roof pierced by two gabled dormers and a central brick chimney stack. The facade facing toward the bridge is eight bays wide, evenly spaced and all filled with sash windows that have granite sills and lintels. The entrances are on the side facades, facing toward Berkley and Plain Streets; these are five bays wide, with the entrances at the centers, framed by paneled surrounds. A five-bay two-story brick ell extends to the main block's rear.

The house was built circa 1830, when the Weir Village area where it stands was a thriving seaport and industrial area. It is one of Taunton's only brick Greek Revival houses, was probably built by Francis Williams, member of a prominent local family involved in sea trade. Its size suggest that it may have been used by the Williams family to board sailors involved in the coasting trade.

It was listed on the National Register of Historic Places on July 5, 1984.

== See also ==
- National Register of Historic Places listings in Taunton, Massachusetts
