= A. M. Vail House =

Historic house in Delaware, United States

- U.S. National Register of Historic Places
- Location within Delaware Location within the United States
- Location: 521 Middletown-Odessa Road, Middletown, Delaware
- Coordinates: 39.451819°N 75.695872°W
- Area: 5 acres (2.0 ha)
- Architectural style: Late Victorian, Greek Revival, Federal
- MPS: Rebuilding St. Georges Hundred 1850-1880 TR
- NRHP reference No.: 85002117
- Added to NRHP: September 13, 1985

A. M. Vail House was a historic home located at Middletown, New Castle County, Delaware. It is a two-story, five-bay timber frame dwelling in the late-Federal style. It was built on a center-hall passage plan. Also on the property were a smoke house, a drive-through crib barn and granary, and a large frame cow barn.

It was listed on the National Register of Historic Places in 1985. It was demolished between 2007 and 2009.
