= Arthur Williams Homestead, Feed Storage Shed =

- U.S. National Register of Historic Places
- Location within Arkansas Location within the United States
- Nearest city: Bradford, Arkansas
- Coordinates: 35°25′15″N 91°27′50″W
- Area: less than one acre
- Architectural style: Box construction
- MPS: White County MPS
- NRHP reference No.: 91001321
- Added to NRHP: July 23, 1992

The Arthur Williams Homestead, Feed storage Shed is a historic farm outbuilding on Farwell Road, located at the outskirts of Bradford, Arkansas. It is a 1 1/2-story structure, with a gable-roofed box frame structure at its center, flanked by frame shed-roof sections. The central portion was built c. 1915 as a residence. 15 years later (about 1930), it was converted to a feed shed for various farm animals. It is known for its distinct box frame style constructed in the central section, which is uncommon in the White County.

The building was listed on the National Register of Historic Places in 1992.

== See also ==
- National Register of Historic Places listings in White County, Arkansas
