= Warham Williams House =

- U.S. National Register of Historic Places
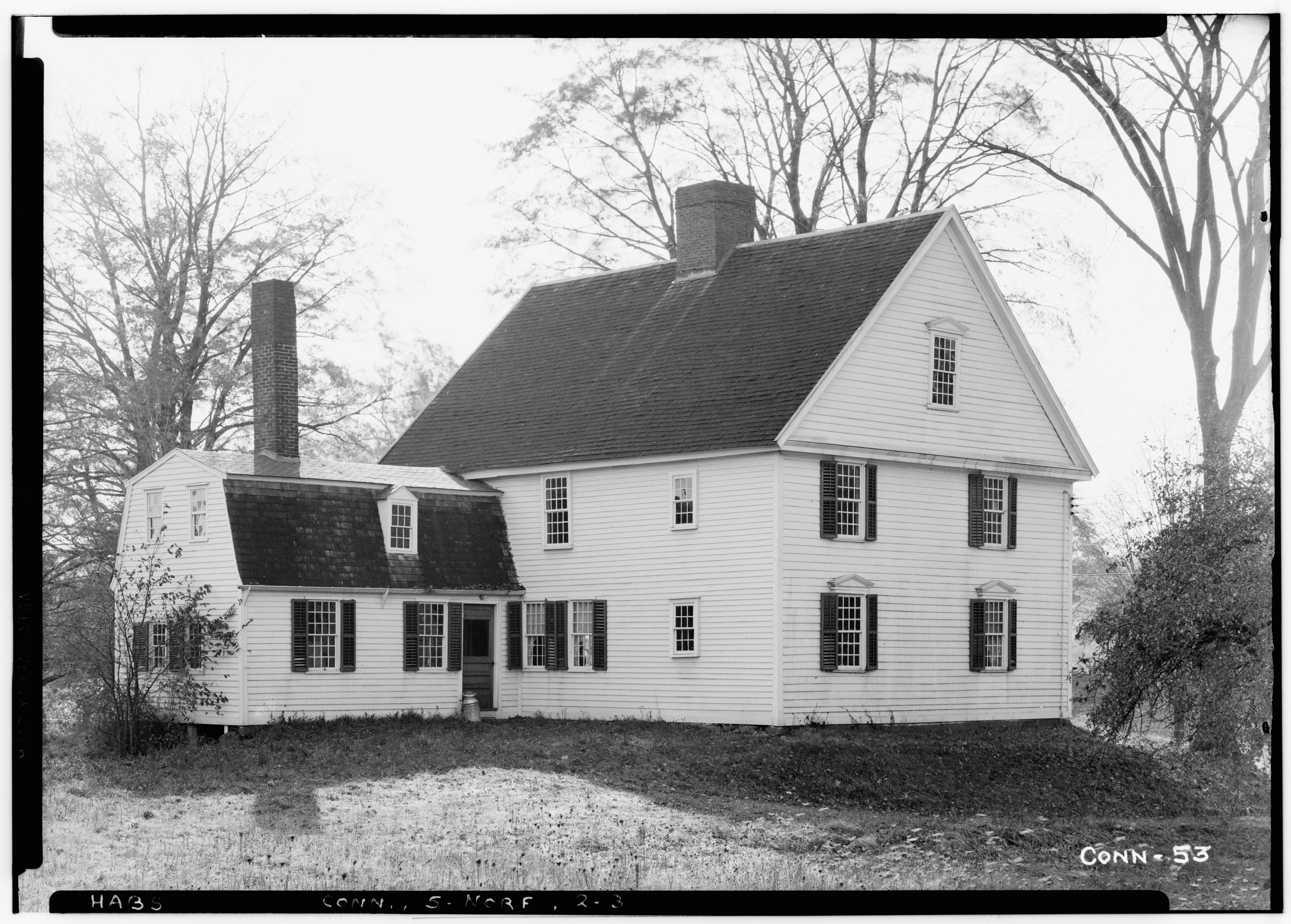
- HABS photo, 1937, of the house at its original location in Northford

- Location within Connecticut Location within the United States
- Location: Formerly Old Post Road and CT Routes 17 and 22, Northford, Connecticut; now Roxbury, Connecticut
- Coordinates: 41°23′33″N 72°47′31″W (old location)
- Area: 2 acres (0.81 ha)
- Built: 1752
- NRHP reference No.: 71000915
- Added to NRHP: March 11, 1971

The Warham Williams House is a historic house in Roxbury, Connecticut. Originally built in 1752 in Northford, Connecticut for the Reverend Warham Williams, Northford's first settled minister, it is architecturally significant for its elaborate front door surround. It was moved to a rural setting in Roxbury in 1978. It was listed on the National Register of Historic Places in 1971.

== Description and history ==
The Warham Williams House originally occupied a prominent setting in the village of Northford, standing just south of the Northford Congregational Church. It is a 2 1/2-story wood-frame structure, with a gabled roof and clapboarded exterior. Its main facade is five bays wide, windows placed symmetrically around the center entrance. The entrance consists of narrow double doors, flanked by pilasters which rise to support an elaborate entablature crowned by a broken scrolled pediment. The interior originally followed a typical center chimney plan, with parlor spaces on either side of the chimney and long kitchen behind. The entry vestibule also included a narrow winding stair leading to the upstairs chambers. In one of the upstairs closets is a graffiti-like collection of writing which apparently identifies all of the painters who painted the house. The "best" parlor also features free-hand drawings on the walls which have been attributed to a regional artist, Jared Jessup, and date to the early 19th century.

Reverend Warham Williams was appointed minister of the Northford Congregational Church in 1750, and not long afterward had this house built. It was then also the home of his successor, William Noyes, before serving for many years as a church rectory for the local Episcopal church. It was deconstructed (in a process documented by the local historical society), and moved to Roxbury, Connecticut in 1978, where it forms part of a house composed of several older buildings.
