= F. G. Williams House =

Historic house in Massachusetts, United States

- U.S. National Register of Historic Places
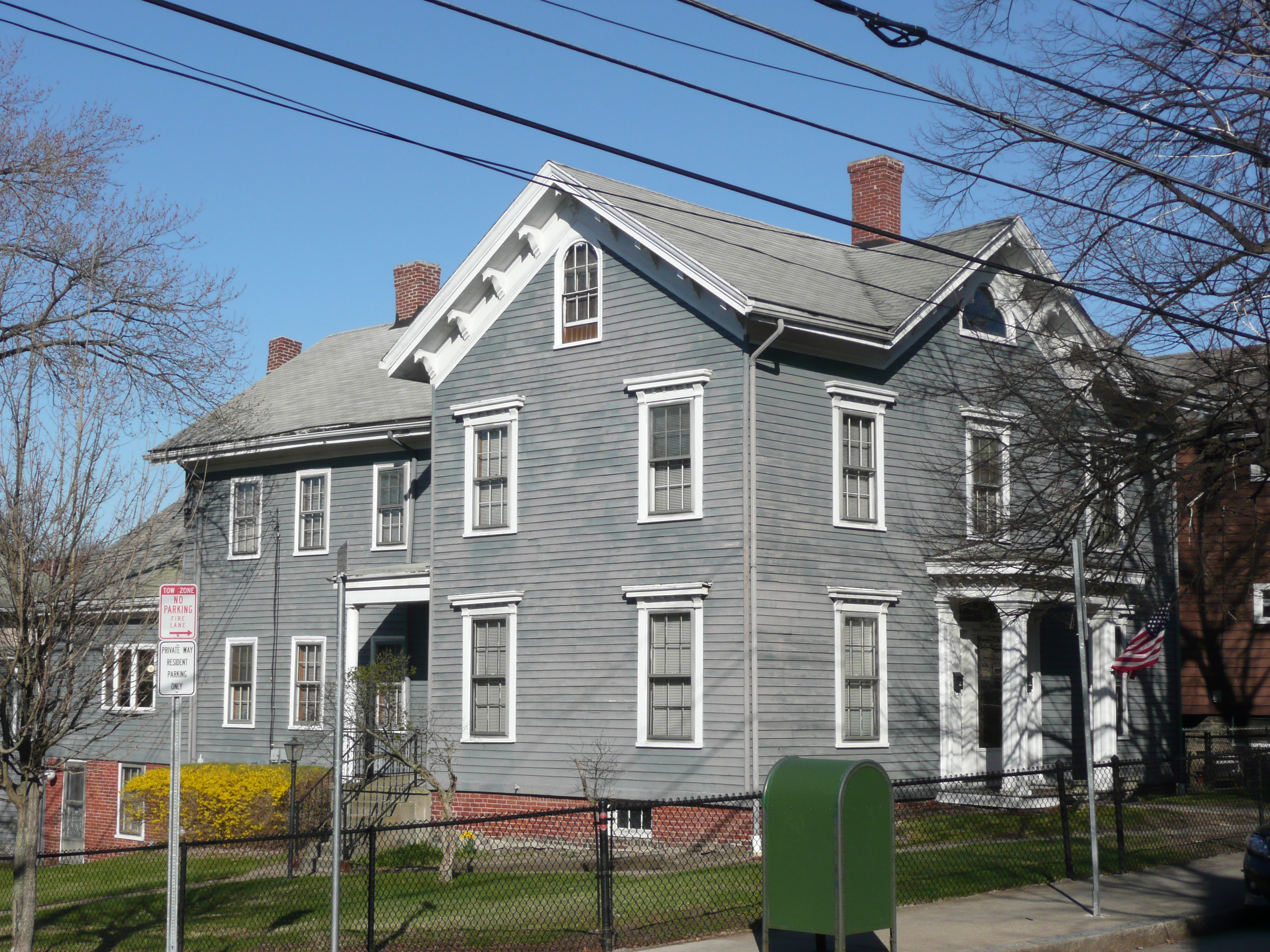

- Location within Massachusetts Location within the United States
- Location: 37 Albion Street, Somerville, Massachusetts
- Coordinates: 42°23′26.09″N 71°6′15.95″W
- Built: 1855
- Architectural style: Italianate
- MPS: Somerville MPS
- NRHP reference No.: 89001226
- Added to NRHP: September 18, 1989

The F. G. Williams House is a historic house in Somerville, Massachusetts. The 20-room, 2.5-story wood-frame house was built c. 1855 for Frank G. Williams, a dealer in kitchen furnishings, and is one of the city's best examples of a center-gable Italianate house. Details include the trefoil window in the center gable, round-arch windows in the side gable ends, as well as carved brackets under the deep gables and an ornate porch and window enframement. Purchased in 1955 by John and Genevieve Daly, they completely restored the exterior, including new roof and gutters in 2015.

The house was listed on the National Register of Historic Places in 1989.

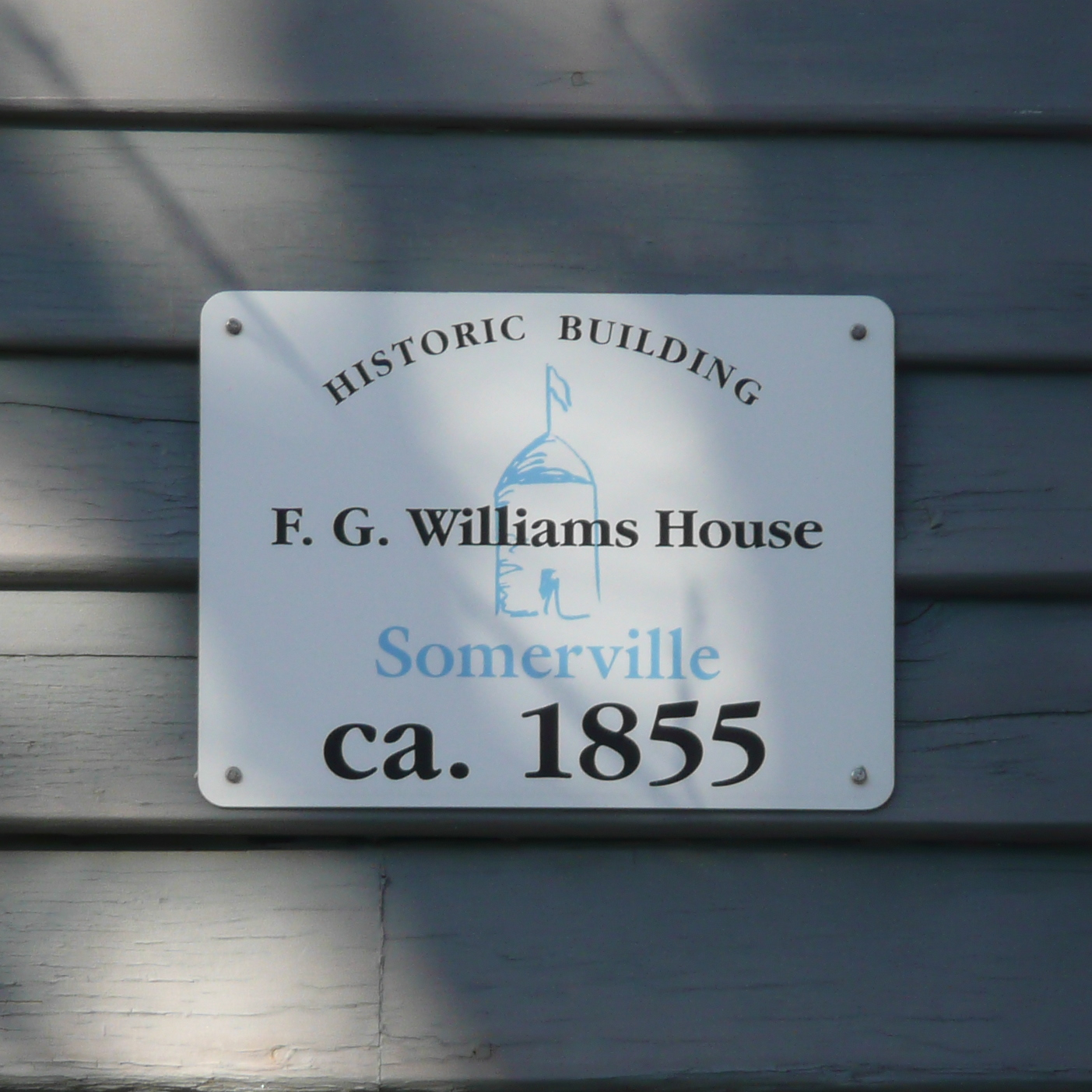
The identifying sign on the face of the F. G. Williams House

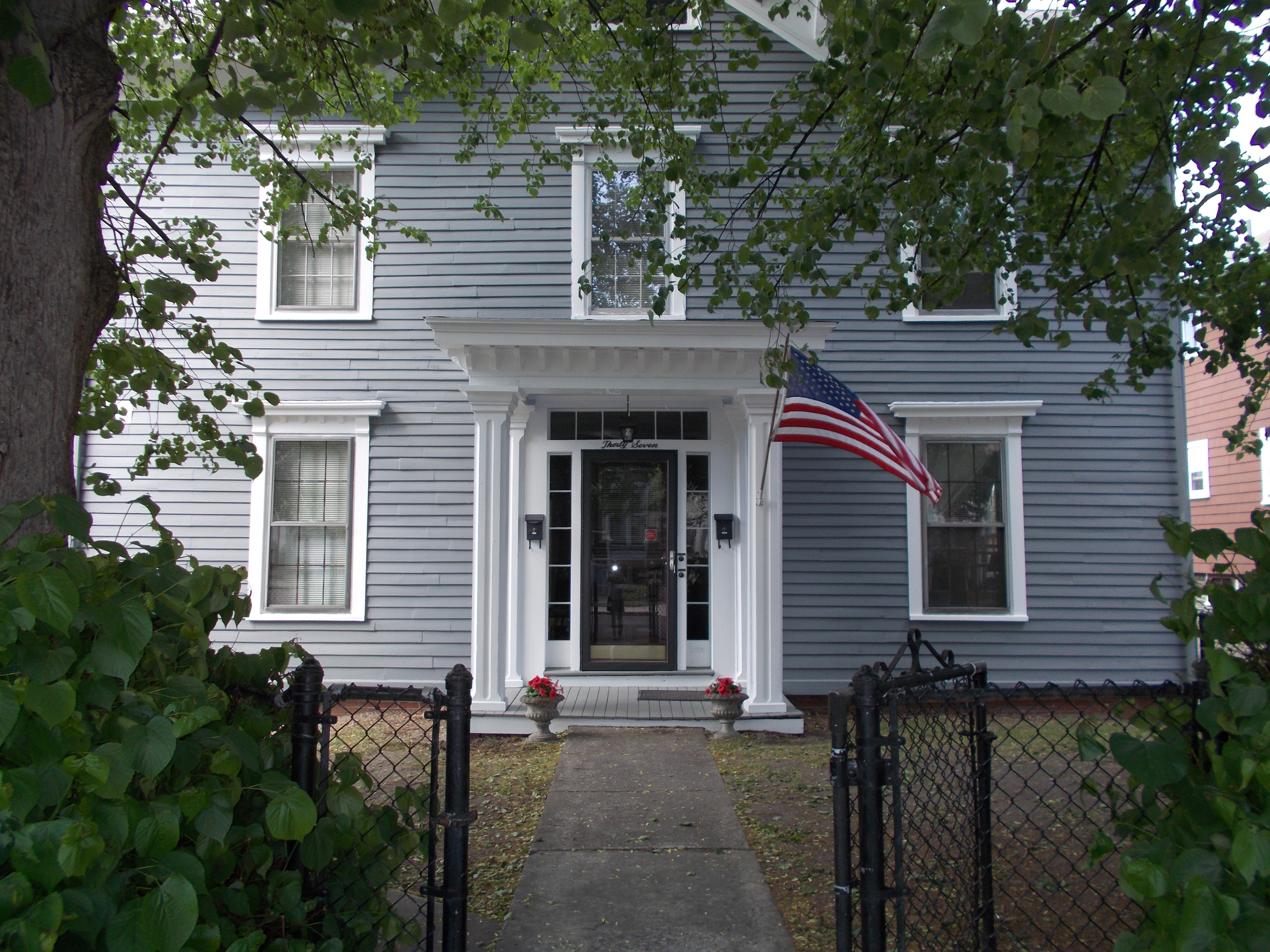

== See also ==
- National Register of Historic Places listings in Somerville, Massachusetts
