= Duckworth-Williams House =

Historic house in Arkansas, United States

- U.S. National Register of Historic Places
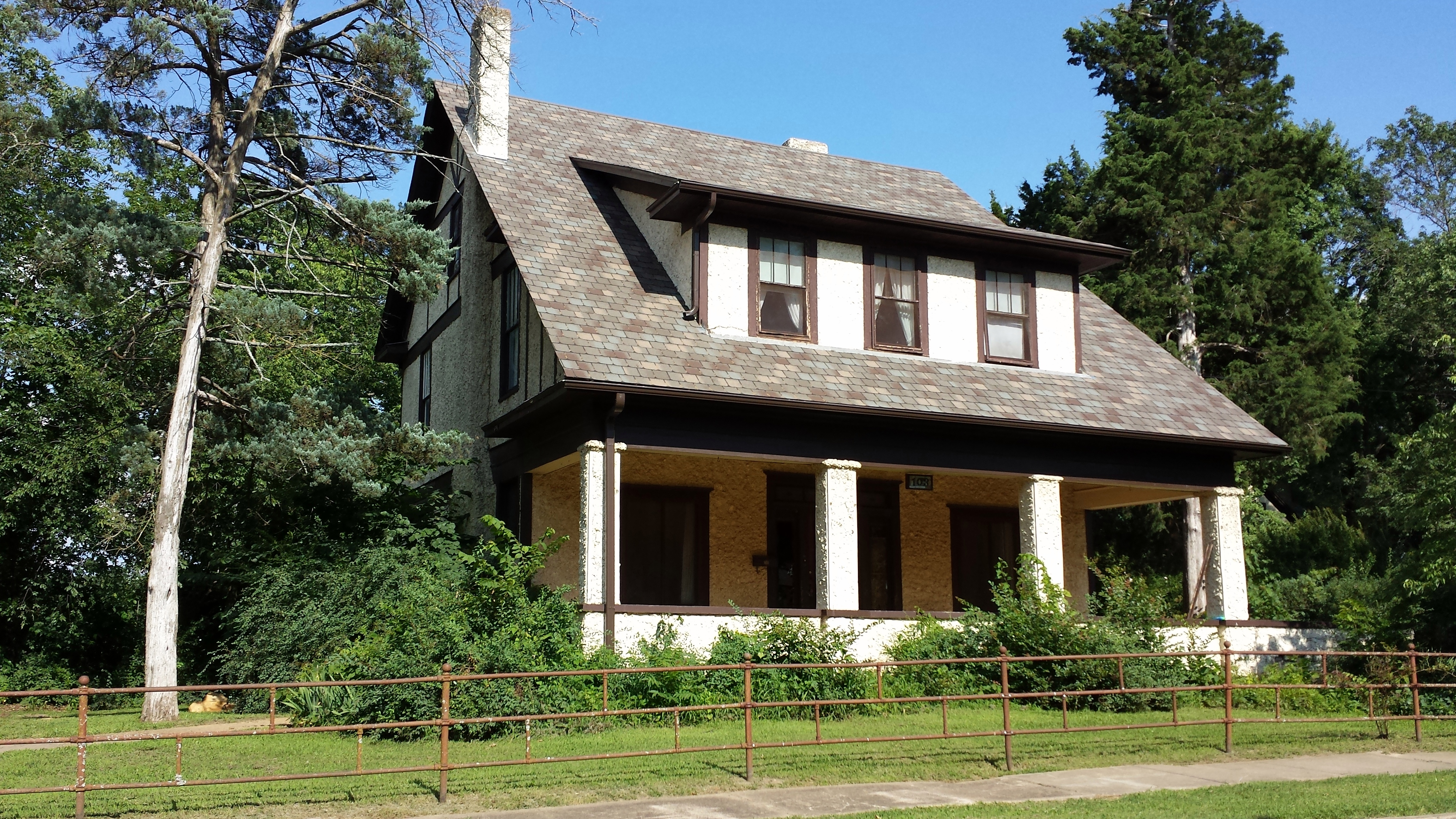

- Location within Arkansas Location within the United States
- Location: 103 S. College, Siloam Springs, Arkansas
- Coordinates: 36°11′6″N 94°32′34″W
- Area: less than one acre
- Built: 1910
- Architectural style: Tudor Revival
- MPS: Benton County MRA
- NRHP reference No.: 87002385
- Added to NRHP: January 28, 1988

The Duckworth-Williams House is a historic house at 103 South College Street in Siloam Springs, Arkansas. It is a two-story stuccoed brick building, with a side gable roof that has a wide shed-roof dormer on the front. The roof extends across the front porch, which is supported by four stuccoed brick columns. The side walls of the house have half-timbered stucco finish. Built c. 1910, this is the only Tudor Revival house in Siloam Springs.

The house was listed on the National Register of Historic Places in 1988.

== See also ==
- National Register of Historic Places listings in Benton County, Arkansas
