= James Williams House (Kenton, Delaware) =

Historic house and farm in Delaware, US

- U.S. National Register of Historic Places
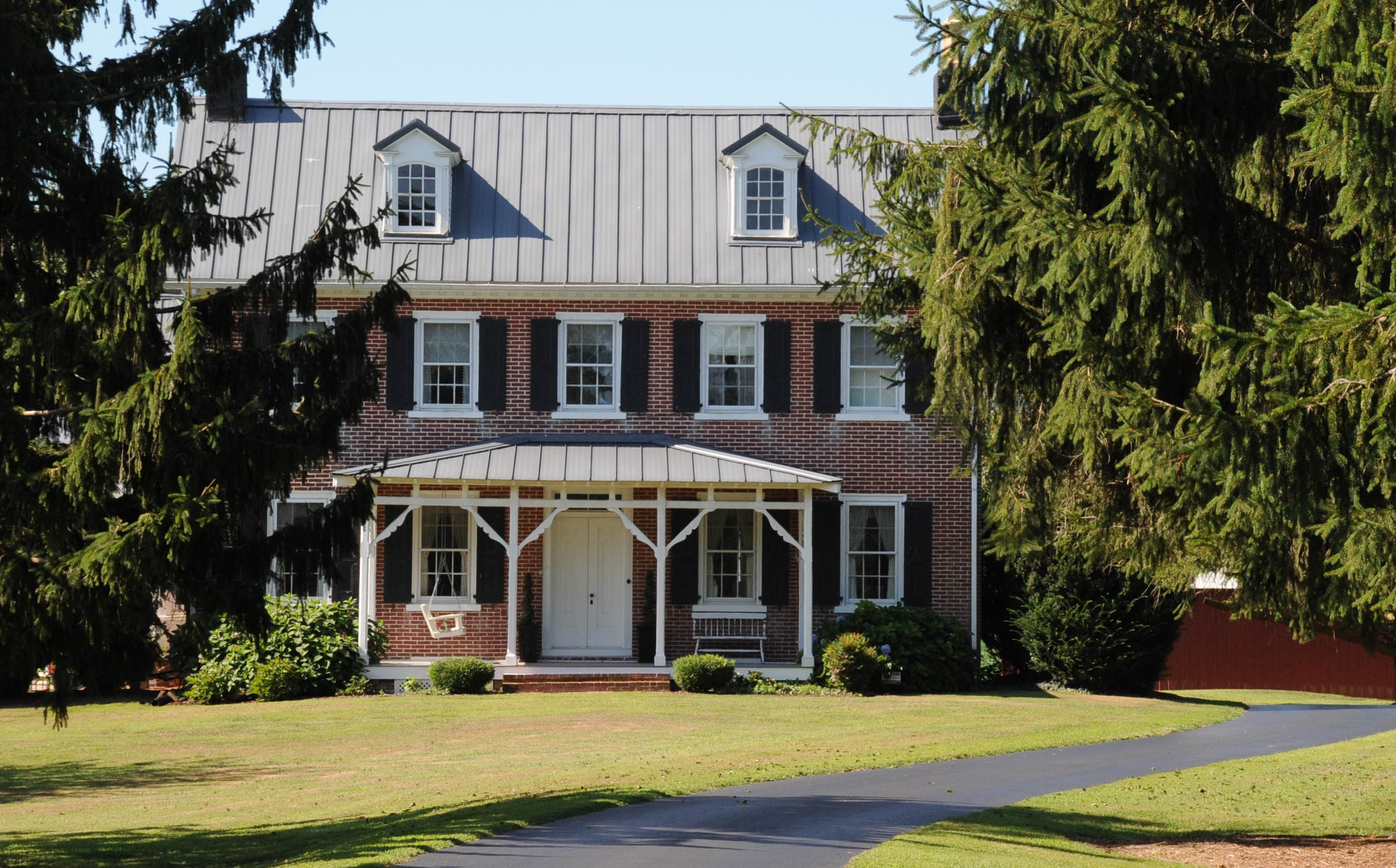

- Location within Delaware Location within the United States
- Location: 1064 7 Hickories Road, Kenton, Delaware
- Coordinates: 39.220030°N 75.646671°W
- Built: 1848
- Architectural style: Greek Revival, Federal
- MPS: Kenton Hundred MRA
- NRHP reference No.: 83001382
- Added to NRHP: June 27, 1983

The James Williams House is a historic home and farm complex in Kenton, Kent County, Delaware. The house was built in 1848 and is a two-story, five-bay, center-hall plan brick dwelling with Greek Revival details. It has a rear wing. The front facade features a three-bay porch with chamfered posts and sawn decorative brackets dated to the 1880s. Also on the property are a contributing barn, granary, and outhouse.

It was listed on the National Register of Historic Places in 1983.
