= John Williams House (Mount Vernon, Maine) =

Historic house in Maine, United States

- U.S. National Register of Historic Places
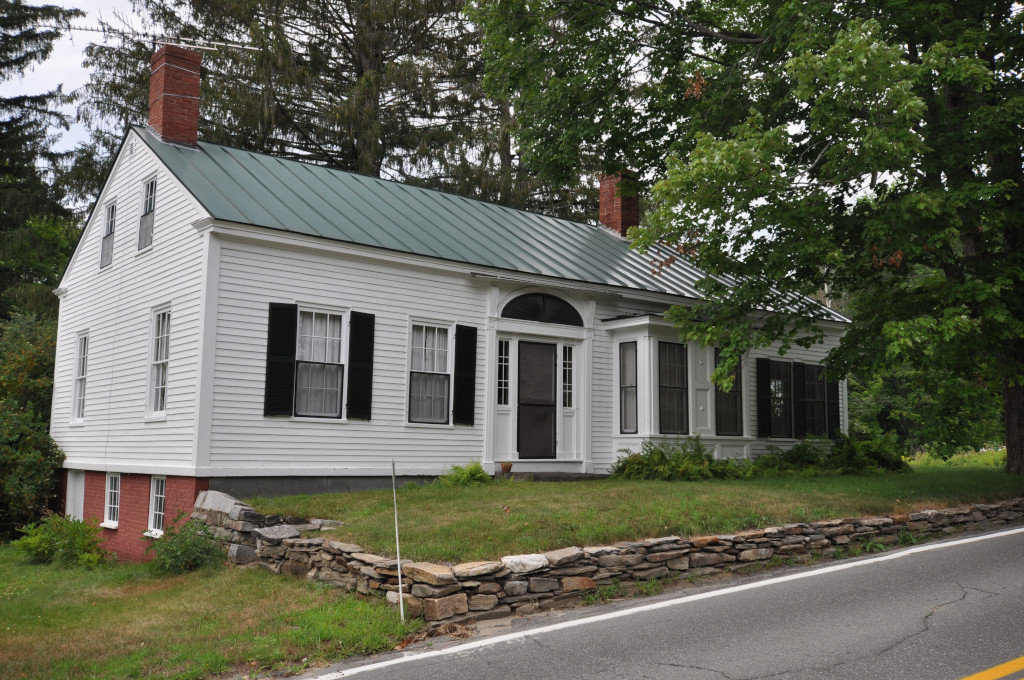

- Location within Maine Location within the United States
- Location: Pond Rd. (ME 41), Mount Vernon, Maine
- Coordinates: 44°30′7″N 69°59′19″W
- Area: 0.25 acres (0.10 ha)
- Built: 1827
- Built by: Williams, John; Eaton, Moses
- Architectural style: Federal Cape
- NRHP reference No.: 84000531
- Added to NRHP: December 6, 1984

The John Williams House is a historic house located on Pond Road (Maine State Route 41) in Mount Vernon, Maine. Built in 1827, this modest Cape is regarded for its high quality interior woodwork (executed by John Williams, a noted local cabinetmaker), and well-preserved stencilwork attributed to folk artist Moses Eaton. The house was listed on the National Register of Historic Places on December 6, 1984.

== Description and history ==
The house is located in the village center of Mount Vernon, on the west side of Pond Road a short way north of its junction with Main Street. It is a 1 1/2-story, wood-framed Cape, with a gabled roof, end chimneys, and clapboard siding. Its east-facing front facade is asymmetrical, with two window bays to the left of the centered entrance, and a projecting rectangular two-window box to its right. The entrance is flanked by sidelight windows and pilasters, and is topped by a large Federal style fan. Interior features include high-quality woodwork in the fireplace surround, which has pilasters and a pineapple motif, and stencilwork on many of its walls.

The house was built in 1827 by John Williams, a local cabinetmaker and builder. He was well known in the region, building several surviving houses, and was also known as a carriage maker. Examples of his furniture, built in a shop located adjacent to the house, has been displayed in the Maine State Museum. The stencilwork on the walls is attributed to folk artist Moses Eaton.

== See also ==
- National Register of Historic Places listings in Kennebec County, Maine
