= William Carlos Williams House =

Historic house in New Jersey, United States

- U.S. National Register of Historic Places
- New Jersey Register of Historic Places
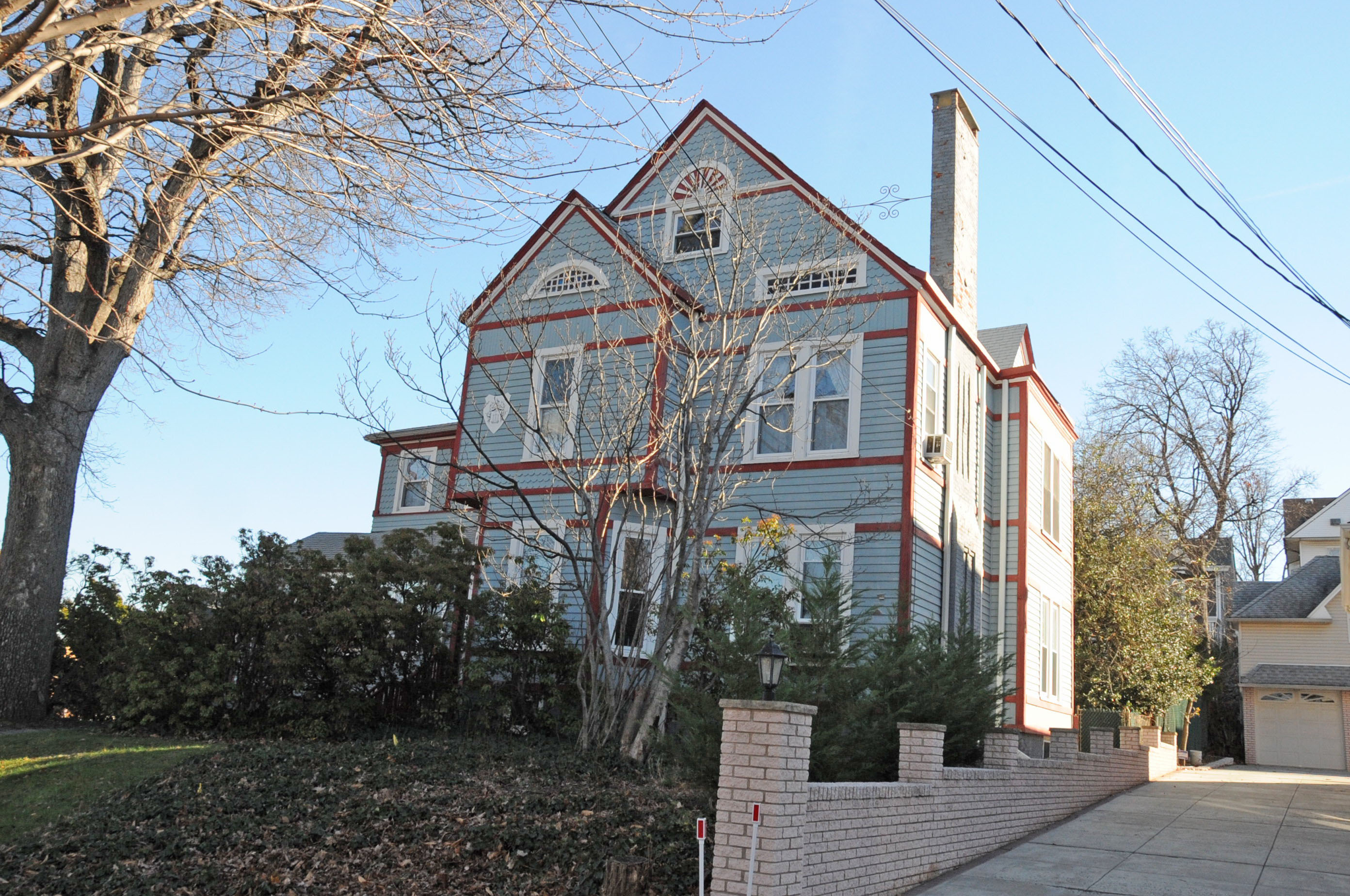

- Location within Bergen County, New Jersey Location within New Jersey Location within the United States
- Location: 9 Ridge Road, Rutherford, New Jersey
- Coordinates: 40°49′36″N 74°6′18″W
- Area: 0.5 acres (0.20 ha)
- Built: 1913
- NRHP reference No.: 73001082
- NJRHP No.: 669

Significant dates
- Added to NRHP: June 4, 1973
- Designated NJRHP: January 29, 1973

The William Carlos Williams House is located in Rutherford, Bergen County, New Jersey, United States. The building was built in 1913 and was the home to poet and physician William Carlos Williams for 50 years. The home was added to the National Register of Historic Places on June 4, 1973. The building is still used as a private residence and doctor's office.

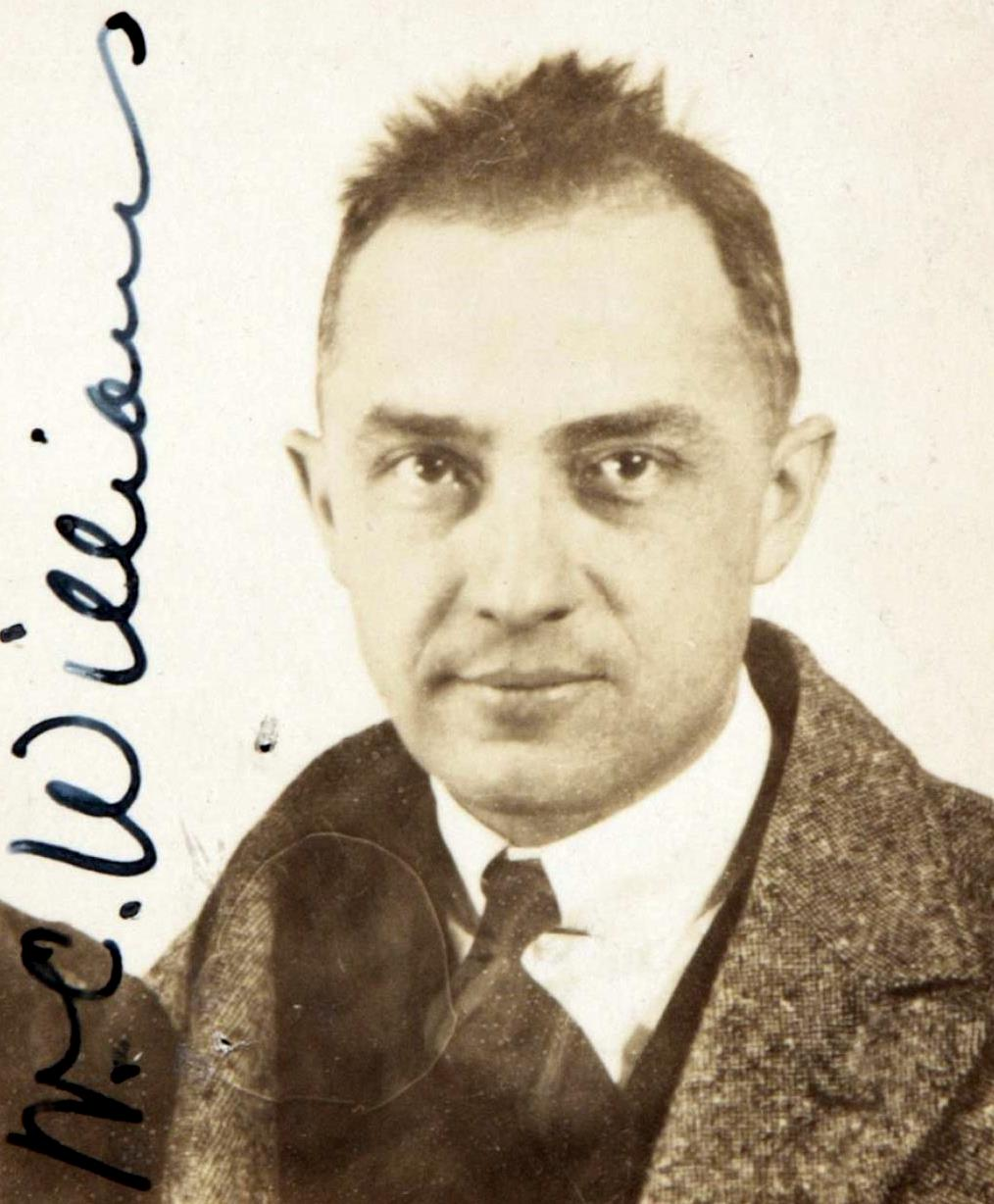
A picture of William Carlos Williams in 1921.

== See also ==
- National Register of Historic Places listings in Bergen County, New Jersey
