= Henry Williams House (Huntington, New York) =

Historic house in New York, United States

- U.S. National Register of Historic Places
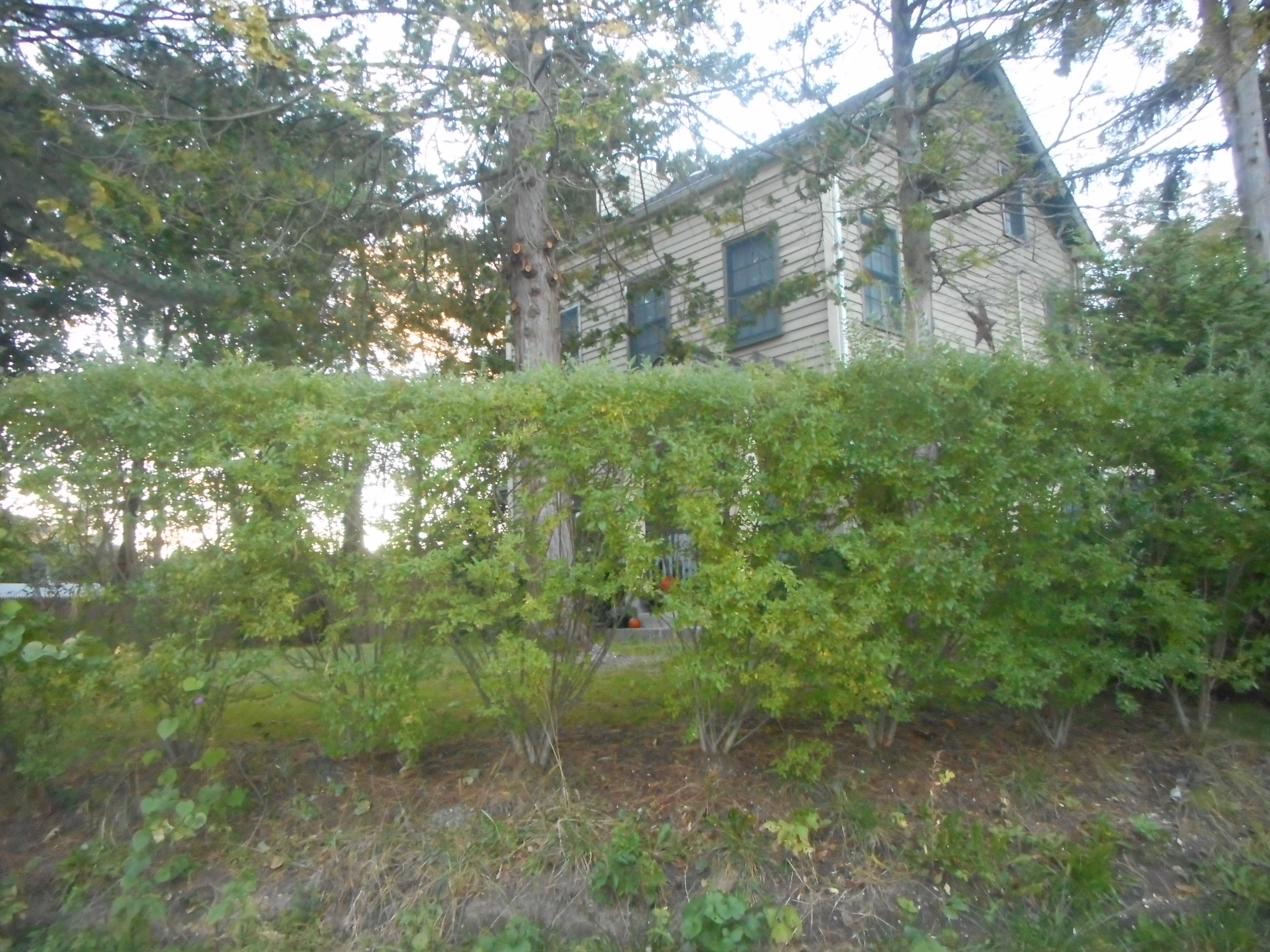
- The Henry Williams House in October 2018

- Location within New York Location within the United States
- Location: 43 Mill Lane; Halesite, New York
- Coordinates: 40°52′43.61″N 73°25′22.19″W
- Area: 0.8 acres (0.32 ha)
- Built: ca 1850
- Architectural style: American Picturesque
- MPS: Huntington Town MRA
- NRHP reference No.: 85002552
- Added to NRHP: September 26, 1985

The Henry Williams House is a historic home located in Halesite on the border with Huntington in Suffolk County, New York. It was built about 1850 and is a 2 1/2-story, three-bay residence with a 1-story, four-bay west wing. The house is representative of the American Picturesque-style.

It was listed on the National Register of Historic Places in 1985.
