= William G. and Anne Williams House =

Historic house in Wisconsin, United States

- U.S. National Register of Historic Places
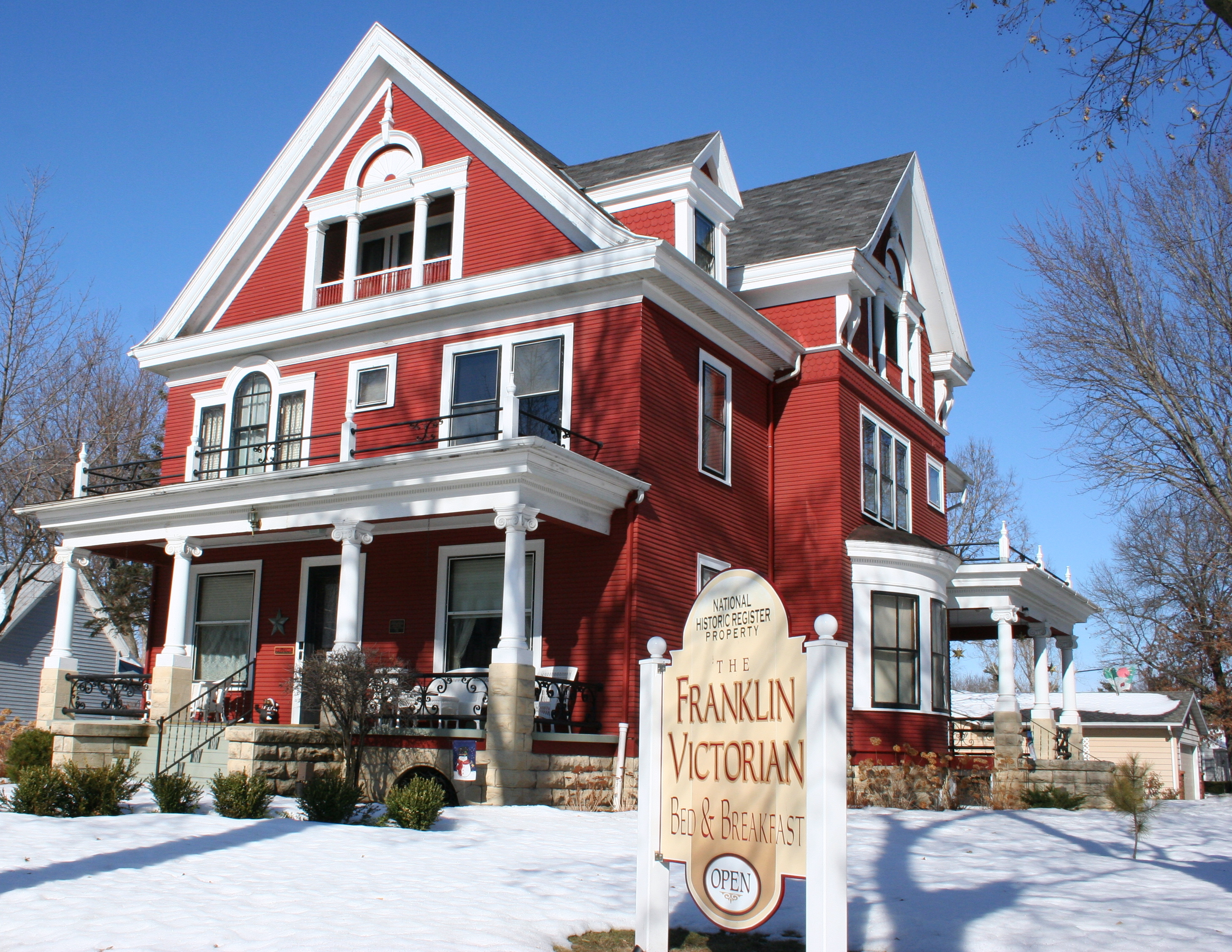
- The house in 2009

- Location within Wisconsin Location within the United States
- Location: 220 E. Franklin St., Sparta, Wisconsin
- Coordinates: 43°56′46″N 90°48′29″W
- Area: less than one acre
- Built: 1900
- Architect: Stoltze & Schick
- Architectural style: Queen Anne
- NRHP reference No.: 05000531
- Added to NRHP: June 1, 2005

The William G. and Anne Williams House is a historic building in Sparta, Wisconsin, USA, and was a four-room bed and breakfast.

The Williams house is a Queen Anne style Victorian home that has been on the Wisconsin State and National Register of Historic Places since 2005. The home is known officially on the historical register as the Williams, William G. and Anne, House. It was built by W. G. Williams, a banker in the small town. Today the home is a private residence for Mr. Elliott and Mr. Mueller.
