= Williams–Linscott House =

Historic house in Massachusetts, United States

- U.S. National Register of Historic Places
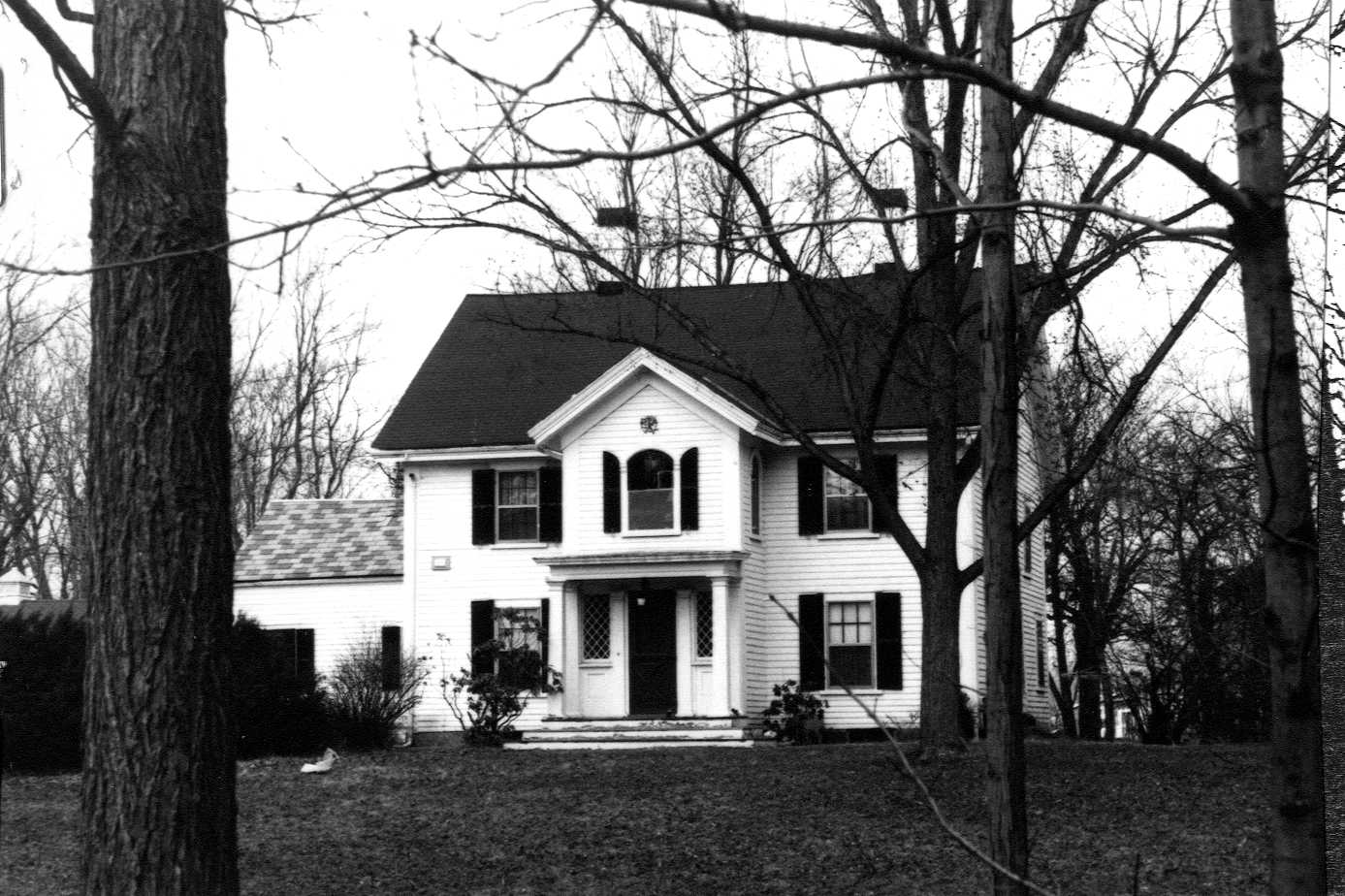
- c. 1979 photo

- Location within Massachusetts Location within the United States
- Location: 357 William St., Stoneham, Massachusetts
- Coordinates: 42°29′27″N 71°6′27″W
- Built: 1712
- Architectural style: Italianate, Georgian
- MPS: Stoneham MRA
- NRHP reference No.: 84002853
- Added to NRHP: April 13, 1984

The Williams–Linscott House was a historic First Period house at 357 William Street in Stoneham, Massachusetts. The oldest part of the house was said to date to c. 1712, but it is unclear to which part of the house this referred, on account of major alterations the house in the 18th and 19th centuries. It is believed to have begun as a four-room two-story structure built around a central chimney. This underwent significant alteration during the Federal period, including replacing the center chimney with smaller side chimneys, and the construction of four more rooms in front of the original four. Sometime around 1850 Micah Williams, a prosperous farmer, again refashioned the house in the then-popular Italianate style.

The house was listed on the National Register of Historic Places in 1984. It was demolished in 2004, although architectural elements of the house were salvaged and reused elsewhere.

== See also ==
- National Register of Historic Places listings in Stoneham, Massachusetts
- National Register of Historic Places listings in Middlesex County, Massachusetts
