= James Robert Williams House =

Historic house in Illinois, United States

- U.S. National Register of Historic Places
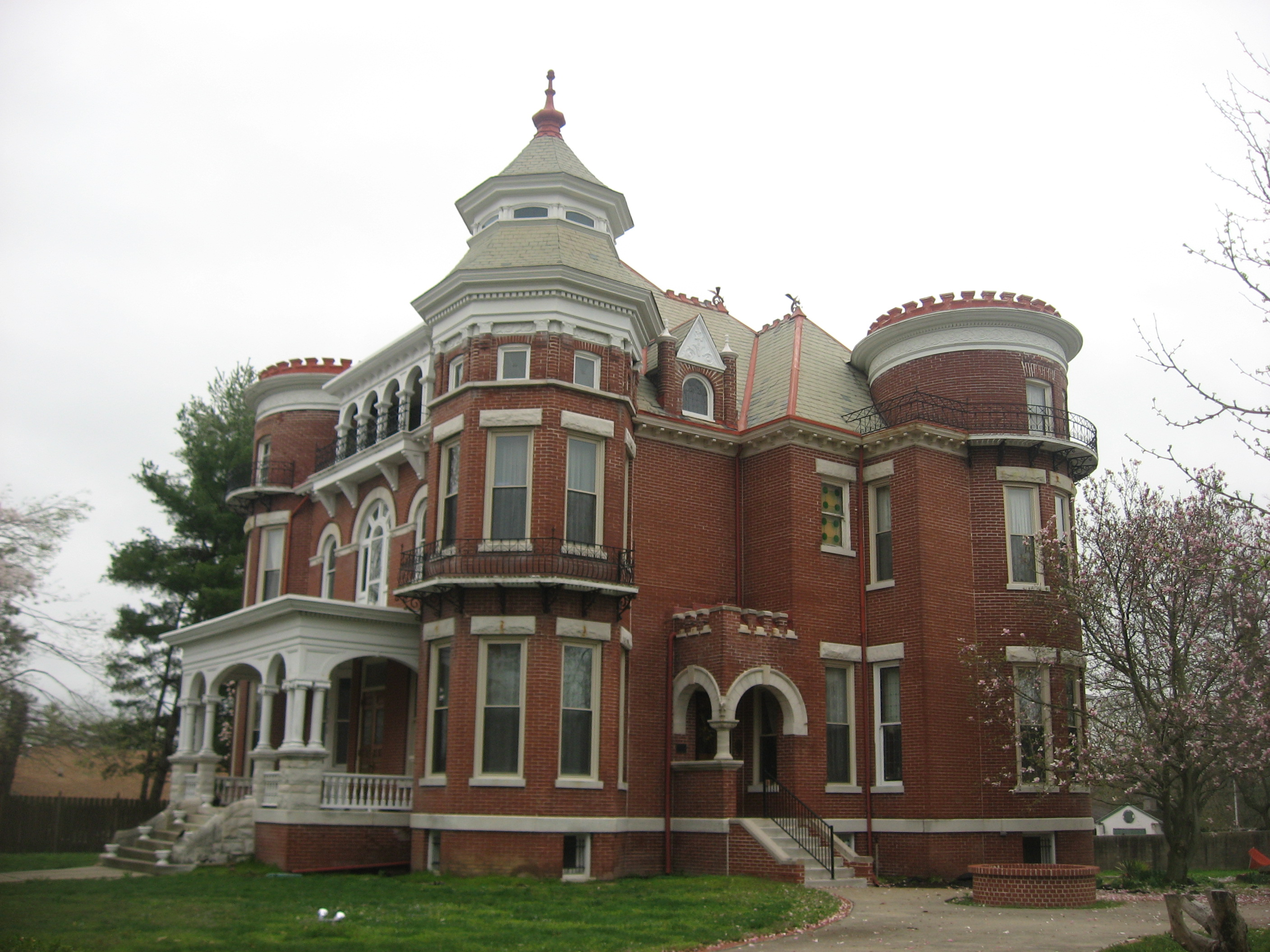

- Location within Illinois Location within the United States
- Location: 310 E. Main St., Carmi, Illinois
- Coordinates: 38°5′27″N 88°9′29″W
- Area: less than one acre
- Built: 1896
- Built by: Getaz, David
- Architect: Barber, George F.
- Architectural style: Queen Anne, Romanesque
- NRHP reference No.: 86003716
- Added to NRHP: January 29, 1987

The James Robert Williams House is a historic house located at 310 E. Main St. in Carmi, Illinois. The house was built in 1896 for James Robert Williams, a U.S. Representative and political ally of William Jennings Bryan. Prominent residential architect George Franklin Barber designed the red brick house in a blend of the Romanesque Revival and Queen Anne styles. The house has three corner towers, two with crenellated tops and one with a double bell roof; the towers cause the building to resemble a castle. The house's front entrance is surrounded by an arched porch with a balcony on its roof. A loggia is located above the entrance on the house's third level.

The house was added to the National Register of Historic Places on January 29, 1987.
