= Charles Williams Jr. House =

Historic house in Massachusetts, United States

- Charles Williams Jr.
- U.S. National Register of Historic Places
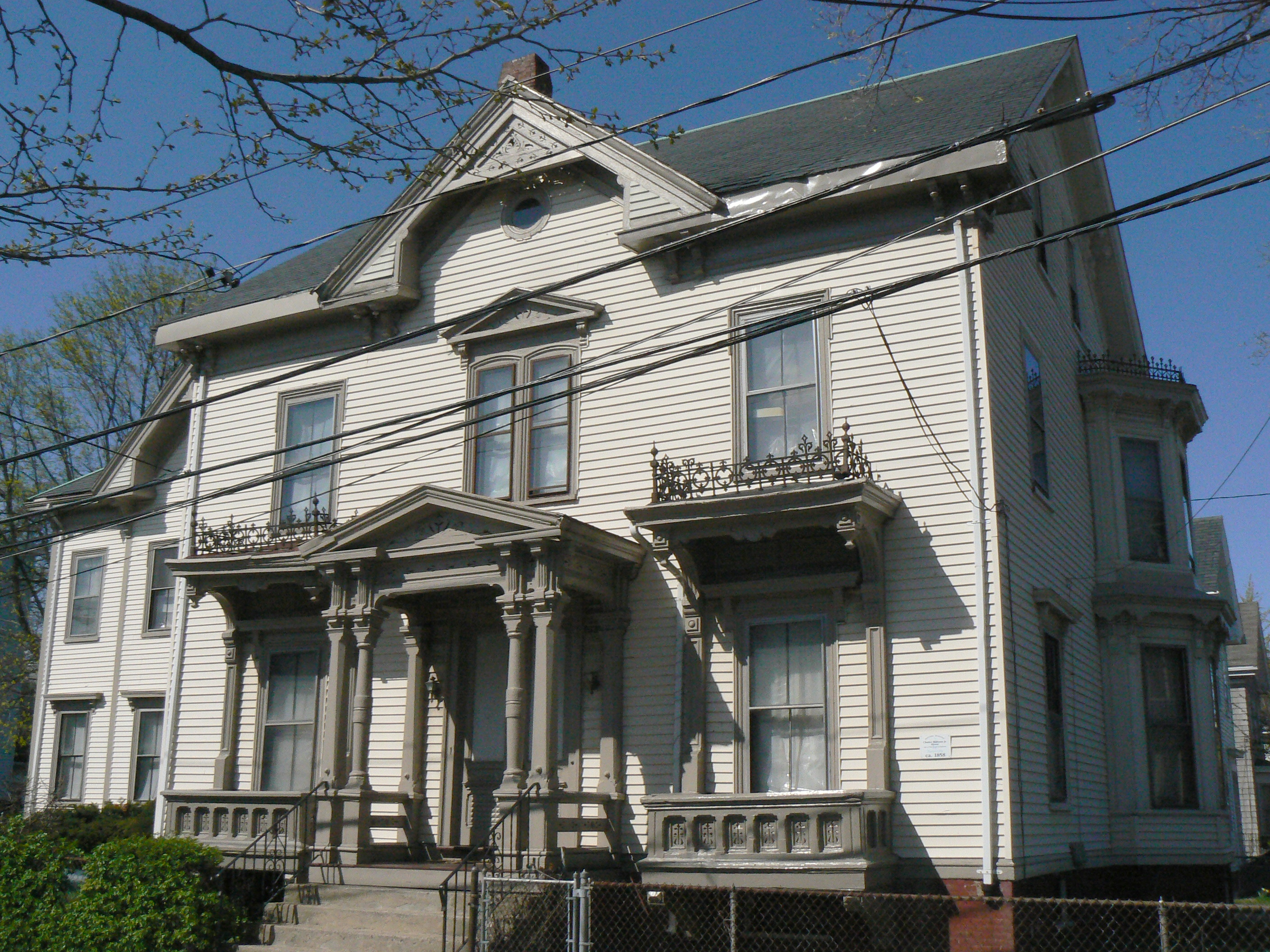

- Location within Massachusetts Location within the United States
- Location: 1 Arlington Street, Somerville, Massachusetts
- Coordinates: 42°23′9″N 71°4′55″W
- Built: 1858
- Architectural style: Italianate
- MPS: Somerville MPS
- NRHP reference No.: 89001228
- Added to NRHP: September 18, 1989

The Charles Williams Jr. House, built in 1858, is a historic house in Somerville, Massachusetts. Charles Williams Jr. was a manufacturer of electrical telegraph instruments at 109 Court Street in Boston. Alexander Graham Bell and Thomas A. Watson experimented with the telephone in Williams' shop, and it was there that they first heard indistinct sounds transmitted on June 2, 1875. The first permanent residential telephone service in the world was installed at this house in 1877, connecting Williams' home with his shop on Court Street in Boston. Williams had telephone Numbers 1 and 2 of the Bell Telephone Company.

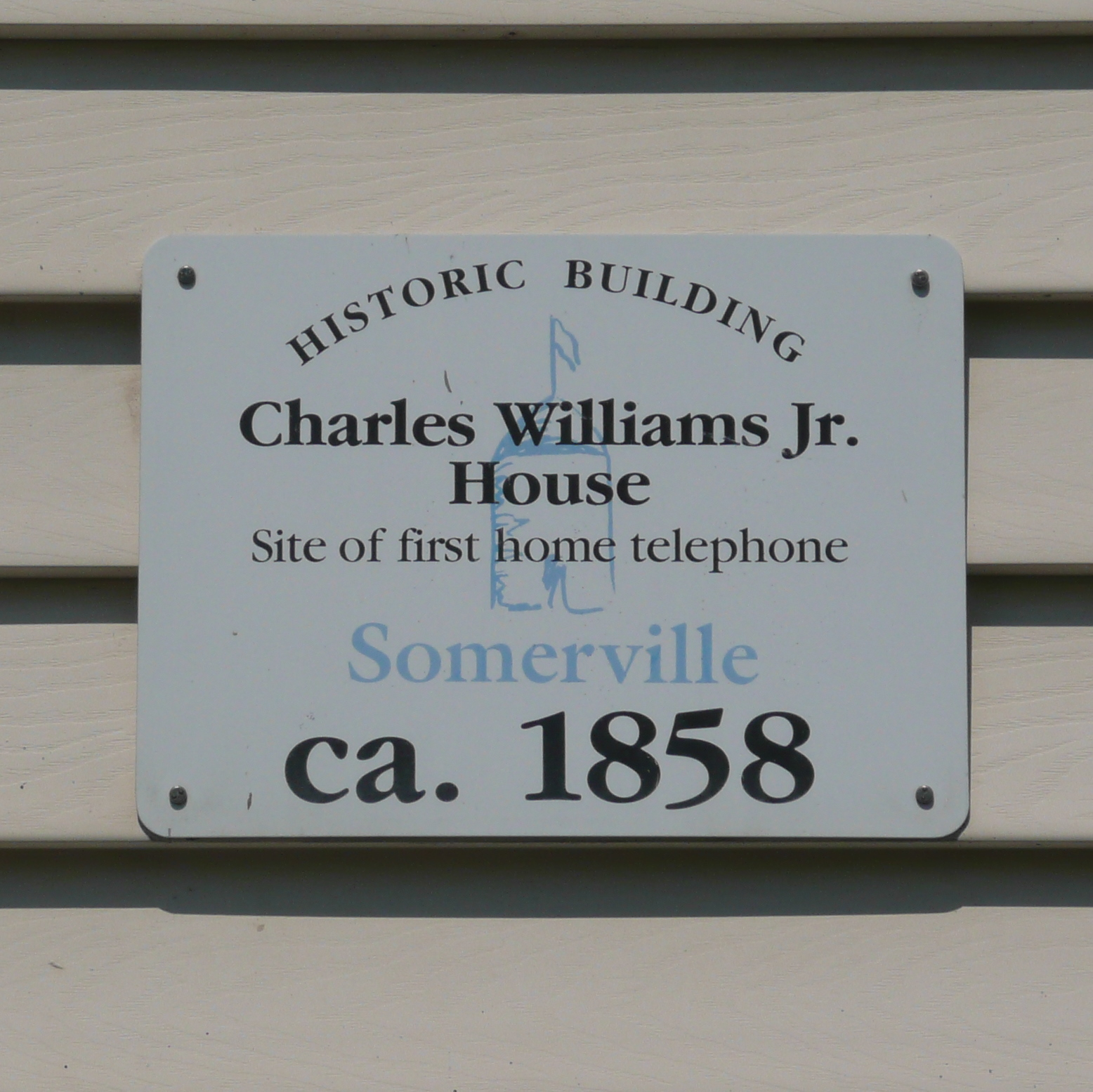
The identifying sign on the face of the Charles Williams Jr. House

== See also ==
- National Register of Historic Places listings in Somerville, Massachusetts
