= John Williams House (Williams Grove, Pennsylvania) =

Historic house in Pennsylvania, United States

- U.S. National Register of Historic Places
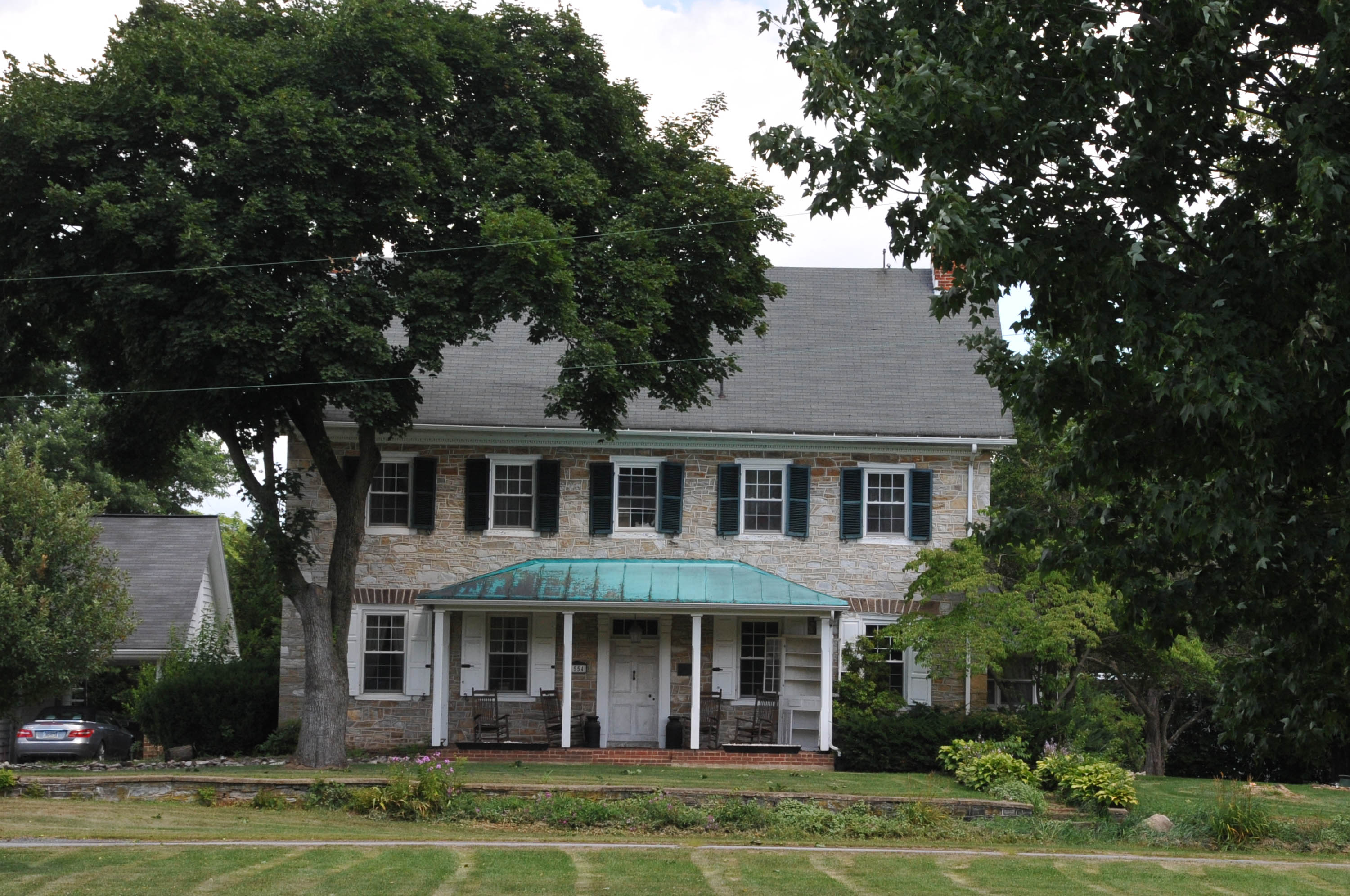

- Location within Pennsylvania Location within the United States
- Location: 1554 Williams Grove Rd., 0.5 miles (0.80 km) south of Williams Grove, Williams Grove, Pennsylvania
- Coordinates: 40°8′52″N 77°1′49″W
- Area: 0.5 acres (0.20 ha)
- Built: c. 1799-1802
- Architectural style: Georgian
- NRHP reference No.: 77001161
- Added to NRHP: July 28, 1977

The John Williams House, also known as the Williams Mansion House, is an historic home that is located near Williams Grove in Cumberland County, Pennsylvania, United States.

It was listed on the National Register of Historic Places in 1977.

== History and architectural features ==
Built between 1799 and 1802, this historic structure is a large, 2 1/2-story, limestone building, five bays wide and two bays deep. It has a Georgian floorplan. An extensive interior remodeling took place circa 1825; the house was also then restored in 1970. A porch was added during the mid-nineteenth century.
