= John C. Williams House =

Historic house in Florida, United States

- U.S. National Register of Historic Places
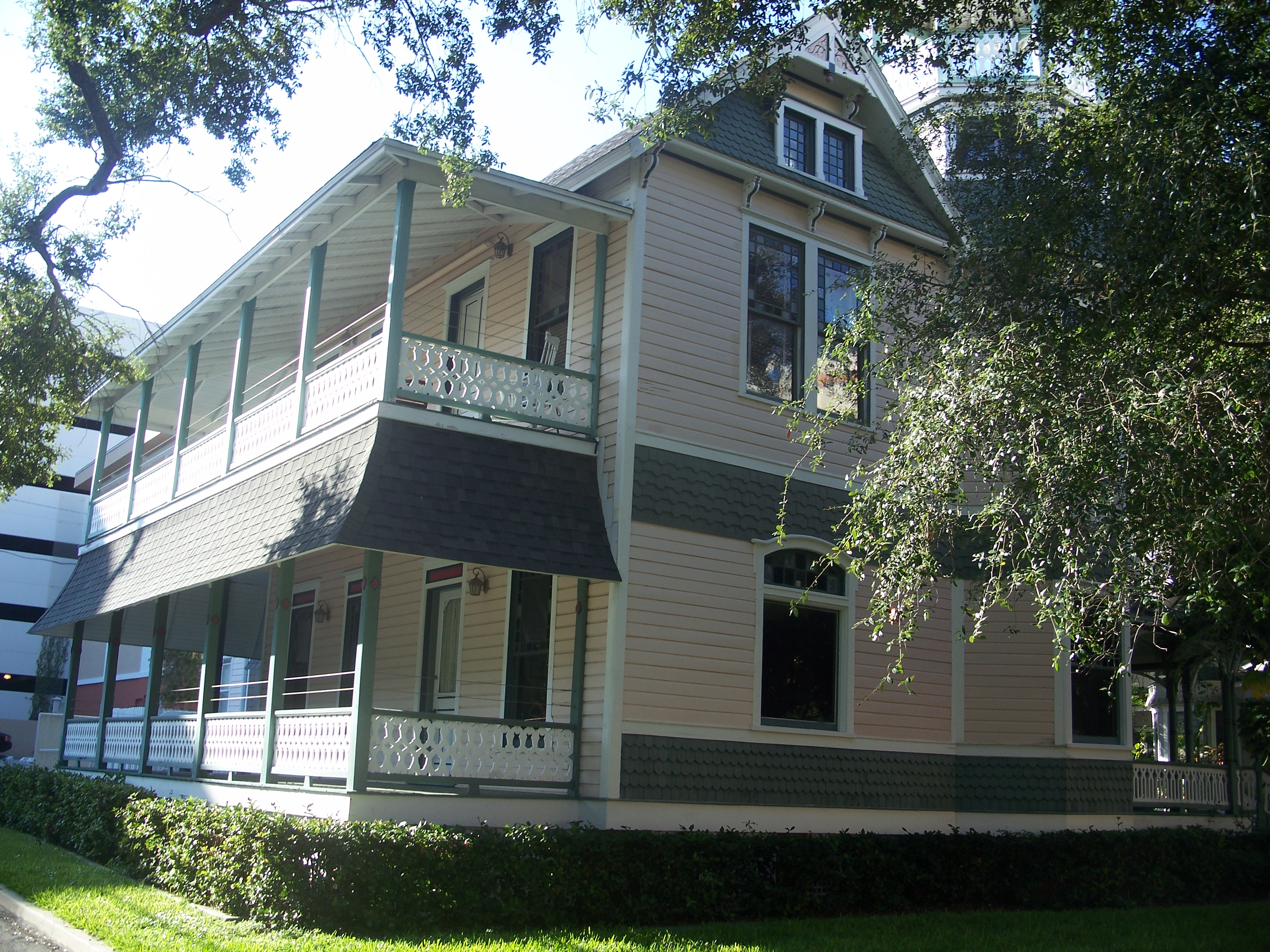

- Location within Florida Location within the United States
- Location: St. Petersburg, Florida
- Coordinates: 27°46′9.16″N 82°38′7.92″W
- Built: 1891
- Architectural style: Queen Anne
- NRHP reference No.: 75000565
- Added to NRHP: April 24, 1975

The John C. Williams House (also known as the Manhattan Hotel or Williams Mansion) is a historic home in St. Petersburg, Florida. Originally located at 444 5th Avenue South, it was subsequently purchased by the University of South Florida and moved to 511 Second Street South, on the Bayboro campus. On April 24, 1975, it was added to the U.S. National Register of Historic Places.

This house was built in 1891 and is Queen Ann architecture. Today it serves as the University of South Florida St. Petersburg Developmental Offices.
