= John and Ann Williams House =

Historic house in Montana, United States

- U.S. National Register of Historic Places
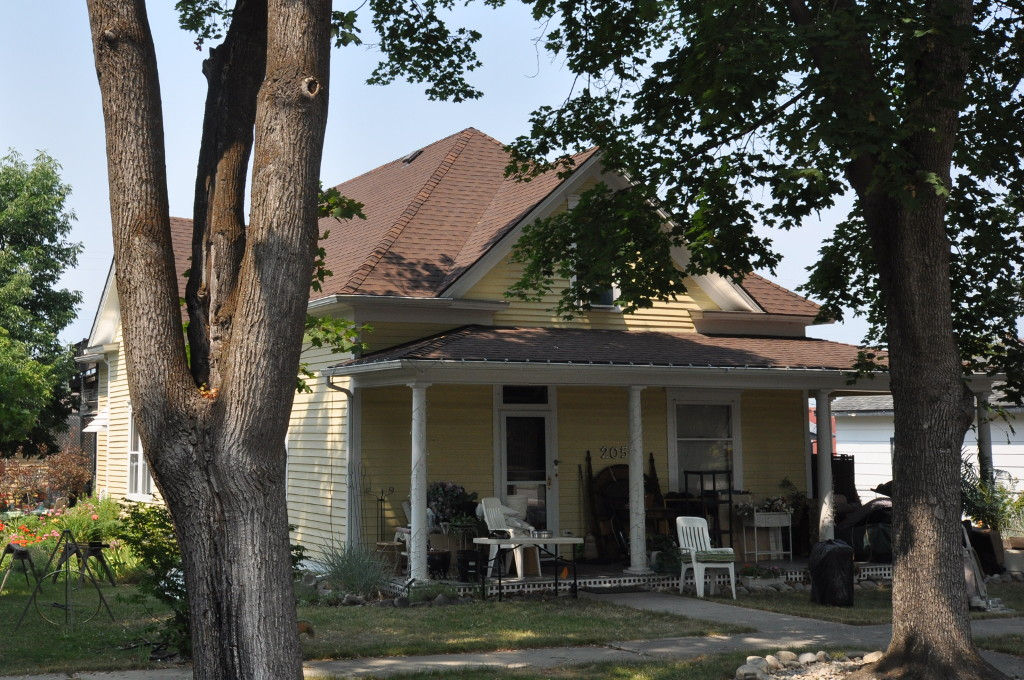
- Location: 205 Church St., Stevensville, Montana
- Coordinates: 46°30′37″N 114°05′29″W
- Area: less than one acre
- Built: 1907
- Built by: Williams, John T.
- Architectural style: Colonial Revival
- MPS: Stevensville MPS
- NRHP reference No.: 91000735
- Added to NRHP: June 19, 1991

The John and Ann Williams House, at 205 Church St. in Stevensville, Montana, United States, was built in 1907. It was listed on the National Register of Historic Places in 1991.

It is a one-and-half-story cottage built during a period of architectural transition; it is sort of like a Queen Anne-style cottage in its massing and fenestration, but it includes more elements suggestive of Colonial Revival style. These are: "shallow pitched rooflines, horizontal orientation, prominent porches and clean, unembellished lines." The house has an open front porch and an enclosed rear porch.

It was built for Ann and John Williams, a blacksmith, who purchased the property in 1903. In 1914 it was sold to William M. Hooper and Ester Mabel Hooper. Hooper operated a meat market on the east side of Main Street from 1906 on, sharing that with his brother from 1907 on, and in 1911 he took over the Bitterroot Restaurant. The Williams died in 1940 and 1952.

A one-story gable-roofed shed built in 1909 is a second contributing building in the listing.
