= Potter–Williams House (Davenport, Iowa) =

Historic house in Iowa, United States

- U.S. National Register of Historic Places
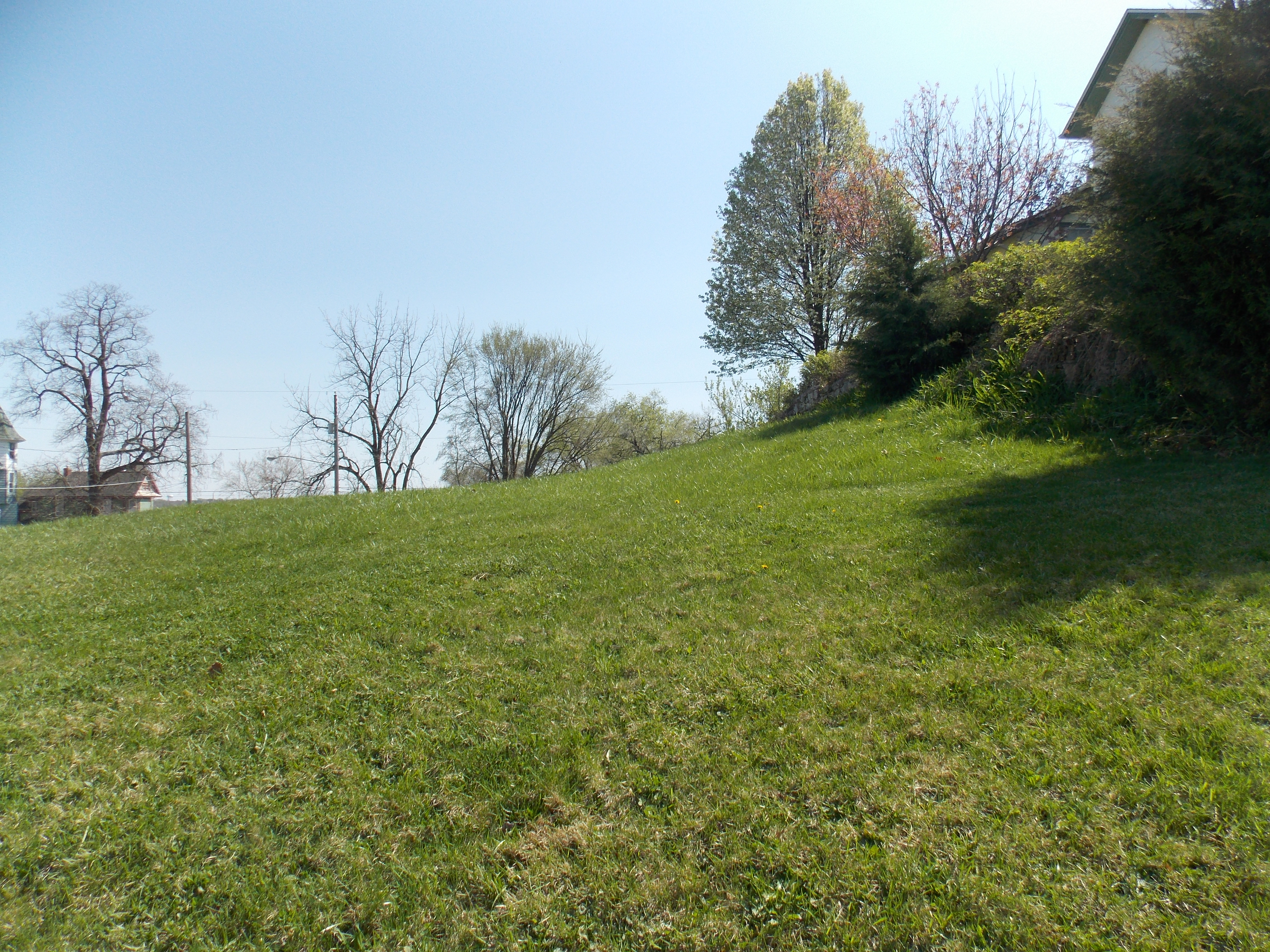
- The hill the house was built into is seen on the right.

- Location within Iowa Location within the United States
- Location: 427 E. 7th St. Davenport, Iowa
- Coordinates: 41°31′59″N 90°35′26″W
- Area: less than one acre
- Built: 1872
- Architectural style: Greek Revival
- MPS: Davenport MRA
- NRHP reference No.: 84001522
- Added to NRHP: April 5, 1984

The Potter–Williams House was a historic building located on the east side of Davenport, Iowa, United States. This Vernacular style Greek Revival residence was built in 1873. It was listed on the National Register of Historic Places in 1984, and has subsequently been torn down.

== History ==
Waldo M. Potter, the editor of the Davenport Gazette, had this house built from 1872 to 1873. Alexander F. Williams, a partner in the wholesale and retail hardware firm Seig & Williams, bought the house in 1878. He continued to live here into the 1890s. Williams initially was involved in dry goods, but eventually moved into hardware. Seig & Williams was formed in 1869 and sold heavy hardware. Williams oversaw the buying for the company.

== Architecture ==
The house was neither a pure representation of the Greek Revival style nor was it a typical expression of the style built by local builders. Instead, it was an adaptation based on the unusual topography of the site. From three sides the house was three stories tall, but the west side was built into a hill, so it appeared to be only two stories. It also stood out in a neighborhood that was mostly made up of small to medium-sized frame houses.

The Potter–Williams House was a T-shaped structure with a gabled roof and a three-story porch in the reentrant angle. The gable ends featured a wide, molded frieze. The first floor was composed of battered stone walls while the upper floors were brick. All of the windows were rectangular, and those on the second floor were taller than the windows on the other floors. The lintels were all composed of stone, and were probably influenced by the Italianate style that gained in prominence in Davenport after the Civil War. Another decorative feature that was popular in other Greek revival houses in the city was a narrow molding strip that suggested a frieze. The hood over the west entrance of the house reflected the American Craftsman style.
