= Potter–Williams House (Huntington, New York) =

Historic house in New York, United States

- U.S. National Register of Historic Places
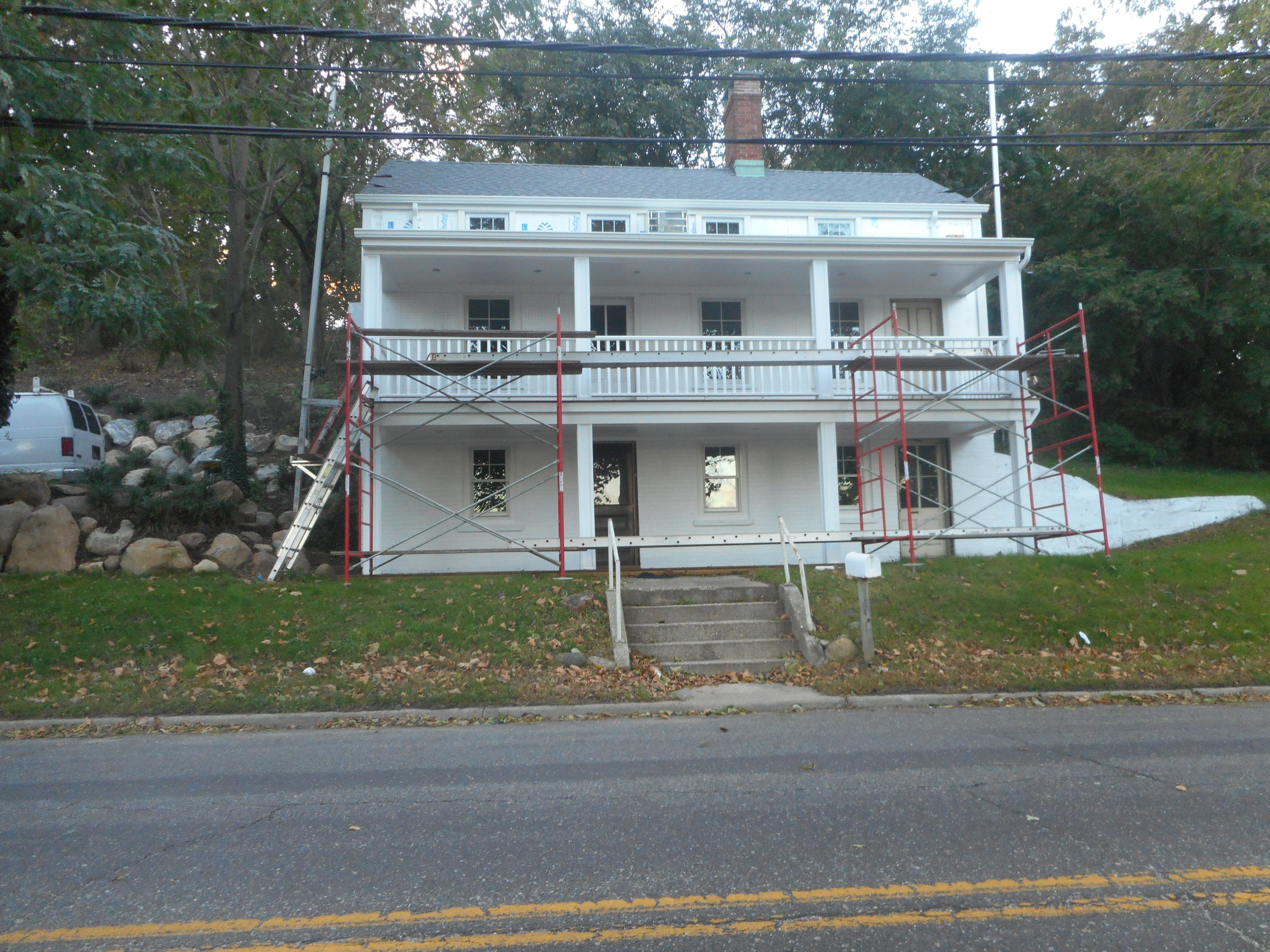
- The Potter-Williams House in the process of restoration in October 2018.

- Location within New York Location within the United States
- Location: 165 Wall Street, Huntington, New York
- Coordinates: 40°52′35.4″N 73°25′32.6″W
- Area: 2 acres (0.81 ha)
- Built: 1827
- Architect: Potter, Nathaniel
- MPS: Huntington Town MRA
- NRHP reference No.: 85002579
- Added to NRHP: September 26, 1985

Potter–Williams House is a historic home located at Huntington in Suffolk County, New York. It is a 1 1/2-story, four-bay, gable-roofed clapboard structure resting on a 1-story raised stone foundation. It features a massive central chimney and three pane frieze windows. It was built in 1827 and representative of the late settlement period of Huntington. Also on the property is a springhouse.

It was added to the National Register of Historic Places in 1985.
