= Dow House =

Dow House may refer to the following buildings in the United States (by state then town):

- Dow-Rosenzweig House, Denver, Colorado, listed on the National Register of Historic Places (NRHP) in northeast Denver
- Simon E. Dow House, listed as the "Dow House" on the NRHP in Crawford County, Iowa
- Neal S. Dow House in Portland, Maine, a National Historic Landmark and listed on the NRHP
- Lenoir Dow House, Waltham, Massachusetts, listed on the NRHP in Middlesex County
- Alden B. Dow House and Studio, Midland, Michigan, a National Historic Landmark and listed on the NRHP in Midland County
- Herbert H. Dow House, Midland, Michigan, listed on the NRHP in Midland County
- Dow House (Mansfield, Ohio), listed on listed on the NRHP in Richland County
- J.B. Dow House and Carpenter Douglas Barn, Beloit, Wisconsin, listed on the NRHP in Rock County
- John T. Dow House, Evansville, Wisconsin, listed on the NRHP in Rock County

== See also ==
- Dow Block, Stoneham, Massachusetts, listed on the NRHP in Middlesex County
- Dow Hall (disambiguation)
- Dower house, a house on a British estate for the use of the widow of the previous owner of the estate
