= Sweetser House =

Sweetser House may refer to:

- Sweetser Residence, Redondo Beach, California, listed on the National Register of Historic Places listings in Los Angeles County, California
- Warren Sweetser House, Stoneham, Massachusetts, listed on the National Register of Historic Places in Middlesex County, Massachusetts
- Daniel Sweetser House, Wakefield, Massachusetts, listed on the National Register of Historic Places in Middlesex County, Massachusetts
- Michael Sweetser House, Wakefield, Massachusetts, listed on the National Register of Historic Places in Middlesex County, Massachusetts
