= Sandro Corsaro =

American animator and author

- Born: Sandro Mario Corsaro
- Education: University of Southern California
- Occupations: Producer, animator, author
- Years active: 2002–Present
- Known for: Kick Buttowski: Suburban Daredevil
- Website: https://www.sandrocorsaro.com/

Sandro Mario Corsaro is an American business executive, producer, animator, and author. He has served as the head of global creative & content of Wayfair since 2022 and was the former senior vice-president (SVP) and chief creative officer (CCO) of Rotten Tomatoes and Fandango. He is the creator of the Disney XD animated series Kick Buttowski: Suburban Daredevil (2010-2012).

== Early life ==
Growing up in Stoneham, Massachusetts, Corsaro began showing interest in drawing at age 3 while attending St. John’s Preparatory School in Danvers, MA., and continued to pursue this passion throughout his adolescence. His father, Mario, owned a shoe store in the North End.

Like his show's protagonist, Corsaro often performed downhill stunts via skateboards, bikes, and toboggans. However, a leg injury from one bike trick required him to be hospitalized at Lahey Hospital.

== Career ==
In 1999, he moved across to the West Coast to attend the University of Southern California, where he majored in both Fine Arts and Animation. While still in college, he worked as a production associate on The Iron Giant. After graduating, he was a development intern on Osmosis Jones.

While working as an animator in 2002, Corsaro came up with his show's titular protagonist, which he then named "Kid Knievel." He allotted time, often at 4 A.M., to work an animated pitch introducing characters from the proposed show. His hometown of Stoneham inspired the fictional town in Kick Buttowski, evident from landmarks including the Stoneham library, the town square, and streets including Broadway, Main Street, Bear Hill Road, and Kenneth Terrace.

In 2006, his proficiency in Flash helped him become creative director of Disney Online.

After finishing the animated short, he hired an agent to help him pitch the cartoon to Disney. After 8 years of concept and pitching, with many rejections, it was officially picked up in 2010 and the protagonist's name was changed from Kid Knievel to Kick Buttowski.

Corsaro has worked at numerous entertainment companies and is also an author. In his books, he shares his distinctive techniques for applying traditional animation principles in the digital environment. Sandro has spoken at Siggraph, NAB, Flashforward, and on G4. He also served as a consultant to Adobe.

In 2013, Corsaro became Chief Creative Executive at Fandango.

== Partial bibliography ==
- Corsaro, S. (2002). The Flash Animator. Indianapolis, Ind: New Riders. ISBN 0-7357-1282-4
- Corsaro, S., & Parrott, C. J. (2004). Hollywood 2D Digital Animation: The New Flash Production Revolution. Boston, Mass: Thomson Course Technology. ISBN 1-59200-170-X
- Corsaro, S. (2003). Flash MX: animación. Diseño y creatividad. Madrid: Anaya Multimedia. ISBN 84-415-1548-4

== Filmography ==
- 2010–2012: Kick Buttowski: Suburban Daredevil - creator, executive producer, and the voice of the DiPazzi Twins.
