= Amasa Farrier House =

Historic house in Massachusetts, United States

- U.S. National Register of Historic Places
- U.S. Historic district – Contributing property
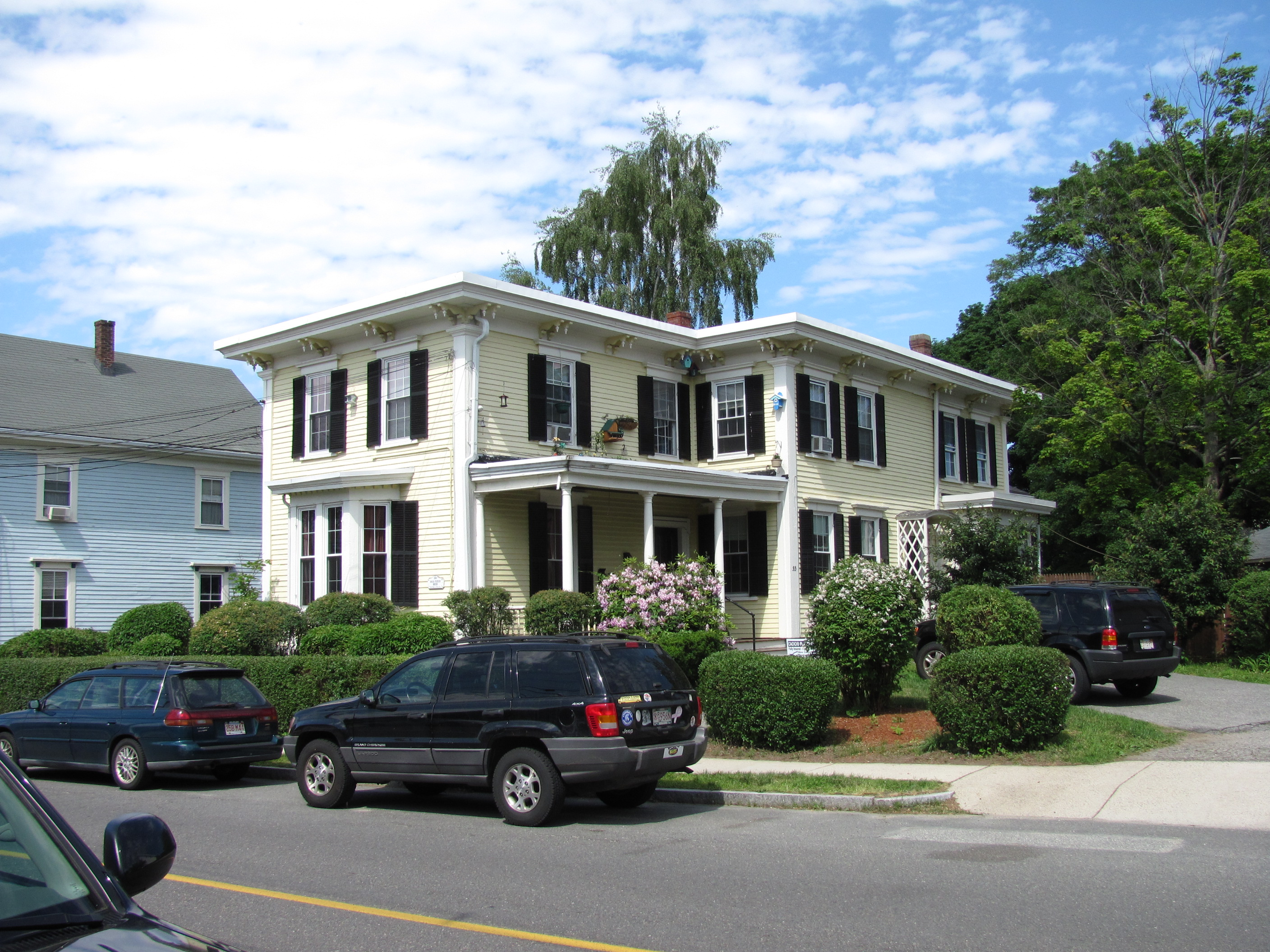
- Amasa Farrier House

- Location within Massachusetts Location within the United States
- Location: 55 Central St., Stoneham, Massachusetts
- Coordinates: 42°28′53″N 71°5′55″W
- Built: 1865
- Architectural style: Italianate
- Part of: Central Square Historic District (ID89002277)
- MPS: Stoneham MRA
- NRHP reference No.: 84002605

Significant dates
- Added to NRHP: April 13, 1984
- Designated CP: January 17, 1990

The Amasa Farrier House is a historic house at 55 Central Street in Stoneham, Massachusetts. Built c. 1865, this two-story wood-frame house is a well-preserved Italianate villa, with pilastered corner boards and a nearly flat roof with a deep overhanging cornice studded with paired brackets. The house was built for Amasa Farrier, the town's surveyor and landscape designer.

The house was listed on the National Register of Historic Places in 1984, and is a contributing resource to the 1990 Central Square Historic District.

== See also ==
- Amasa Farrier Boardinghouse, a rental property owned by Farrier
- National Register of Historic Places listings in Stoneham, Massachusetts
- National Register of Historic Places listings in Middlesex County, Massachusetts
