= Kick Buttowski: Suburban Daredevil =

American animated television series

- Genre: Action-adventure; Comedy; Animated sitcom
- Created by: Sandro Corsaro
- Directed by: Chris Savino; Sherm Cohen (S1); Clay Morrow (S2)
- Voices of: Charlie Schlatter; Matt Jones; Danny Cooksey
- Theme music composer: Andy Sturmer; James Childs
- Opening theme: "Kick Buttowski!" by Andy Sturmer
- Ending theme: "Kick Buttowski!" (Instrumental)
- Composer: Andy Sturmer
- Country of origin: United States
- Original language: English
- No. of seasons: 2
- No. of episodes: 52 (103 segments) (list of episodes)

Production
- Executive producers: Chris Savino (S1); Sandro Corsaro (S2)
- Producer: Chris Savino (S2)
- Animator: Mercury Filmworks
- Editors: Julie Anne Lau; Joseph Molinari
- Running time: 22 minutes
- Production company: Disney Television Animation

Original release
- Network: Disney XD (United States); Disney Channel (Worldwide)
- Release: February 13, 2010 – December 2, 2012

Kick Buttowski: Suburban Daredevil is an American animated television series created by Sandro Corsaro. It was produced by Disney Television Animation, and debuted on February 13, 2010. Premiering exactly one year after the launch of Disney XD, it was the fourth Disney XD original series and the first animated series for the network.

The second season premiered on April 30, 2011. The show's episodes consist of two 11-minute segments, with 52 episodes produced in total over two seasons. The series concluded on December 2, 2012.

== Plot ==
The show follows a young boy named Clarence Francis "Kick" Buttowski who aspires to become the world's greatest daredevil with the help of his loyal friend, Gunther.

== Characters ==
"Our big challenge was finding a voice for the character that can sustain a lot of stories, through numerous episodes," explained Coleman. "We want to look at the characters far beyond a TV show, as a new character in the canon of Disney characters and find the right balance between comedy and action. One of the things that we are excited about is the fact that it's a total brand fit for us. It's a great companion piece for our hit show Phineas and Ferb—and has some of the same underlying themes of friendship and determination."

— Animation Magazine

=== Main ===
- Clarence Francis "Kick" Buttowski (voiced by Charlie Schlatter) is a 10-year-old amateur, thrill-seeking, often reckless daredevil. His main goal in life is to embrace each day as if it were his own personal action movie. He embraces his persona to the point taking opportunities and disregarding his wellbeing. Despite this, he otherwise has a good heart, and always does the right thing in the end if his reckless behavior goes too far. He is skilled at stunt work despite his age, though some of his stunts backfire. He is rather short and wears a signature daredevil outfit: a white jumpsuit with red stripes down the sleeves, a white helmet with a red stripe, and yellow boots and gloves. Some of his more notable catchphrases are "It's show time", "Fail? I don't do fail," "Aw, biscuits," "That's a rat", and "Chimichanga". He is the middle child in his family. His middle name was announced in "Rank of Awesome", as a reference to his original name, Francis Little. He is picked on by his older brother, Brad Buttowski, who often refers to him as "dillweed". He has 3 arch-rivals: Kendall Perkins, Ronaldo, and Gordie Gibble.
- Gunther Magnuson (voiced by Matt Jones) is Kick's 11-year-old best friend and stunt coordinator who is chunky, skeptical, kindhearted, worrisome, and easily distracted by shiny objects. It is also shown that Gunther can whistle very well. Gunther, unlike Kick, does not enjoy living on the edge and can drink large amounts of Cheetah Chug without getting sick. He has Viking ethnic heritage and his family owns a successful restaurant. His Viking side shows when Gunther gets serious or angry. Anyone (except Kick) can be intimidated at this side of the character. He wears blue shorts and a shirt with a red cap and orange Crocs.

=== Recurring ===
- Bradley "Brad" Buttowski (voiced by Danny Cooksey) is Kick's 15-year-old older brother. He bullies and insults Kick and Gunther, and is in charge when their parents are away. Brad also has poor personal hygiene and thinks he is popular. His favorite phrase is "dillweed", which he uses to refer to Kick and "Yeah, Brad", which is his catchphrase. He is a self-proclaimed "ladies' man" and will try to woo women. He usually fails in this goal. He has lackeys, who sometimes do his bidding or achieve his goals such as bullying Kick and Gunther. He is good at manipulating people, especially his parents, to get out or get people in trouble. His manipulations backfire at times.
- Brianna Buttowski (voiced by Grey DeLisle) is Kick's spoiled 7-year-old younger sister. She's mainly known for being a "pageant girl". Being the youngest, she usually gets her way by saying "I want..." When not participating in pageants, she likes to annoy her brother Kick, holding on to anything that's valuable to him, like his favorite cereal and tricycle. Unlike their eldest brother Brad, she seems to have mutual respect for Kick. She is capable at working with him, provided that it is on her own terms. She appears to dislike Brad. Her favorite show is Teena Sometimes, which is why she is always dressed like its main character.
- Harold Buttowski (voiced by Brian Stepanek) is Kick's overcautious and neurotic father. He is usually cheery and easygoing but is also attentive about possible sources of danger. He also has an unhealthy love for his 1979 AMC Pacer Wagon, calling it "Monique", and his wife does the same by calling her car "Antonio". He is obsessed with his wife's homemade cookies to the point of harming or bribing anyone who gets in his way. He seems to enjoy opening letters. He was a master at ping pong when he was growing up, as shown in "Bad Table Manners".
- Honey Buttowski (voiced by Kari Wahlgren) is Kick's mother. She is infrequently at home, as she and her husband take their daughter Brianna to compete in beauty pageants. She is caring and protective of Kick, and although she's often worried about him, she acknowledges his daredevil nature, sometimes even helping him with his stunts. In "Kickin' Genes" it is revealed that she was once a famous daredevil and speedboat racer called "Honey Splash". She gave up her life as a daredevil when she became pregnant. It is also shown that she was the one who gave Kick his trademark white jumpsuit as a present, to show him how much she supports him. Her home baked cookies are tasty, to the point of driving people crazily obsessed and wanting more, even herself.
- Secret Spy Buttowski (voiced by Ed O'Neill) is Kick's grandfather. He was a spy who spied on a military general to beat and stop his evil plan in "Truth or Daredevil".
- CEO of Food 'n' Fix (voiced by Jeffrey Tambor) is Wade's chief in "Wade Against The Machine", in which he makes his first and only appearance. He is the CEO of the parent company that owns the Food 'n' Fix service station where Wade works. He is very naive, as he promotes Wade for actions that are not useful to the company, yet these things are what Kick and Wade are doing to try and get Wade demoted back to his old job. At the end of the episode he even promotes a turtle, because the turtle walks slowly and he says, "We move way too fast around here. Promotion!".
- Wade (voiced by Eric Christian Olsen) is a gas station worker and is friends with Kick. In "Stumped", Wade supplies Kick with Cheetah Chug, in hopes of finding a key. The key was a free ticket for Kick to see his favorite monster truck star, Billy Stumps. He is very calm and commonly clumsy, to the point of forgetting what he was previously doing.
- Billy Stumps (voiced by Jeff Bennett) is an extreme daredevil who is famous, and one of Kick's idols. He is missing his left hand for unknown reasons, presumably from one of his stunts. He appears as a cameo in a poster by Kick's door. He helped re-inspire Kick to do stunts when he lost his helmet (thanks to a call from Gunther in "Exposed!") with his standard "been there, done that" experience. He is always seen with his favorite hood ornament, a golden horseshoe.
- Magnus Magnuson (voiced by Clancy Brown) and Helga Magnuson (voiced by April Winchell) are Gunther's parents. They own a BMW Isetta and a restaurant called "BattleSnax". They are Vikings, lived in the Nordic country and are shown to have a deep friendship with the Buttowski Family.
- Bjørgen (voiced by Danny Jacobs) is Gunther's uncle. He works at BattleSnax and often says words that rhyme with his name. He can speak regular English in later episodes. He is a Viking and lived in the Nordic country.
- Announcer (voiced by Jess Harnell)
- Teena Sometimes (voiced by Tiffany Thornton) is the star of her self-titled show, which was first mentioned in "Stumped!". She is a part-time spy and a part-time princess. She is also a singer. Her catchphrases are "I'll sparkle you until next week," and "Consider yourself sometimes!"
- Principal Henry (voiced by Henry Winkler) is the principal of Mellowbrook Elementary School who loathes doing paperwork and isn't entirely bothered by Kick's antics, as long as he graduates. This is made apparent in "Frame Story".
- Walter (voiced by Jeff Bennett) works at the Food 'n' Fix when Wade is promoted. He also works at a flower shop in Mellowbrook in "A Very Buttowski Mother's Day".
- Kendall Perkins (voiced by Emily Osment) is Kick and Gunther's classmate, one of Kick's arch-rivals, and, as revealed in "Kick or Treat", one of Kick's next-door neighbors. She loves learning and is the president of her class (former as of "Poll Position"). However, she is also apparently bossy, arrogant, selfish, and high-strung and has few friends. She and Kick both claim to hate each other, but they also serve as each other's love interest. She typically refers to Kick as Clarence, his first name.
- Mr. Perkins (voiced by Charlie Schlatter) is Kendall's father, who is an actuary and makes his first speaking appearance in "Father From The Truth" and second in "Crumbs!", while the rest of his appearances are non-speaking cameos.
- Mr. Vickle (voiced by John DiMaggio) is Kick's next-door neighbor. A heavyset middle-aged bachelor with an effeminate personality, he's one of the few adults who isn't ruffled by Kick's behavior, with the exception of his appearances in "Kick the Habit" and "Nerves of Steal".
- Jock Wilder (voiced by James Arnold Taylor) is one of Kick's daredevil idols and the founder of "Jock Wilder's Nature Camp". As a child, he was raised in the wilderness by wolves. He loves the untamed outdoors and is often ready to "dive into nature and face a fiery fury".
- Larry Wilder (voiced by Jim Parsons) is the brother of Jock Wilder and co-camp master of Jock Wilder's Nature Camp. Unlike his brother, who was raised in the wild by wolves, Larry was raised by chihuahuas.
- Scarlett Rosetti (voiced by Alyssa Milano) is the female counterpart of Kick Buttowski. She makes her first and only speaking appearance in "And... Action!". She is originally Teena's stunt double in the show Teena Sometimes but later becomes Scarlet Letter, Teena's nemesis.
- "Wacky" Jackie Wackerman (voiced by Maria Bamford) is a humorous and hyperactive resident of Mellowbrook. She became obsessed with Kick in her debut appearance in "Obsession: For Kick", later stalking him due to her being his "number one fan", as well as being the president of his fan club.
- Glenn (also known as Clerk) (voiced by Brian Doyle-Murray) is a grocery store worker. Whenever Kick shows up in the Mellowmart grocery store, he is sure Kick will wreck "his store", leading to trouble for Glenn.
- Janelle (voiced by Kari Wahlgren) is a cashier at the Mellow*Mart, and she likes to fool Brad.
- Pantsy (voiced by Harland Williams) is one of Brad's friends and Mouth's older brother. Like Brad, he bullies his little brother, Mouth. He is also the assistant manager of the Mellowbrook Megaplex and has a strict policy when it comes to patrons. He usually wears 3D glasses.
- Horace (voiced by Greg Cipes) is Brad's other friend. He has green hair that covers his face. It is revealed in "Kicked Out" that he's not all that smart.
- Christopher "Mouth" (voiced by Richard Steven Horvitz) is Kick and Gunther's frenemy and classmate. He is the son of the 2nd assistant security guard at Mellowbrook Mall and is also Pantsy's younger brother. He schemes a lot and he loves playing shuffleboard. It is shown in "Detained" that he can get a hold of anything. He idolizes Rock Callahan along with Kick and Gunther (as shown in "Box Office Blitz").
- Coach Sternbeck (voiced by Mike Golic) is a Kick's personal trainer in "Gym Dandy".
- Ms. Dominic (voiced by Veronica Cartwright) is a gym teacher in Mellowbrook Elementary School.
- Ms. Fitzpatrick (voiced by Roz Ryan) is Kick's teacher that stays in his face. Her catchphrase is "Mmmm-hmmm", which is also on her license plate. She often calls Kick, Mr. Buttowski.
- The Librarian (voiced by Susanne Blakeslee) is the librarian at Mellowbrook Elementary School. She's brutal, just like Ms. Chicarelli (but even worse), and tries to kill Kick in "If Books Could Kill". She is shown to be power-hungry and claims anything put in the library return box as hers, including a book belonging to Kick and even a sandwich Gunther dropped. She makes a second speaking appearance in "Shh!" when Kick goes to the library with a Nuzzlet he has to study. She threatens to kill Kick if he wakes her from her nap, but when she wakes up she thinks Ronaldo is the one responsible for destroying the library. Because of this, she tries to kill him with a laser, in a reference to the James Bond film Goldfinger.
- Charlotte Chicarelli (voiced by Mindy Sterling) is one of Kick's next-door neighbors. She always tattles on Kick and the other kids on the cul-de-sac for causing any kind of disruption.
- Oskar is Charlotte Chicarelli's dog. He enjoys biting Kick's buttocks and chasing him. Kick and Oskar have a mutual hate for each other, though in "Dog Gone" they show mutual respect and a liking for each other, and a brothers-from-a-different-mother bond.
- Ronaldo (voiced by Simon Helberg) is Kick and Gunther's classmate, and another of Kick's arch-rivals whose first appearance is in "Mellowbrook Drift". He is a physics-obsessed bully who cheats in the Tri-County Cartacular by following the laws of physics. His jacket is somewhat similar to Kick's jumpsuit, only with opposite colors; maroon with yellow stripes down the sleeves and a small cape in the back. He hangs around a small posse of other nerds and goes to Kick's school.
- Rodney "Rock" Callahan (voiced by Kevin Michael Richardson) is one of Kick and Gunther's many idols. He is also an actor whose catch phrase is "Let's rock!", which he says while cracking his neck.
- Cousin Kyle (voiced by Tom Kenny) is Kick Buttowski's cousin. He is a chatterbox and is also extremely dim-witted. In "Kyle Be Back," he gets in Kick's way from doing a record-breaking stunt. In "Kyle 2.0" it is revealed that he can create radio static just by being near it. Kyle is also a huge fan of Kick.
- Papercut Peterson (voiced by Carl Faruolo) is a professional wrestler who helped Kick defeat Brad in "Drop Kick". He used to be known as Pile-Driver Peterson. He also won the Battle of the Bands by Auto-Tune. He appears in many episodes, although is never displayed as a wrestler but as an unhygienic, lonely man. He also often humorously refers to Gunther as being a 'little girl'. He has a lookalike in the Old Country, where Gunther and his family are from. His relation to this lookalike is unknown.
- Shogun Sanchez (voiced by Carlos Alazraqui) is the older brother of Papercut Peterson who only appears as one of two main antagonists (along Brad) in "Drop Kick".
- One-Eyed Jackson (voiced by Adam Carolla) is an old man who helps Kick and Gunther win a race against Ronaldo in "Mellowbrook Drift". He was formerly a professional kart racer until an accident on Turn 6, a deadly turn on Mount Hurtsmore. The show's creator, Sandro Corsaro, has revealed that he is a ghost. This is supported by the fact that he disappears in front of Kick and Gunther after the race in "Mellowbrook Drift", and again in front of Kick after paying him for mowing his lawn in "Mow Money".
- Boom McCondor (voiced by Brian Vanholt) is one of the best stunt legends in the world. He had his first contest which Kick and Brad won in "Things That Make You Go Boom!". He usually has a catchphrase similar to a bird call.
- Emo Kid (voiced by Greg Cipes) is a classmate of Kick and Gunther's and the son of Rowdy Remington. He dresses in black and purple and his hair is partly dyed purple. He makes his first appearance in "Snowpocalypse". He is known to have a strong dislike for dodgeball. He doesn't speak much, but when he does, he has somewhat of an Eastern European or Mediterranean accent.
- Janitor Roberson (voiced by Fred Tatasciore) is a janitor at Mellowbrook Elementary School.
- Gordon "Gordie" Gibble (voiced by Will Forte) is Kick's archenemy and (former) BMX legend who broke records after Kick won the BMX Rodeo. After his loss, he went into kart racing and other sports. He is from West Mellowbrook. He has a rich father, made apparent in "Kart to Kart".
- Penelope Patterson (voiced by Jessica DiCicco) is Brianna Buttowski's pageant rival. Her major talents involve balancing objects, riding a unicycle, and reciting Shakespeare all at the same time. In "Sister Pact", she tries to sabotage Brianna's audition for the Poise Posse but fails and is kicked out of the group.
- The DiPazzi Twins (both voiced by Sandro Corsaro) are named Michael Anthony and Anthony Michael. They appear identical except for different eyes and voices. They first appeared on "Clothes Call", and again along with Gordon on "Switching Gears".
- Madison (voiced by Skai Jackson) is one of Brianna's friends. Madison is a cheerful African-American girl, who always say "Yay". Just like Brianna, she's a huge fan of Teena Sometimes and dressed up like the main character of the show.
- Abbie (voiced by Doug Brochu) is Brianna's other friend. Abby is physically robust and speaks with a unusually masculine voice. She also has a crush on Gunther. Just like Brianna and Madison, she's a huge fan of Teena Sometimes and dressed up like the main character of the show.

== Episodes ==
Season	Segments	Episodes	Originally released	
Season	Segments	Episodes	First released	Last released
1	40	20	February 13, 2010	November 25, 2010
2	63	32	April 30, 2011	December 2, 2012

== Production ==
=== Development ===
Corsaro has stated that he was thinking about his own childhood when he drew the character in 2002 and subsequently began developing the idea for a TV series. Originally named Kid Knievel, Kick was renamed for legal reasons and slightly redesigned from his initial concept. He was much smaller. He had blue stars on his helmet and blue stripes on his clothing in an apparent homage to Evel Knievel. Many of the show's characters and locations were inspired by Corsaro's hometown of Stoneham, Massachusetts.

Kick Buttowski: Suburban Daredevil started production on December 19, 2008, under the name Kid Knievel. The title was changed to Kick Buttowski on April 4, 2009. In early December 2009, it was announced that the series would premiere on February 13, 2010, exactly one year after the launch of Disney XD (replacement of Jetix and Toon Disney), and the premiere of its first original series, Aaron Stone. The series's stunt coordinator is Robbie Knievel, the son of Evel Knievel.

The pilot was written and developed by Devin Bunje and Nick Stanton, who eventually left the project to work on another Disney XD series, Zeke and Luther. The pilot was later split into the first two episodes of the series, "Dead Man's Drop" and "Stumped".

==== Full production ====
In January 2010, it was announced that the series would debut on Disney XD on February 13, 2010, premiering exactly one year after the launch of Disney XD, with two episodes airing on the first day.

In June 2010, Disney XD ordered a second season for the spring of 2011. In March 2011, it was announced that second season would premiere on April 30.

=== Animation ===
Animation for the show was made in Toon Boom Animation software by Mercury Filmworks, with some 3D-animated elements.

== Broadcast ==
Kick Buttowski: Suburban Daredevil had been set to air in November 2009, but Disney announced it would instead air in February 2010. The show debuted on Disney XD on February 13, 2010 at 8:30 A.M. ET with two episodes airing that day. Sneak peeks and promos were shown on Disney XD, DisneyXD.com and Disney Channel. The series sometimes aired Saturday mornings at 8:30 A.M. on Disney XD.

On April 2, 2010, the series first aired on Disney Channel as a special presentation, with the episode "Obsession: For Kick / Flush and Release" as part of the "Get Animated" marathon. Another presentation was shown on Disney Channel on May 22, 2010, featuring three episodes.

On June 18, 2011, Kick Buttowski was moved to an off-and-on spot on Disney Channel with its incorporation into Toonin' Saturdays, Disney Channel's new Saturday morning cartoon block. The show last aired on Disney Channel on December 25, 2011.

In November 2012, Disney XD announced that Kick Buttowski had been cancelled and it would air its final episode on December 2. Various episodes were broadcast in different timeslots, likely causing low ratings and leading to the show's cancellation. Sandro Corsaro posted a video on his YouTube channel announcing the show's cancellation. The series finale "Last Fan Standing" aired on December 2, 2012. However, after the show's cancellation, reruns still aired on Disney XD until 2024.

The entire series is available to watch on Disney+, with the episodes placed in their proper production order.

== Reception ==
=== Viewership ===
The pilot episode, "Dead Man's Drop/Stumped", was watched by 842,000 viewers, the second highest-rated series premiere in Disney XD's history. The second episode, "If Books Could Kill/There Will Be Nachos", was watched by 972,000 viewers.

=== Critical reception ===
The series received mixed reviews from critics, but has received a more positive reception from audiences and has gathered a cult following over time for its characters, writing, humor, and action. Emily Ashby of Common Sense Media gave the show 1 out of 5 stars, saying that "this pointless cartoon totally misses the mark for kids", arguing that "Kick lives in a fantasy world where responsibility and respect for authority take a backseat to danger and adventure, and his risky actions never result in any physical harm or discipline, as they would in real life. His older brother bullies him with name-calling and teasing, and Kick treats his best friend with similar disrespect."

A website of Toonopolis gave 2 out of 5 Giant Cartoon Mallets, writing: "My initial feel for this show was not a positive one. The show itself is a little annoying to watch, especially in the world of prominent flash animation on the Internet. Creator Sandro Corsaro is known for his preference for Flash and the show definitely feels like it was drawn in Flash. It might be unique in a way for usage in a mainstream show, but it feels a little amateurish to me." He argued that Kick and Gunther "aren't really funny as a pair. And the rest of the characters don't bring a lot to the table." He also said "It definitely has an air of 'figuring it out as we go'... another staple of Western animation. It isn't necessarily a bad thing, but it definitely explains why so many of the characters have no real depth. Because it isn't completely unwatchable... just mostly."

== See also ==
- Wild Grinders
- Rocket Power
