= List of Kick Buttowski: Suburban Daredevil episodes =

Kick Buttowski: Suburban Daredevil is an American animated television series created by Sandro Corsaro and produced by Disney Television Animation that premiered on February 13, 2010 until present. As of November 6, 2010, the first season was completed. Each episode is 11 minutes and 2 episodes show in one premiere. A premiere is 22 mins.

On June 7, 2010, the series was renewed for a second and final season, which started airing on April 30, 2011. Halfway through the second season, an additional six episodes were ordered.

The show aired its final episodes on December 2, 2012.

== Series overview ==
Season	Segments	Episodes	Originally released	
Season	Segments	Episodes	First released	Last released
1	40	20	February 13, 2010	November 25, 2010
2	63	32	April 30, 2011	December 2, 2012

== Episodes ==
=== Season 1 (2010) ===
No. overall	No. in season	Title	Directed by	Written by	Storyboard by	Original release date
1	1	"Dead Man's Drop"	Chris Savino	Written by : Nate Knetchel and Chris Savino; Story by : Sandro Corsaro and Devin Bunje & Nick Stanton	Carl Faruolo	February 13, 2010
1	1	"Stumped"	Chris Savino	Written by : Chris Savino and David Shayne; Story by : Sandro Corsaro and Devin Bunje & Nick Stanton	Mike Kunkel	February 13, 2010
Young rebellious daredevil, Kick, keeps trying to show everyone that he can beat Dead Man's Drop ramp. The only barrier that is in his way is his older brother Brad, who wants to keep him inside the house so he could take another driver's test. Kick misses Billy Stumps' show, his favorite daredevil, at the local mall, and he gets a chance to ride shotgun with Billy at the next show by finding the key with the help of Gunther and Wade, owner of the local Food 'n' Fix.
2	2	"If Books Could Kill"	Chris Savino	Nate Knetchel	Troy Adomitis and Mike Kunkel	February 13, 2010
2	2	"There Will Be Nachos"	Chris Savino	John Derevlany and David Shayne	Bob Camp	February 13, 2010
Kick has an autographed copy of a book by his idol Billy Stumps which Gunther mistakenly returns to the library. Kick does whatever he can to get it back even though the librarian won't listen to them. With their parents out of town, Brad throws a party at the house, which Kick is not allowed to attend. This does not stop Kick and Gunther from trying to get into the party to score some of Senor Brad's "famous" nachos.
3	3	"Kicked Out"	Chris Savino	Mitch Larson	Carl Faruolo	February 20, 2010
3	3	"Kick the Habit"	Chris Savino and Sherm Cohen	David Shayne	Mike Kunkel	February 20, 2010
Kick performs another dangerous stunt and falls off a cliff with Gunther, finding and creating an awesome hangout, which Brad and his friends kick them out of, which has Kick and Gunther repeatedly trying to retake from them. Facing the risk of being sent to military school, Kick sets out to prove to his concerned parents (and the neighborhood), that he can refrain from performing any stunts for an entire day, despite Brad and the neighbors wanting to ensure Kick will succumb to temptation.
4	4	"Knocked Out"	Chris Savino	Mitch Larson and David Shayne	Clay Morrow	February 27, 2010
4	4	"Not Without My Cereal"	Chris Savino	Written by : Nate Knetchel; Story by : Miguel Becerra	Ed Baker	February 27, 2010
Kick plans to launch his career on a talent show, but before the show starts, Gunther accidentally knocks him out. Can Gunther wake up Kick before it's too late? Kick has to watch his sister, Brianna, while waiting in the grocery line, in order to get his favorite cereal. But when Brianna runs off with some cereal, he has to bring her back without his mom finding out or seeing him or Brianna. What's worse is that a grocery worker is watching Kick, waiting for him to mess up.
5	5	"Kickasaurus Wrecks"	Chris Savino	Mitch Larson	Troy Adomitis	March 6, 2010
5	5	"Battle For The Snax"	Chris Savino	Written by : David Shayne; Story by : Mitch Larson and David Shayne	Phillip Mosness	March 6, 2010
Tired of being called "Shrimp", Kick declares that he will do something big. When given his chance, the resulting disaster deals Kick another chance, by being the best "shrimp" ever. Kick tries to help Gunther's family get business at their restaurant, FØÖD, because if he doesn't, Gunther and his family have to move back to the "Old Country". He helps them put back in business by creating the most awesome restaurant in Mellowbrook, the BattleSnax!
6	6	"Obsession For Kick"	Chris Savino	Nick Confalone	Bob Camp	March 13, 2010
6	6	"Flush and Release"	Chris Savino	Written by : David Shayne; Story by : Mitch Larson	Scott O'Brien	March 13, 2010
A new girl in the neighborhood named Jackie Wackerman sees Kick performing a stunt and immediately claims to be his #1 fan. Gunther tries to warn Kick that Jackie is crazy, but Kick doesn't believe him. A while later, she starts to disturb his stunts and Kick finally sees that Jackie is crazy. With Gunther's help, he creates a lie to make her stop following him and make his life return to normal, but the question is does it work? Kick and Gunther seek a legendary giant goldfish which Kick plans to harness for the ultimate wave-boarding experience with the help of their neighbor Mr. Vickle.
7	7	"Snowpocalypse!"	Chris Savino and Sherm Cohen	Written by : Mark Drop; Story by : David Shayne	Mike Kunkel	March 20, 2010
7	7	"According to Chimp"	Chris Savino	Written by : Mark Drop; Story by : Adam Beechen	Carl Faruolo	March 20, 2010
Kick and Gunther, with the help of Wade, set out to rescue students stranded on a school bus in a snowstorm, while Kendall, the class president, tries to take control over the situation. Guest Star: Emily Osment as Kendall Kick adopts an escaped chimp, which he names Dr. Awesome, but has to keep it a secret due to his bad track record of keeping pets. Trouble soon erupts when the zoo's other chimps escape, presumably in search of Dr. Awesome, their leader, and cause mania throughout the cul-de-sac.
8	8	"Runaway Recital"	Chris Savino	Written by : Mitch Larson; Story by : Bart Jennett	Scott O'Brien	March 27, 2010
8	8	"Trike X-5"	Chris Savino	David Shayne	Phillip Mosness	March 27, 2010
Harold, Kick's father forces Kick to take piano lessons, which leads to Kick's another wild escape. Brianna steals Kick's beloved first stunt bike, which she ultimately uses to compete in a pageant party to beat her pageant rival, Penelope Patterson. Guest Star: Jessica DiCicco as Penelope Patterson
9	9	"Drop Kick"	Chris Savino and Sherm Cohen	Nick Confalone	Carl Faruolo	May 1, 2010
9	9	"Box Office Blitz"	Chris Savino and Sherm Cohen	Tony Mosher	Tony Craig	May 1, 2010
Tired of being bullied by Brad, Kick decides to train with a former champion wrestler. But when he learns that his new mentor Papercut Peterson has bullying issues of his own, Kick must prove to his new teacher that every underdog has their day. When Pantsy, the assistant manager of the Multiplex bans Kick from seeing a movie featuring his favorite daredevil movie star, Kick won't rest until he sneaks into the heavily guarded theater and sees Rock Callahan's "Zombie Motocross."
10	10	"Those Who Camp, Do"	Chris Savino and Sherm Cohen	Nick Confalone, Derek Dressler, Mark Drop and David Shayne	Bob Camp	May 8, 2010
10	10	"Dog Gone"	Chris Savino and Sherm Cohen	David Shayne	Tony Craig and Scott O'Brien	May 8, 2010
Kick is stoked to be going on an overnight camping trip, since he hopes to "become a man". However, there is an obstacle, the "rustic campsite", is too civilized for his liking. After that false start, Kick and Brad have a true test to complete. Absent: Gunther Kick is roped into dog-sitting Oskar while his mom and Oskar's owner, Ms. Chicarelli go play shuffleboard. But when his reckless actions get Oskar locked in the dog pound, Kick must come to his rescue or he will be "grounded for life."
11	11	"Dad's Car"	Chris Savino and Sherm Cohen	Written by : Clay Morrow; Story by : David Shayne	Clay Morrow	May 15, 2010
11	11	"The Treasure of Dead Man Dave"	Chris Savino and Sherm Cohen	Nick Confalone and Derek Dressler	Robb Pratt	May 15, 2010
Kick and Brad are watching their dad's car, "Monique." While horsing around, Kick notices a scratch on the passenger side door, which Brad immediately tries to blame on Kick. Rather than be grounded, Kick decides to fix it himself, while Gunther runs interference. Gunther must keep Brad and Kick's dad detained while all 3 are at the hospital, due to an encounter with a swarm of angry bees on Brad. It's oral report day in Kick's class. He chooses one of his heroes, Dead Man Dave, as the subject of his presentation. His wild tale, of seeking the lost skateboard of Dave, is met with disbelief from his classmates, as well as the teacher.
12	12	"For The Love of Gunther"	Chris Savino	Written by : Carl Faruolo; Story by : Derek Dressler	Carl Faruolo	May 22, 2010
12	12	"Father From the Truth"	Chris Savino and Sherm Cohen	Written by : Mike Kunkel; Story by : Nick Confalone	Mike Kunkel	May 22, 2010
When Gunther discovers he has a lot in common with Wacky Jackie, he's bitten by the "love bug," but Jackie doesn't even know he exists. Kick must help Gunther "get the girl" when all she truly "loves" is a daredevil. Kick dreads "Bring your father to school day", as he fears his dad would be too lame, thereby earning his son, much shame, in the eyes of his peers. Kick must get his "square dad", Wade, to become "more cool" before Monday.
13	13	"Exposed"	Chris Savino and Sherm Cohen	Written by : Mitch Larson; Story by : Derek Dressler	Troy Adomitis	June 21, 2010
13	13	"Wade Against The Machine"	Chris Savino and Sherm Cohen	Derek Dressler	Clay Morrow	June 21, 2010
Kick loses his helmet, and shocked by the loss of his sign, he decides to quit becoming a daredevil, which makes quite hard. When Wade is promoted in the Food 'n' Fix and has moved out from the store in the company, Kick and Gunther try to un-promote Wade so that they can be best buds again. But their attempts to get Wade demoted only get him promoted even more.
14	14	"Mellowbrook Drift"	Chris Savino and Sherm Cohen	Nick Confalone, Mark Drop and Derek Dressler	Edgar Karapetyan, Ed Baker and Phillip Mosness	June 21, 2010
14	14	"The Gift of Wacky"	Chris Savino and Sherm Cohen	Written by : Bob Camp and Derek Dressler; Story by : Mitch Larson	Bob Camp	June 21, 2010
Kick challenges a physics-obsessed street racing crew, led by bullying nerd Ronaldo in a winner-takes-all race on Mt. Hurtsmore which pits the laws of physics against the "laws of awesome". To defeat the competition, Kick and Gunther turn to school woodshop teacher One-Eyed Jackson, a legendary go-cart racer, for help. Guest Stars: Simon Helberg as Ronaldo and Adam Carolla as One-Eyed Jackson. Kick is invited to Wacky Jackie's birthday party, in the middle of a stunt, so Kick decides to get rid of her forever, since she wreaked a once in a lifetime stunt. Kick makes a deal with Brad, who promises to help find a gift for Jackie's birthday, at the cost of his room. When Kick sees he is the only guest at her party, he decides to throw her the most awesome party ever, the only thing he forgot about is... the present, now becomes the question as per Jackie's reaction to Kick's present.
15	15	"Things That Make You Go Boom!"	Chris Savino	Written by : Derek Dressler; Story by : Jonathan Howard	Clay Morrow, Howie Perry, Heather Martinez and Sherm Cohen	August 9, 2010
15	15	"Kyle Be Back"	Chris Savino and Sherm Cohen	Written by : Derek Dressler and Clay Morrow; Story by : Sandro Corsaro	Clay Morrow	August 9, 2010
Kick and Brad battle to win a trip to Hawaii for the "Stunt That Ends All Stunts" with Boom McCondor, Kick is determined to win the chance to do the "Stunt That Ends All Stunts" but the problem is Brad has his habit of cheating, will Kick be able to do the stunt? Kick's annoying cousin Kyle visits and ruins Kick's attempts at the most important stunt that could launch his career, so Kick and Gunther try to get rid of him, but the question is how? Guest Stars: Tom Kenny as Kyle, Brian Van Holt as Boom McCondor, and Leigh-Allyn Baker as Sally
16	16	"Rank of Awesome"	Chris Savino and Sherm Cohen	Mitch Larson and Derek Dressler	Robb Pratt	October 2, 2010
16	16	"A Very Buttowski Mother's Day"	Chris Savino	David Shayne	Scott O'Brien and Howie Perry	October 2, 2010
Gunther shows Kick a website where the users ranks the most awesome videos. So Kick does a lot of stunts to be on the top position, but he has to compete with Kendall for it. Kick and Brad have a sibling rivalry on Mother's Day, so they compete against one another to make a Mother's Day breakfast of eggs, bacon & orange juice for their mother to satisfy her, and Harold also enters the competition as well.
17	17	"Abandon Friendship!"	Chris Savino and Sherm Cohen	Derek Dressler and Nick Confalone	Phillip Mosness	October 23, 2010
17	17	"Braking The Grade"	Chris Savino and Sherm Cohen	Written by : Scott O'Brien; Story by : David Shayne	Scott O'Brien	October 23, 2010
Kick and Gunther search for new best friends when they fear their friendship is ending, this is because their families have argued over Kick's stunts. Kick tries to hide his report card from his dad long enough to attend a demolition derby. The only obstacle in his way is Brad who is bent and determined on having their dad see Kick's report card.
18	18	"Dancing With The Enemy"	Chris Savino and Sherm Cohen	Nick Confalone	Robb Pratt and Troy Adomitis	October 30, 2010
18	18	"Tattler's Tale"	Chris Savino	Written by : Mitch Larson; Story by : Scott Sonneborn	Clay Morrow	October 30, 2010
After a change in class units from Dodge-ball to Dance Appreciation with Mr. Vickle (due to interference from the school nurse) and narrowly avoiding having to dance with Jackie, Kick now has to dance with his arch nemesis, Kendall or he along with her will fail gym class, and have to compete against a captive and unhappy Gunther and an angry and scorned Jackie in a Dance-off. The neighborhood is menaced by old Ms. Chicarelli who is determined to see all troublemakers on the cul-de-sac are punished so she can enjoy the peace. Kick, Brad and the other kids must stop her before they get grounded forever.
19	19	"Morning Rush!"	Chris Savino and Sherm Cohen	Guy Toubes and David Shayne	Scott O'Brien	November 6, 2010
19	19	"Fistful of Ice Cream"	Chris Savino and Sherm Cohen	Written by : Mark Drop and Derek Dressler; Story by : Marty Isenberg and David Shayne	Troy Adomitis and Robb Pratt	November 6, 2010
Kick's "dog ate my homework" excuse is no longer valid and must complete 2 months full of homework in one night. When Oskar actually eats his first copy, he must now do two months' worth of homework questions in less than 6 minutes, or he will fail the class. Kick has to save his dad's birthday when the ice cream truck breaks down, and must prevent a group of 3rd Street Bandits from getting their hands on some extremely rare and delicious ice cream, the Cowboy Kelly Bars. Note: This was first aired in Verizon FiOS On Demand.
20	20	"Frame Story"	Chris Savino	Derek Dressler	Clay Morrow and Heather Martinez	November 25, 2010
20	20	"And... Action!"	Chris Savino	Written by : Derek Dressler; Story by : Sandro Corsaro	Clay Morrow, Howie Perry and Sherm Cohen	November 25, 2010
Kick's principal threatens to expel him if he pulls one more stunt inside the school. Unfortunately the school janitor decides to frame Kick for a crime that wasn't his to begin with, and now Kick must clear his name before it's too late. It is revealed in this episode that Kendall and Ronaldo are in a secret (and as shown in this episode and later episodes, possibly strained) relationship with each other. Kick meets the daredevil stunt double of Teena Sometimes named Scarlett Rosetti. After making her popular, Brianna's favorite TV show is about to be cancelled and now fans of Teena Sometimes hate him, Kick has to find a way to get the show back on, or get the stuffing beaten out of him by rabid Teena Sometimes fans, even Brianna. Guest Stars: Henry Winkler as the Principal, Tiffany Thornton as Teena Sometimes and Alyssa Milano as Scarlett Rosetti

=== Season 2 (2011–12) ===
- Season 2 premiered on April 30, 2011 and ended on December 2, 2012.

No. overall	No. in season	Title	Directed by	Written by	Storyboard by	Original release date
21	1	"Mow Money"	Chris Savino	Written by : Dean Batali; Story by : Sandro Corsaro	Scott O'Brien	April 30, 2011
21	1	"Love Stinks!"	Chris Savino	Written by : Derek Dressler; Story by : Sandro Corsaro and David Shayne	Howie Perry	April 30, 2011
Mow Money: Rock Callahan's coming to Mellowbrook for a big concert and pyrotechnics display, Kick and Gunther's chance to meet their idol has come. Only there's one problem: there is only ONE TICKET LEFT at Wade's store (The Food 'n' Fix) and it's expensive, and neither one can yield the ticket to the other. So to pay for the ticket Kick and Gunther have formed lawn mowing services, and now Kick and Gunther's friendship is really on the line and at stake about meeting Rock Callahan. Will they reach a compromise or will their desire to meet Rock Callahan mentally strain their friendship? Love Stinks!: When Brad gets a new girlfriend, Kelly, Kick soon finds out she is just using him for a cheerleading initiation stunt, which is throwing a huge pile of junk on Brad live on the stage while he is performing a song for her. Can Kick get through to Brad before he is beyond humiliated in front of his entire high school class? Special Guest Star: Dwight Howard as Rock Callahan in "Mow Money"
22	2	"Kickin' Genes"	Chris Savino	Written by : Dave Lewman and Joe Liss; Story by : Nick Boushell and Samuel O'Neal	Chuck Klein	May 7, 2011
22	2	"Clothes Call"	Chris Savino	Patrick Andrew O'Connor and Brendan Duffy	Scott O'Brien	May 7, 2011
Kickin' Genes: Kick and Gunther discover Kick's Mother was a daredevil called Honey Splash. Clothes Call: Kick's mom takes Kick to the mall to buy a suit for his aunt's wedding, and must ensure that the suit his mom picked out is safe and sound.
23	3	"Clean... To The Extreme"	Chris Savino	Patrick Andrew O'Connor	Bob Camp and Troy Adomitis	May 14, 2011
23	3	"Stand and Delivery"	Chris Savino	Derek Dressler	Scott O'Brien	May 14, 2011
Clean... To The Extreme: A famed attraction at the Gnarly Games comes to Mellowbrook. Kick aims to conquer said attraction and enlists Gunther to help him, who is busy with cleaning. When Kick does a stunt to clean the garage, Gunther's dad's foosball table breaks apart when he leans on it during his victory moment, and now he has to do a string of chores to replace it. Stand and Delivery: Kick takes over the delivery at the Battle Snax. But one day when a mysterious individual known only as "The Dark One" breaks the rules for getting free meals, Kick finds out that Ronaldo is the Dark One and must beat him the only way a delivery boy knows how.
24	4	"Switching Gears"	Chris Savino	Derek Dressler	Troy Adomitis	May 21, 2011
24	4	"Garage Banned"	Chris Savino	Written by : Derek Dressler and Carl Faruolo; Story by : Derek Dressler	Carl Faruolo	May 21, 2011
Switching Gears: Kick aims to win the BMX Rodeo but with his own bike stuck in the shop he has no choice but to ride the most baddest untameable bike that ever existed, The Mustang Menace. Can he tame and reign in this bike, or will he go down hard like many riders (even Gordie Gibble) before him? Garage Banned: Kick creates a band in order to beat Brad in the Battle of the Bands so he can gets his garage back from him. After Brad gets under Kick's skin, Kick does a big no-no in a band, and try to force the one set of people who doesn't hate him to play something they have no idea on how to play. Now Kick must get the band back together in time to play or he will lose the garage to Brad along with so much more. Special Guest Stars: Tony Hawk as Hush and Ken Hudson Campbell as Razz in "Switching Gears"
25	5	"Truth or Daredevil"	Chris Savino and Clay Morrow	Derek Dressler	Chuck Klein, Troy Adomitis and Mike Kunkel	June 19, 2011
Kick discovers that his grandfather was a spy. His grandfather tells him all about it. Special Guest Star: Ed O'Neill as Grandpa Buttowski Note: This episode is a half-hour episode.
26	6	"Sold!"	Chris Savino	Derek Dressler	Heather Martinez	June 25, 2011
26	6	"Faceplant!"	Chris Savino	Patrick Andrew O'Connor	Troy Adomitis and Heather Martinez	June 25, 2011
Sold!: When Kick accidentally breaks Gunther's viking clock, he replaces it by spending a day with Jackie. Faceplant!: Faceplant, the impossible obstacle course game show, is what Kick is aiming to win for $50,000! The only problem is that 37 failures has given him a less than desirable reputation and now is forced to seek help from Ronaldo.
27	7	"Stumped Again"	Chris Savino and Clay Morrow	Mark Fellows	Robert Lilly III and Chuck Klein	July 9, 2011
27	7	"The Kick Stays in the Picture"	Chris Savino and Clay Morrow	Derek Dressler and Tom Krajewski	Howie Perry	July 9, 2011
Stumped Again: Kick is torn between two promises to help Gunther and Billy Stumps with their shows at 7:00pm. He's now tasked with a lose-lose situation as per which one of the two events deserves his full attention. The Kick Stays in the Picture: After Jackie ruins another one of Kick's stunts, He discovers a contest for Skidzee's ride shop: the one with the best picture of speed and action gets to be on a billboard. Since Gunther is out one camera the only one they have knowledge of, is in the service, and in the hands of... Jackie.
28	8	"Hand in Hand"	Chris Savino and Clay Morrow	Derek Dressler	Erik Wiese	July 16, 2011
28	8	"Luigi Vendetta"	Chris Savino and Clay Morrow	Derek Dressler	Chris Reccardi and Troy Adomitis	July 16, 2011
Hand in Hand: Kick and Kendall's hands get stuck together due to a rare cave sap, and must get unstuck without being seen together by everyone infamously known for being blabbermouths. Luigi Vendetta: Fed up with Brad's constant bullying, Kick enlists the services of Luigi Vendetta, who promises to "take care of" Brad once and for all. Special Guest Star: Rico Rodriguez as Luigi Vendetta.
29	9	"Pool Daze"	Chris Savino	Patrick Andrew O'Connor	Howie Perry	July 23, 2011
29	9	"Live In Wade"	Chris Savino	Derek Dressler	Carl Faruolo	July 23, 2011
Pool Daze: During a heat wave, Kick and his friends head to the Mellowbrook Community pool. But when lifeguards Shannon (JoAnna Garcia Swisher) and Brad, who has a crush on her (along with Horace and Pantsy as Brad's associates), force Kick and his friends to stay in the kiddie pool, Kick leads his friends in a battle for freedom and fun. Live In Wade: When Wade's stepmom kicks him out of her basement, he is forced to live in the Food 'n' Fix until Kick invites him to move in with the Buttowski's. But Kick quickly discovers that good friends don't always make the best roommates.
30	10	"Kart to Kart"	Chris Savino and Clay Morrow	Derek Dressler	Robert Lilly III and Troy Adomitis	August 6, 2011
30	10	"Kyle 2.0"	Chris Savino and Clay Morrow	Derek Dressler	Scott O'Brien	August 6, 2011
Kart to Kart: Kick can't wait to take a spin around the track at "Go-Go-Go-Kart World", but when Gordie Gibble buys the track, he bans the Buttowski's from the track, thus firing Brad (who happens to work at the track during this episode) in the process. Now to get Brad his job back he must race Gordon Gibble and win. Kyle 2.0: In order to score tickets to Dirt Bike Mike's Demo-Cross, Kick must spend time with Cousin Kyle. But there's one problem: one of Kick's ideas backfires on him when Kyle pretends that Kick doesn't exist.
31	11	"Gym Dandy"	Chris Savino and Clay Morrow	Patrick Andrew O'Connor	Mark Ackland and Riccardo Durante	October 8, 2011
31	11	"Detained"	Chris Savino and Clay Morrow	Patrick Andrew O'Connor	Mark Ackland and Riccardo Durante	October 1, 2011
Gym Dandy: When dodgeball is banned in gym class and is replaced by the fusion of knitting and Yoga (Knit-oga), Kick tries out for the school's sports teams. However, in his quest to become an athlete, he causes some chaos when he has trouble following Coach Sternbeck's rules. Detained: After one too many of the Principal's sandwiches is ruined primarily from Kick's antics, he calls Ms. Chicarelli out of retirement and she becomes the new Vice Principal. She immediately serves Kick and his friends with detention. Kick must team up with some unlikely allies to bring her down and escape detention, including Ronaldo and Kendall.
32	12	"You've Been Brad'd!"	Chris Savino and Clay Morrow	Derek Dressler and Patrick Andrew O'Connor	Erik Wiese and Chuck Klein	October 22, 2011
32	12	"Sleepover"	Chris Savino and Clay Morrow	Dave Lewman and Joe Liss	Chuck Klein and Troy Adomitis	October 15, 2011
You've Been Brad'd!: Kick is trying to get to Skidzees without touching the floor, but he fails multiple times and soon discovers he is a main target for his brother's Internet show "You've Been Brad'd". Sleepover: Brianna and her friends want to watch the Teena Sometimes Marathon but meanwhile, Perseus in Pittsburgh is also on TV and Kick and Gunther will do anything not to miss that movie since it stars their idol: Rock Callahan.
33	13	"Kick or Treat"	Chris Savino and Clay Morrow	Patrick Andrew O'Connor	Mark Ackland, Riccardo Durante and Troy Adomitis	October 24, 2011
33	13	"Dead Man's Roller Coaster"	Chris Savino	Written by : Scott O'Brien; Story by : Derek Dressler	Scott O'Brien	October 24, 2011
Kick or Treat: Kick (who is also joined by Gunther) going to Kendall's party, but Kick is bored and he is challenged Kendall to trick or treat at a house no one has ever gone to: the super creepy and "Haunted" Van Der Deth Mansion. Kick reaches out to all his friends of the party because Kendall got bored everyone (including her boyfriend Ronaldo). Dead Man's Roller Coaster: When Brad and his friends abandon Kick and Gunther in the woods, they discover an abandoned amusement park that may be haunted by the ghost... of Dead Man Dave. Special Guest Star: Debbie Reynolds as Mary Van Der Deth in "Kick or Treat" and David DeLuise as Dead Man Dave in "Dead Man's Roller Coaster"
34	14	"Brad's Room"	Chris Savino and Clay Morrow	Written by : Derek Dressler; Story by : Eric Rivera	Howie Perry	October 29, 2011
34	14	"Dude, Where's My Wade?"	Chris Savino and Clay Morrow	Derek Dressler and Patrick Andrew O'Connor	Heather Martinez and Troy Adomitis	November 5, 2011
Brad's Room: When Kick's room accidentally gets destroyed he's forced to share a bedroom with Brad, now normally that wouldn't be bad, but here's the thing; it was Brad's fault Kick's room was destroyed in the first place. Dude, Where's My Wade?: Wade is missing and it is up Kick and Gunther to unravel a series of bizarre clues to find out where Wade is and return him to work before a crucial health inspection of the Food 'n' Fix. Special Guest Star: J.B. Smoove as Inspector Finecomb in "Dude, Where's My Wade?"
35	15	"Sister Pact"	Chris Savino and Clay Morrow	Patrick Andrew O'Connor, Dave Lewman and Joe Liss	Mike Kunkel and Heather Martinez	November 12, 2011
35	15	"Shh!"	Chris Savino and Clay Morrow	Derek Dressler	Howie Perry, Chong Lee, Chuck Klein and Scott O'Brien	November 19, 2011
Sister Pact: Kick tries to help his sister get into the prestigious Poise Posse club after he had ruined her entry chances at the club's auditions last year and now must earn back Brianna's trust. Shh!: Kick must research a strange creature called a Nuzzlet given to him to make a school report, but here's the rub the book he needs, and the only place quiet enough for him to do his report are both in the... Library.
36	16	"K-Nein"	Chris Savino and Clay Morrow	Derek Dressler	Scott O'Brien	December 3, 2011
36	16	"Bromance"	Chris Savino and Clay Morrow	Derek Dressler	Howie Perry	March 24, 2012
K-Nein: Kick finds a dog called Jazzy and grows attached, but what will he do when he discovers the dog's purpose is to prevent any and all stunts? Bromance: In order to see a new movie Kick tags along on Brad's date to make sure it goes well, but there are two problems: his date finds Kick better company than Brad, and Brad has his habits of being an oppressive big brother. Special Guest Star: Fergie as April in "Bromance"
37	17	"A Cousin Kyle Christmas"	Chris Savino and Clay Morrow	Patrick Andrew O'Connor, Joe Liss and Dave Lewman	Scott O'Brien	December 6, 2011
37	17	"Snow Problem"	Chris Savino and Clay Morrow	Written by : Derek Dressler; Story by : Eric Rivera	Erik Wiese and Troy Adomitis	December 6, 2011
A Cousin Kyle Christmas: It's secret Santa time at the Buttowski's! Kick gets Kyle as a secret Santa but when Kick has a change of heart he goes to great lengths to get Kyle the perfect gift. Snow Problem: When Kick causes an avalanche it traps the Buttowski family and Kick has to find a way to get them out before they get cabin fever and goes crazy.
38	18	"Attic-a"	Chris Savino and Clay Morrow	Derek Dressler	Stephen DeStefano and Howie Perry	January 28, 2012
38	18	"Free Gunther"	Chris Savino and Clay Morrow	Written by : Derek Dressler and Patrick Andrew O'Connor; Story by : Patrick Andrew O'Connor	Scott O'Brien	January 14, 2012
Attic-a: Kick, Brad and Harold get stuck in a cold freezing attic together with no way out, or is there? Free Gunther: When Gunther gets grounded on the night of Boom McCondor's BMX Joust, Magnus (evidently wanting to give him a sporting chance) challenges Kick to a BattleSneegan to see if he can get Gunther on the sidewalk before sundown; if he doesn't, Gunther's grounding gets extended for a year. And if that's not bad enough, Magnus has never ever lost a BattleSneegan before.
39	19	"Sleepy River Wild"	Chris Savino and Clay Morrow	Written by : Patrick Andrew O'Connor; Story by : Derek Dressler and Patrick Andrew O'Connor	Scott O'Brien and Troy Adomitis	July 21, 2012
39	19	"Power Play"	Chris Savino and Clay Morrow	Written by : Patrick Andrew O'Connor; Story by : Derek Dressler and Patrick Andrew O'Connor	Heather Martinez	January 21, 2012
Sleepy River Wild: Kick reluctantly agrees to go on a "sleepy river" water park ride with Gunther. When Gunther falls asleep, Kick decides to take an unauthorized detour in an attempt to find adventure, but gets more than he bargained for. Power Play: Kick must protect Ronaldo from danger until the school play of Romeo and Juliet is over or he will have to take his place. Now normally that wouldn't be so bad, but the Juliet of the play is Kendall.
40	20	"Poll Position"	Chris Savino and Clay Morrow	Derek Dressler	Stephen DeStefano and Troy Adomitis	March 10, 2012
40	20	"Jock Wilder's Nature Camp"	Chris Savino and Clay Morrow	Derek Dressler	Mark Ackland, Riccardo Durante and Scott O'Brien	February 4, 2012
Poll Position: To stop Kendall from winning a class election and making his life miserable, Kick gets Wacky Jackie to run against her, but he soon discovers it to be a mistake he'll regret. Will he be forced to choice between the lesser of two evils before Mellowbrook Elementary is torn apart? Jock Wilder's Nature Camp: Kick and Gunther go to nature camp and are paired up with two different counselors. While Gunther gets Jock Wilder, Kick is stuck with his overly cautious brother Larry Wilder. Special Guest Star: Jim Parsons as Larry Wilder in "Jock Wilder's Nature Camp"
41	21	"Swap Meet"	Chris Savino and Clay Morrow	Eric Rivera and Derek Dressler	Mark Ackland and Riccardo Durante	February 11, 2012
41	21	"Bee Awesome!"	Chris Savino and Clay Morrow	Eric Rivera	Chris Sonnenburg and Howie Perry	May 19, 2012
Swap Meet: After being entrusted with the task of hiding the parents anniversary present and an incident with Brad, Kick "loses" his mother's anniversary present at a swap meet and must track it down before it's sold, along with his fathers trust in him. Bee Awesome!: It is time for the state regional spelling bee. But thanks to a lunch-themed error from Principal Henry, the only person who is well enough to partake in the bee is Kick, who is "a horrible speller".
42	22	"Trash Talk"	Chris Savino and Clay Morrow	Eric Rivera	Chris Sonnenburg and Mike Kunkel	February 18, 2012
42	22	"Nerves of Steal"	Chris Savino and Clay Morrow	Patrick Andrew O'Connor	Brett Varon	June 30, 2012
Trash Talk: Kick is caught littering by Officer Irwin and is assigned highway clean-up duty, but a pesky rival makes Kick's job harder. Can Kick (with Gunther's help) bring this rival to justice or will he be buried by the one thing he's supposed to get rid of? Nerves of Steal: Kick, while in the midst of his para-boarding ambitions, is strapped for a material that can withstand the G-Forces when he is airborne but is denied such a thing when he tries to borrow such a thing from his neighbors. But when a thief surfaces in the neighborhood, a sleep-deprived Kick is accused of stealing the items, so to clear his name he forms a neighborhood watch with Gunther. He eventually comes up with no leads and now has one night to turn up a perp, or the neighbors will be calling in the boys in blue. In the midst of his last-ditch effort even Kick will be surprised as to the thief's identity. Special Guest Star: John Henson as Chuck Glarman in "Trash Talk"
43	23	"Goodbye, Gully"	Chris Savino and Clay Morrow	Derek Dressler and Patrick Andrew O'Connor	Mark Ackland and Riccardo Durante	December 2, 2012
43	23	"Bad Car-ma"	Chris Savino and Clay Morrow	Derek Dressler	Chris Sonnenburg and Troy Adomitis	March 17, 2012
Goodbye, Gully: Gordie tries to impress his father, Mr. Gibble, by threatening to destroy Kick and Gunther's favorite hangout, The Gully. The only way for them to save it is by outsmarting him. Bad Car-ma: Dad's beloved car Monique is towed away, so Kick and Dad have to work together to get it back. Special Guest Star: Mark Cuban as Mr. Gibble in "Goodbye, Gully"
44	24	"Bwar and Peace"	Chris Savino and Clay Morrow	Derek Dressler	Scott O'Brien, Troy Adomitis, Howie Perry and Chuck Klein	April 7, 2012
After a botched reenactment, Kick is selected to star in a Viking reenactment over Gunther who really wanted to star in the reenactment. After a second Botched Reenactment when Kick tries to set the record straight by having Gunther do the reenactment instead of him, Gunther is now being mistaken for an ancient Viking warrior when he along with Kick's family visits the Old Country. Gunther is now being hailed as a hero and a celebrity instead of his usual status as a wing-man. Gunther states that he will never leave the old country again. Can Kick save their friendship before it's too late? Note: This episode is a half-hour episode.
45	25	"Bad Table Manners"	Chris Savino and Clay Morrow	Written by : Derek Dressler and Patrick Andrew O'Connor; Story by : Patrick Andrew O'Connor	Troy Adomitis, Howie Perry and Chuck Klein	May 5, 2012
45	25	"Petrified!"	Chris Savino and Clay Morrow	Written by : Derek Dressler and Jonathan Howard; Story by : Jonathan Howard	Howie Perry	October 13, 2012
Bad Table Manners: A new big screen TV has shown up and with that Brad and Brianna are the first to make claims to the TV. Harold makes them play ping pong to decide who gets control over the TV for a night (which is the way the Buttowski family used to settle things when Harold was younger rather than fighting). Brad and Brianna both have bad table manners with ping pong, but things start to get out of hand when Harold picks up a paddle, and now the only one who can stop him is... Kick. Petrified!: Kick, Harold and Brad continue their annual tradition of telling scary stories during a campout, but this year, Kick's story is so scary that the boys begin to fear it has come true.
46	26	"Say Cheese"	Chris Savino and Clay Morrow	Written by : Mike Yank; Story by : Chuck Hayward	Scott O'Brien	October 6, 2012
46	26	"Pinch Sitter"	Chris Savino and Clay Morrow	Jennifer Keene	Mike Kunkel	May 13, 2012
Say Cheese: After a dispute over the last slice of pizza ensues between the Buttowski siblings, a precious item of their mothers is destroyed (her favorite picture of the three of them). Can they put aside their differences long enough to get a replacement picture to appease their now mentally unstable mother? Pinch Sitter: Kick's mom hires Kendall to babysit the Buttowski brothers after she witnesses Brad's terrible babysitting skills.
47	27	"Brad's Diary"	Chris Savino and Clay Morrow	Written by : Scott O'Brien; Story by : Derek Dressler and Dan Reilly	Scott O'Brien	June 23, 2012
47	27	"Sew What"	Chris Savino and Clay Morrow	Written by : Derek Dressler and Tabitha Vidaurri; Story by : Tabitha Vidaurri	Chuck Klein	July 7, 2012
Brad's Diary: After Brad takes all his savings, Kick violates a newly founded brotherly-bond agreement when he decides to get back at his brother by stealing his diary. Sew What: When Kick's grandma, Rosie, comes to visit, they have a blast together until she gives Kick a new jumpsuit for his stunt. Kick finds himself torn between making his grandma happy by wearing the embarrassing outfit or risk hurting her feelings by not wearing it.
48	28	"Big Mouth"	Chris Savino and Clay Morrow	Eric Rivera	Howie Perry	July 14, 2012
48	28	"Last Fan Standing"	Chris Savino and Clay Morrow	Written by : Derek Dressler; Story by : Mike Yank	Mark Ackland	December 2, 2012
Big Mouth: Kick and Gunther become sidekicks to Mouth after they seek his help to watch a live TV broadcast of "Jock Wilder's Crock Wrestle 2". Last Fan Standing: Kick can't get a wink of sleep when Wacky Jackie and Cousin Kyle compete over who is his #1 fan and throw him a celebration in honor of his latest stunt.
49	29	"Crumbs!"	Chris Savino and Clay Morrow	Written by : Derek Dressler; Story by : Derek Dressler and Eric Rivera	David Smith	November 4, 2012
49	29	"Stay Cool"	Chris Savino and Clay Morrow	Eric Rivera	Howie Perry	July 21, 2012
Crumbs!: Honey entrusts Kick with keeping a batch of her homemade cookies away from Harold. Kick is sure it will be easy, but Harold will stop at nothing to get his hands on those cookies, exhibiting Kick-style determination. Stay Cool: Kick and Brianna break Dad's air conditioner on the hottest day of the year, but Brad is blamed and grounded for the whole summer. Kick and Brianna agree to keep their blunder a secret, but Kick struggles with the mounting guilt.
50	30	"Only the Loan-ly"	Chris Savino and Clay Morrow	Derek Dressler	Riccardo Durante	October 28, 2012
50	30	"Roll Reversal"	Chris Savino and Clay Morrow	Eric Rivera	Chris Sonnenburg and Troy Adomitis	July 28, 2012
Only the Loan-ly: Kick needs money to buy an awesome bike engine and convinces Brianna to let him borrow the money. When he can't pay it back in time, Brianna, with the help of her friends Madison and Abbie, becomes a loan shark and pushes her brother to make good on his promise. Roll Reversal: When Kendall inadvertently outdoes Kick at a Motocross stunt and claims to be "Mellowbrook's Top Daredevil", she is challenged to a rematch by Kick. Kendall agrees to only participate in an all-girl Roller Derby, so Kick and his friends must put on disguises in order to compete.
51	31	"Meathead Justice"	Chris Savino and Clay Morrow	Written by : Derek Dressler and Mike Yank; Story by : Mike Yank	Carl Faruolo	August 4, 2012
51	31	"Bwar-Mart"	Chris Savino and Clay Morrow	Mike Yank	Mark Ackland and Riccardo Durante	September 29, 2012
Meathead Justice: After Kick saves the DiPazzi twins' lives, they become indebted to him by their code of ethics. When they do not leave his side, he must go to extreme measures to get them out of his life, but the question here is who is in the most need of goons like the DiPazzi Twins? Bwar-Mart: Kick and Gunther break Magnus' meat slicer the day before the annual Battlesnax Salted Meats Festival, so they brave an epic Viking department store, Bwar-Mart, to find a replacement. When they are trapped in the store after hours, they must find a way to escape before the wacky store manager makes them employees for life.
52	32	"Kyle E. Coyote"	Chris Savino and Clay Morrow	Derek Dressler	Howie Perry	September 22, 2012
52	32	"Locked Out"	Chris Savino and Clay Morrow	Written by : Scott O'Brien; Story by : Derek Dressler	Scott O'Brien	September 22, 2012
52	32	"Rocked"	Chris Savino and Clay Morrow	Written by : Derek Dressler; Story by : Mike Yank	Scott O'Brien and Troy Adomitis	September 22, 2012
Kyle E. Coyote: In order to attend the Gnarly Games, Kick must track down Cousin Kyle, who has just consumed an entire case of Cheetah Chug. However, catching his energized cousin is easier said than done! Locked Out: After sneaking out of the house to see the new Rock Callahan movie, Kick arrives home to find that his dad has installed a new security system and must dismantle this extreme robot before his dad wakes up. Rocked: Rock portrays Kick in an action-movie. In the movie, Rock-as-Kick must defeat the evil villain, The Dark One, who threatens to take over Mellowopolis. Special Guest Star: Tony Reali as The Dark One.
