= Airbus (band) =

English rock band

Airbus is an English rock band from Portishead, England. A group of friends who attended Gordano School formed the band in 1987 under the name of Carrion, soon changing the name to Airbus.

== Line-up ==
The line-up is Nick Davidge (guitar and vocals), James Childs (guitar and vocals), Simon Hedges (bass) and Chris Fielden (drums). This line-up remained consistent until 2001. Simon decided to leave and the band briefly drafted in Oliver Morris on Bass but then they relocated to the US with Sagon Dooman playing bass until August 2002.

== History ==
=== 1993 First Cut ===
In 1993, after the release of the single Inertia which sold well in Bristol record shops, Airbus won ITV's First Cut competition. This was broadcast on the television and the filmed live performances gave the band a lot of exposure in the South West of England. The £5,000 cash prize allowed the band to invest in recording equipment and set up their own recording studio. In 1993, Airbus were approached by Geoff Barrow of the band Portishead and asked to record a B-side for their first single, "Sour Times". The band members had been friends with Barrow since school. He gave them a tape with a click track on it and Beth Gibbons’ vocal, refusing to play them the full song until they had written and recorded the music. The Airbus Reconstruction was released as a B-side on a British CD release of "Sour Times", gaining Airbus more good exposure.

=== Gravity (1997) ===
Between 1993 and 1997, Airbus worked hard touring and improving their studio recordings, which were self-produced. This culminated in the recording of the EP Gravity which was released on the band's own record label, Spira Records. The EP generated a lot of interest from independent and major record labels and Airbus signed a contract with BMG Music Publishing (now part of the Universal Music Publishing Group) in 1997.

=== Ghosts (2000) ===
The advance they received from BMG allowed them to improve their recording equipment and, after more touring (including playing the New Bands Stage at the Glastonbury Festival in 1999), they set about recording the album, Ghosts. The album was released in 2000 and an extensive UK tour followed.

=== 2002 disbanding ===
In 2002, Airbus disbanded so the members could pursue their own personal projects. Nick Davidge and James Childs both settled in Los Angeles. Nick works in a creative agency and James plays in a variety of bands and regularly tours all over the world. Simon Hedges now works in television production in the UK. Chris Fielden works at a digital marketing agency in Bristol, England and, through writing fiction, runs a popular writing blog. Nick, James, Simon and Chris still record together, working on old and new Airbus material that is made available on their website.

=== 2017 reforming ===
The band has re-formed in 2017 for a gig at the Bristol BierKeller.

== Discography ==
- Spitfire (1988 – album)
- Apple Trees (1990 – album)
- Bug and the Big Fish (1991 – album)
- Primitive Carnival (1992 – album)
- "Inertia" (1993 – single)
- "Sour Times" (1994 – Portishead B-Side)
- Gravity (1997 – EP)
- Ghosts (2000 – album)
- No (2001 – EP)
