= Amasa Farrier Boardinghouse =

- U.S. National Register of Historic Places
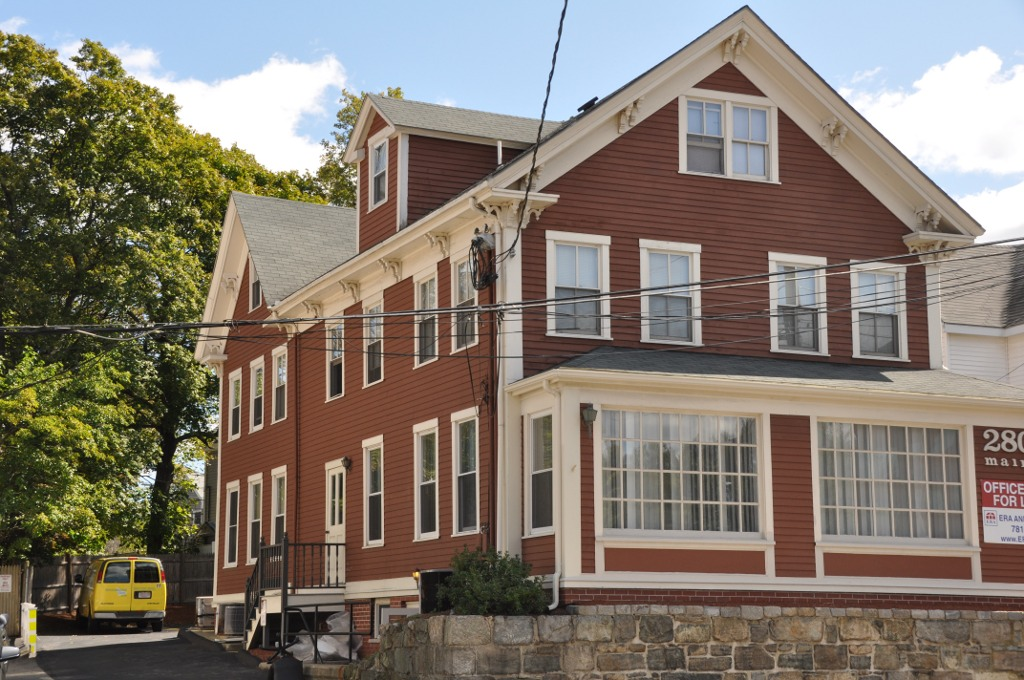

- Location within Massachusetts Location within the United States
- Location: 280 Main St., Stoneham, Massachusetts
- Coordinates: 42°28′59″N 71°6′0″W
- Built: 1865
- Architectural style: Italianate
- MPS: Stoneham MRA
- NRHP reference No.: 84002601
- Added to NRHP: April 13, 1984

The Amasa Farrier Boardinghouse is a historic house at 280 Main Street in Stoneham, Massachusetts. The large wood-frame house was built c. 1865 by Amasa Farrier, the town surveyor. The building served as a boarding house for workers in Stoneham's shoe factories, and is the only boarding house of the period to survive in the town. It is a 2 1/2-story wood-frame structure with modest Italianate styling, including bracketed eaves and gable, and broad corner boards. A period porch with bracketed turned posts has been replaced by an enclosed porch.

The house was listed on the National Register of Historic Places in 1984.

== See also ==
- Amasa Farrier House, Farrier's own residence
- National Register of Historic Places listings in Stoneham, Massachusetts
- National Register of Historic Places listings in Middlesex County, Massachusetts
