= First Unitarian Church (Stoneham, Massachusetts) =

Historic church in Massachusetts, United States

- U.S. National Register of Historic Places
- U.S. Historic district – Contributing property
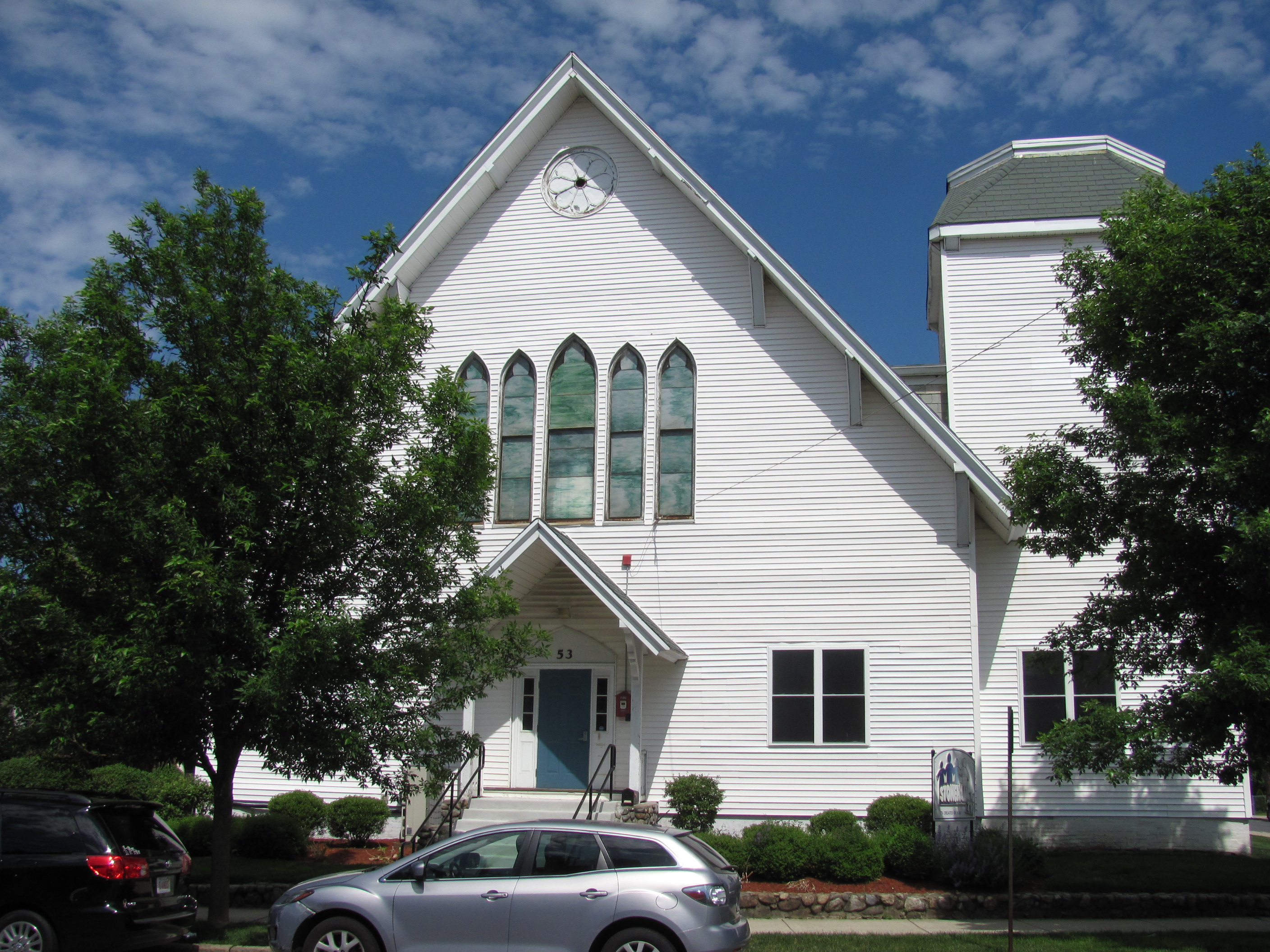
- First Unitarian Church

- Location within Massachusetts Location within the United States
- Location: 53 Central Street, Stoneham, Massachusetts
- Coordinates: 42°28′52″N 71°5′55″W
- Built: 1869
- Architectural style: Stick/Eastlake, Gothic Revival
- Part of: Central Square Historic District (ID89002277)
- MPS: Stoneham MRA
- NRHP reference No.: 84002612

Significant dates
- Added to NRHP: April 13, 1984
- Designated CP: January 17, 1990

The First Unitarian Church is a historic former church building in Stoneham, Massachusetts. One of Stoneham's more stylish Gothic Revival buildings, the Stick style wood structure was built in 1869 for a Unitarian congregation that was organized in 1858. The building was listed on the National Register of Historic Places in 1984, and included in the Central Square Historic District in 1990. It presently houses the local Community Access Television organization.

== Description and history ==
The First Unitarian Church building is set at the northeast corner of Common and Central Streets on the north side of downtown Stoneham. Across Central Street stand two other churches. This one is a single-story wood-frame structure, its exterior finished in wooden clapboards. The building originally had a number of architecturally significant Stick style features, but many of these have been lost recently. The gable end facing Central Street, and the gabled hood sheltering the entrance, both had stick style diagonal and vertical boardwork. The tower originally sported an elaborate open belfry, with an octagonal steeple above. Four sides of the steeple had dormers in which there were clock faces.

The Unitarian congregation in Stoneham was organized in 1858, and this church was built for it in 1869. The congregation occupied this building until it disbanded in 1995. The building is now used by Stoneham TV, a local Community Access Television station.

== See also ==
- National Register of Historic Places listings in Stoneham, Massachusetts
- National Register of Historic Places listings in Middlesex County, Massachusetts
