= Skip Sweetser =

American rower

Personal information
- Nationality: American
- Born: August 29, 1936 Kansas City, Kansas, U.S.
- Died: November 17, 2020 (aged 84) Verona, New Jersey, U.S.

Sport
- Sport: Rowing

Skip Sweetser (August 29, 1936 – November 17, 2020) was an American rower. He competed in the men's eight event at the 1960 Summer Olympics. His great-great-grandfather, Warren Sweetser, built Warren Sweetser House in 1842.
