= Dow Hall =

Dow Hall may refer to:

- Blind Department Building and Dow Hall, State School for the Blind, in Faribault, Minnesota, United States
- Dow Hall, at Briarcliff College, formerly Mrs. Dow's School for Girls, in Briarcliff Manor, New York, United States

== See also ==
- Dow House (disambiguation)
