= Dow Block =

- U.S. National Register of Historic Places
- U.S. Historic district – Contributing property
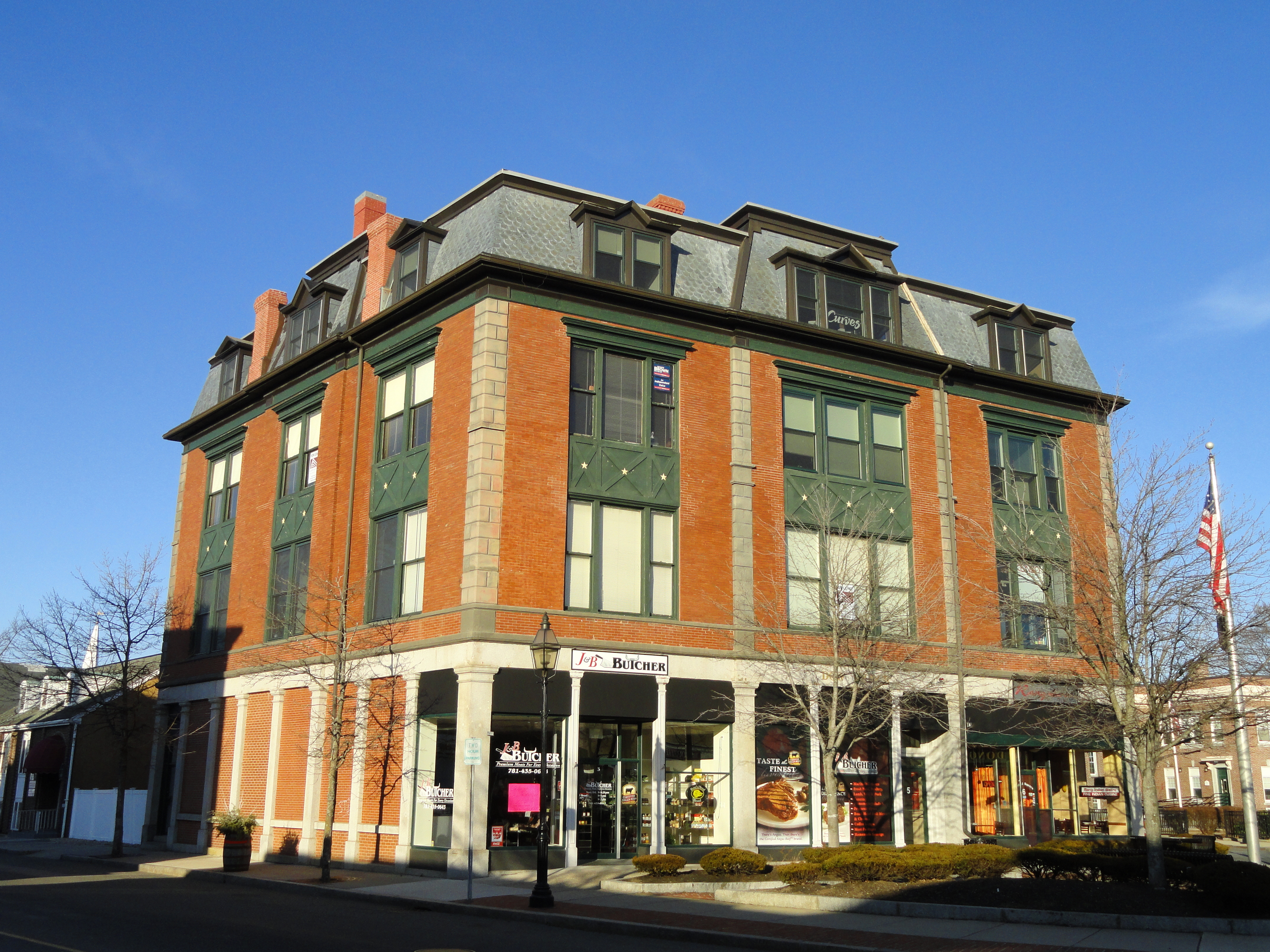
- Dow Block

- Location within Massachusetts Location within the United States
- Location: Central Square, Stoneham, Massachusetts
- Coordinates: 42°28′45″N 71°6′2″W
- Built: 1864
- Architectural style: Second Empire
- Part of: Central Square Historic District (ID89002277)
- MPS: Stoneham MRA
- NRHP reference No.: 84002570

Significant dates
- Added to NRHP: April 13, 1984
- Designated CP: January 17, 1990

The Dow Block is a historic commercial building on Central Square in Stoneham, Massachusetts. Built in 1864, it is the first of three mid-19th century buildings that define Central Square, and is a fine example of Second Empire architecture. The building was listed on the National Register of Historic Places in 1984, and was included in the Central Square Historic District in 1990.

== Description and history ==
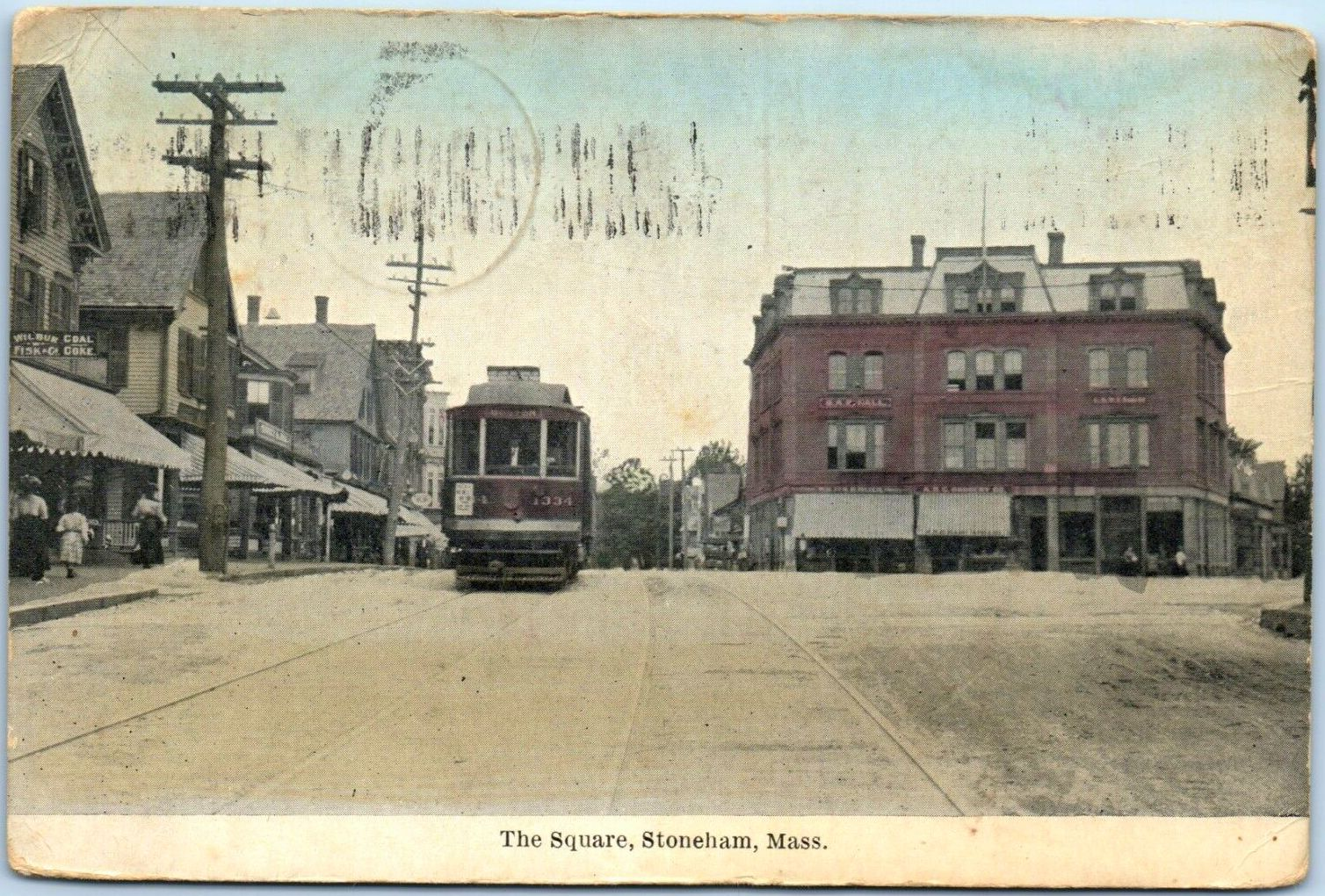
Early-20th-century postcard of the Dow Block

Central Square in the heart of Stoneham is a triangular square defined by Main Street (Massachusetts Route 28), which runs north-south, and Central Street, which extends northeast from a junction that also includes Franklin Street. The Dow Block stands just north of a small plaza at the corner. It is a 3 1/2-story brick building with a mansard roof, and presenting a symmetrical facade south to the square. The roof is made of patterned slate tiles, and has a central projecting and raised section. Three dormers with hip roofs and small central gables are arranged across, the central one with a three-part window and the outer ones with paired sash windows. The facade is divided into three portions demarcated by sandstone quoins at the corners and similar piers between. Windows on the second and third floors are separated by Stick style panels.

The Dow Block was built in 1864 by Moses Dow, a real estate investor from Charlestown. Early uses of the building included housing the town post office and library. Along with the Oddfellows Building (c. 1870) and Chase Block (1874), the building is one of the defining elements of Stoneham's Central Square.

== See also ==
- National Register of Historic Places listings in Stoneham, Massachusetts
- National Register of Historic Places listings in Middlesex County, Massachusetts
