= First Congregational Church (Stoneham, Massachusetts) =

Historic church in Massachusetts, United States

- U.S. National Register of Historic Places
- U.S. Historic district – Contributing property
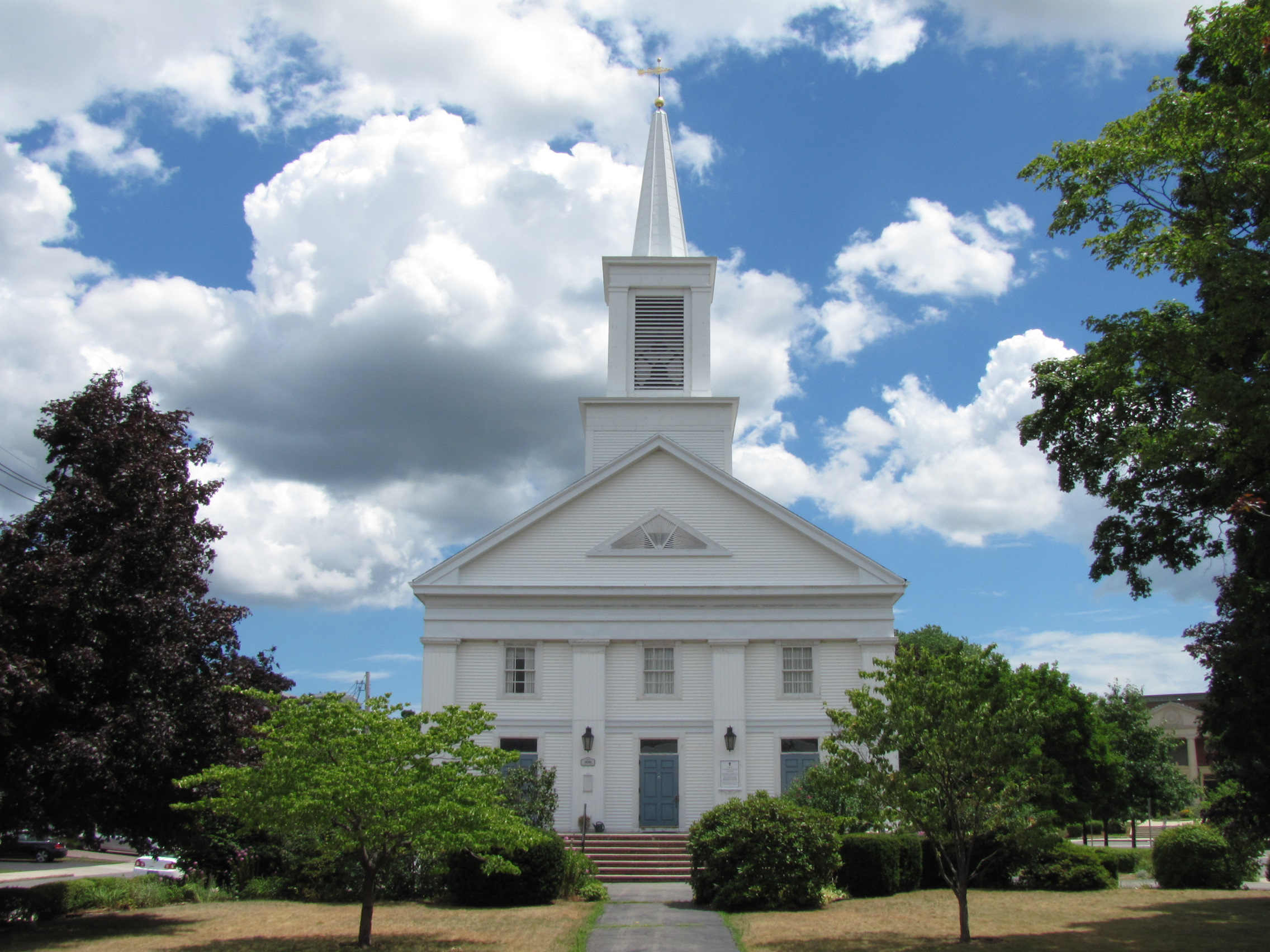
- First Congregational Church

- Location within Massachusetts Location within the United States
- Location: 1 Church St., Stoneham, Massachusetts
- Coordinates: 42.48073°N 71.09996°W
- Built: 1840
- Architectural style: Greek Revival
- Part of: Central Square Historic District (ID89002277)
- MPS: Stoneham MRA
- NRHP reference No.: 84002609

Significant dates
- Added to NRHP: April 13, 1984
- Designated CP: January 17, 1990

The First Congregational Church is an historic church in Stoneham, Massachusetts, United States. Built in 1840, it is a fine local example of Greek Revival architecture, and is a landmark in the town center. It was listed on the National Register of Historic Places on April 13, 1984. The church is affiliated with the United Church of Christ; the current pastor is the Rev. Ken McGarry.

== Description and history ==
Stoneham's First Congregational Church is set on the east side of Main Street (Massachusetts Route 28), just north of the town common, which is across Church Street. The main sanctuary is a rectangular wood-frame building, with a gable roof and a brick foundation. The front facade, facing west, is flushboarded, while the remaining sides are clapboarded. The main facade is divided into three bays by Doric pilasters, each bay having an entrance at the ground level with a window above. The pilasters support an entablature that extends around the sides of the building, with a fully pedimented gable end above. The pediment has a triangular window at its center. The tower rises from the ridge line near the front, with a plain square stage rising to a louvered belfry stage and an octagonal spire.

The congregation was organized in 1729; this, its third sanctuary, was built in 1840 after the second one burned. It was listed on the National Register of Historic Places in 1984, and was included as part of the Central Square Historic District in 1990.

== See also ==
- National Register of Historic Places listings in Stoneham, Massachusetts
- National Register of Historic Places listings in Middlesex County, Massachusetts
