= Michael Sweetser House =

Historic house in Massachusetts, United States

- U.S. National Register of Historic Places
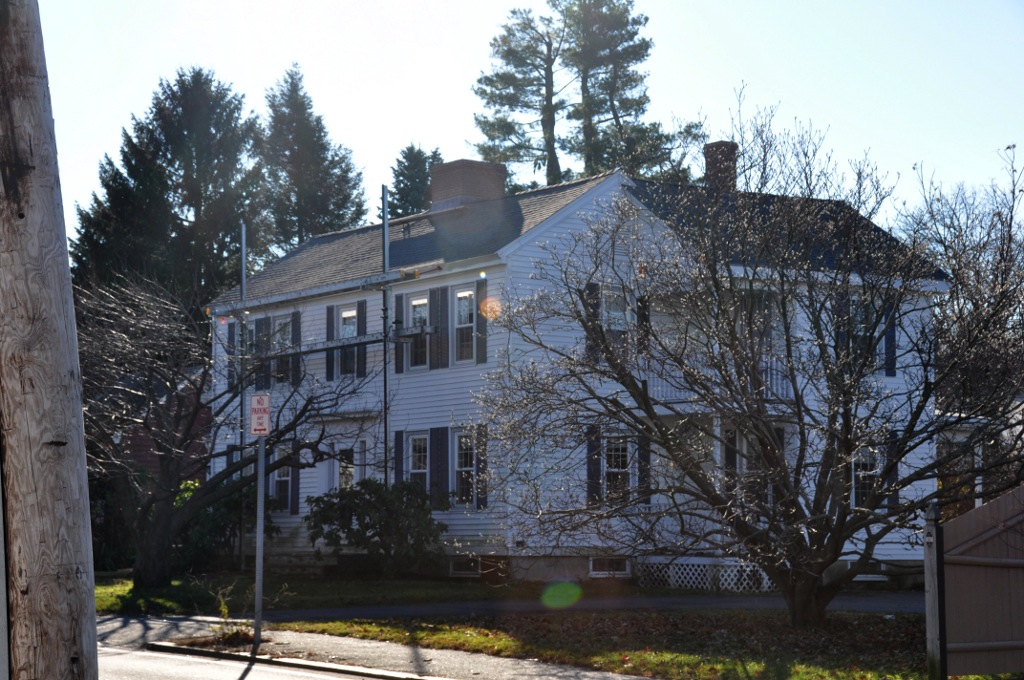

- Location within Massachusetts Location within the United States
- Location: 15 Nahant St., Wakefield, Massachusetts
- Coordinates: 42°29′51.55″N 71°4′7.76″W
- Built: 1755
- Architectural style: Greek Revival, Georgian
- MPS: Wakefield MRA
- NRHP reference No.: 89000699
- Added to NRHP: July 06, 1989

The Michael Sweetser House is a historic house at 15 Nahant Street in Wakefield, Massachusetts. The 2 1/2-story timber-frame house was built c. 1755 by Michael Sweetser, an early settler of the area. It is traditionally Georgian in character, although its front door surround was added during Greek Revival period of the mid 19th century. One of the house's 19th century occupants was Paul Hart Sweetser, one of the founders of the Massachusetts Teachers Association and a locally active politician.

The house was listed on the National Register of Historic Places in 1989.

== See also ==
- National Register of Historic Places listings in Wakefield, Massachusetts
- National Register of Historic Places listings in Middlesex County, Massachusetts
