= James Childs =

British musician

- Childs in 2026
- Born: June 12, 1972 (age 54); Bristol, England, U.K.
- Citizenship: United Kingdom, United States
- Occupations: Musician, vocalist, guitarist, composer, producer
- Writing career
- Years active: 1997–present

James Childs (born 12 June 1972) is an English musician and composer-producer. He was born in Bristol, and grew up in the nearby town of Portishead. As a member of the rock group Airbus, he contributed to Bristol's flourishing music scene during the 1990s.

Childs worked with Geoff Barrow on a remix of the Portishead hit single "Sourtimes".

Signing to BMG in 1997, Childs gained moderate success with Airbus in the UK. He then moved to Los Angeles in 2001 and worked on the group’s material with producers Rick Parker and Richard Dashut, who produced Rumours by Fleetwood Mac. Airbus disbanded in 2002.

In 2003, Childs formed 'Black on Sunshine' with Peter Finestone, the original drummer for Bad Religion.

He then joined forces with Chris Cockrell, formerly of Kyuss, in the band 'Vic du Monte's Idiot Prayer' and produced their album Prey For The City, which was released on the Duna Records label in February 2005. While playing keyboards and bass guitar in the band, Childs and Vic du Monte's Idiot Prayer successfully toured all of Europe in spring 2005.

Childs and Cockrell moved on to form 'Vic du Monte's Persona Non Grata' with Alfredo Hernandez, who played drums in Kyuss and Queens of the Stone Age. Vic du Monte's Persona Non Grata signed to Cargo Records and have been touring together since 2005.

Childs also collaborated with Motörhead drummer Philthy Animal Taylor on a project called 'Little Villains'.

When he is not touring, he composes music for film and TV, often with long-time friend and musical collaborator Andy Sturmer. The pair were nominated for an Emmy Award for composing the theme tune for Disney XD's Kick Buttowski animated series.

Whilst spending some time back in the UK, Childs worked with Geoff Barrow and Billy Fuller as front of house sound for Beak on their European and American tours of 2012 and 2013.

He worked again with Alfredo Hernandez with the California desert group Brave Black Sea recording two of their sessions.

Childs spent much of 2013 and 2014 on the road working with Australian production company Showtime Management in the USA, Australia, New Zealand and Canada, performing theaters and arenas.

In 2013 -14, Childs sang and played guitar with his group Lakota, releasing its debut self-titled LP in September 2014.

James currently fronts and tours with the desert rock band Avon. He also fronts and tours with Little Villains, a project that he originally formed with the late Philthy Animal Taylor who is now replaced by Christopher Fielden who Childs had worked with in Airbus.

In 2019 one of his collaborations with Philthy Animal Taylor that was recorded in 2007 and called Philthy Lies was released on Heavy Psych Sounds Records.

More recordings that James and Philthy Animal Taylor had made together in 2005 - 2006 called "Taylor Made" surfaced in 2019. The album also features bass guitar and background vocal from Alan Davey formerly of Hawkwind and was released by Cleopatra Records in 2020.

In 2019 James worked with Australian drummer Kyle Thompson on a new Avon Desert Rock single called ‘Man of Medan’ released by H42 records in 2020.

== Discography ==
- Airbus Apple Trees LP Spira Records 1991.
- Airbus Bug and the Big Fish LP Spira Records 1992.
- Airbus Inertia Single Spira Records 1993.
- Airbus Ghosts EP Spira Records 1994.
- Portishead Sourtimes Single (Airbus reconstruction) Go Beat 1995.
- Airbus Gravity EP Spira Records 1997.
- Airbus Ghosts LP Spira Records/BMG 2000.
- Airbus No EP Spira records 2001.
- Black on Sunshine Hurricane Single Invada 2004.
- Vic du Monte's Idiot Prayer Prey For the City LP Duna Records 2005.
- Vic du Monte's Persona Non Grata Vic du Monte's Persona Non Grata LP Cargo Records 2005.
- Jinxremover Hospital Radio LP Spira Records/Cobraside/BMG 2006.
- Jinxremover Spitfire LP Spira Records/Cobraside 2007.
- Vic du Monte's Persona Non Grata Sweet Sixteen EP Music to Ruin your Life To 2007.
- Jinxremover Messerschmitt LP Spira Records/Cobraside 2008.
- The Jinxremover North Facing Fields LP Spira Records/Cobraside 2009.
- Vic du Monte's Persona Non Grata Autoblond LP Cobraside 2009.
- Vic du Monte's Persona Non Grata Re Dinemite EP Go Down Records 2009.
- Vic du Monte's Persona Non Grata Barons & Bankers LP Go Down Records 2010.
- Animal I LP Spira Records 2015.
- Lakota LP. spira Records 2015.
- Avon ‘’Mad Marco’’ LP Spira Records 2016.
- Avon ‘’Six Wheel Action Man Tank’’ Single H42 Records 2017.
- Airbus ‘’Primitive Carnival’’ LP Spira Records 2017.
- Avon ‘’ Dave’s Dungeon’’ LP Heavy Psych Sounds 2018.
- Little Villains. ‘’Philthy Lies’’ LP Heavy Psych Sounds 2019.
