= Lenoir Dow House =

Historic house in Massachusetts, United States

- U.S. National Register of Historic Places
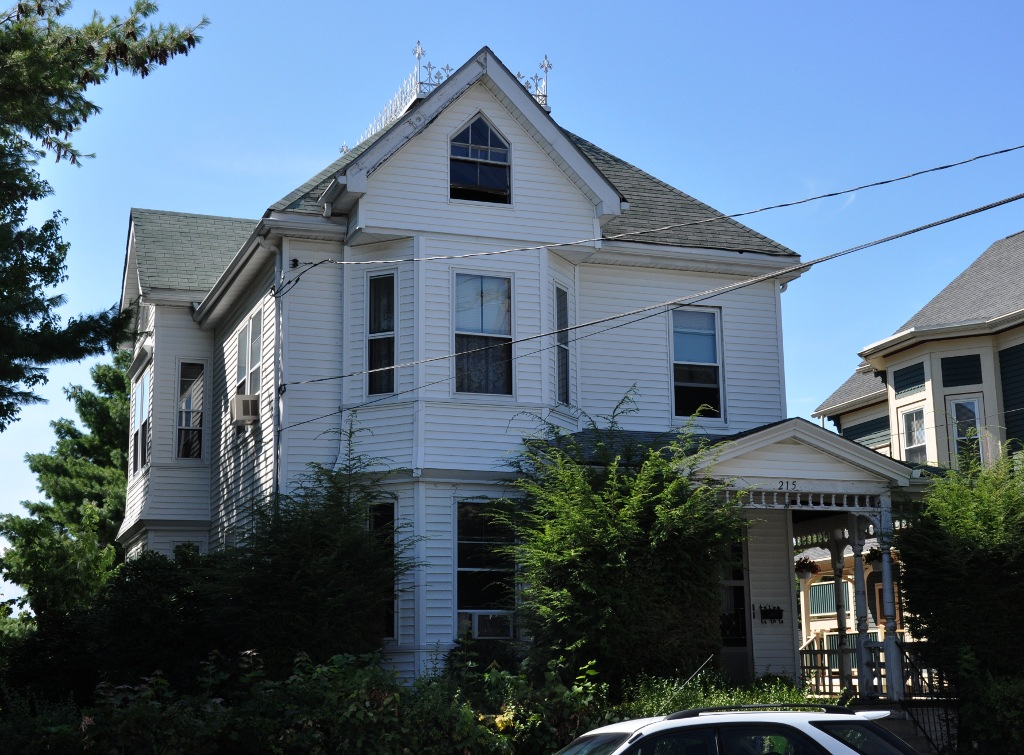

- Location within Massachusetts Location within the United States
- Location: 215 Adams St., Waltham, Massachusetts
- Coordinates: 42°21′48″N 71°14′33″W
- Built: 1888
- Architectural style: Queen Anne
- MPS: Waltham MRA
- NRHP reference No.: 89001487
- Added to NRHP: September 28, 1989

The Lenoir Dow House is a historic house at 215 Adams Street in Waltham, Massachusetts. The 2 1/2-story wood-frame house was built in 1888, during the building boom of the 1880s on Waltham's south side. Built to house workers at the Waltham Watch Company, the house is a well-preserved Queen Anne Victorian, with an asymmetrical facade, hip roof topped by iron cresting, and a porch with ornate woodwork. Lenoir Dow, the first owner, was a machinist.

The house was listed on the National Register of Historic Places in 1989.

== See also ==
- National Register of Historic Places listings in Waltham, Massachusetts
