= Simeon E. Dow House =

Historic house in Iowa, United States

- Dow House
- U.S. National Register of Historic Places
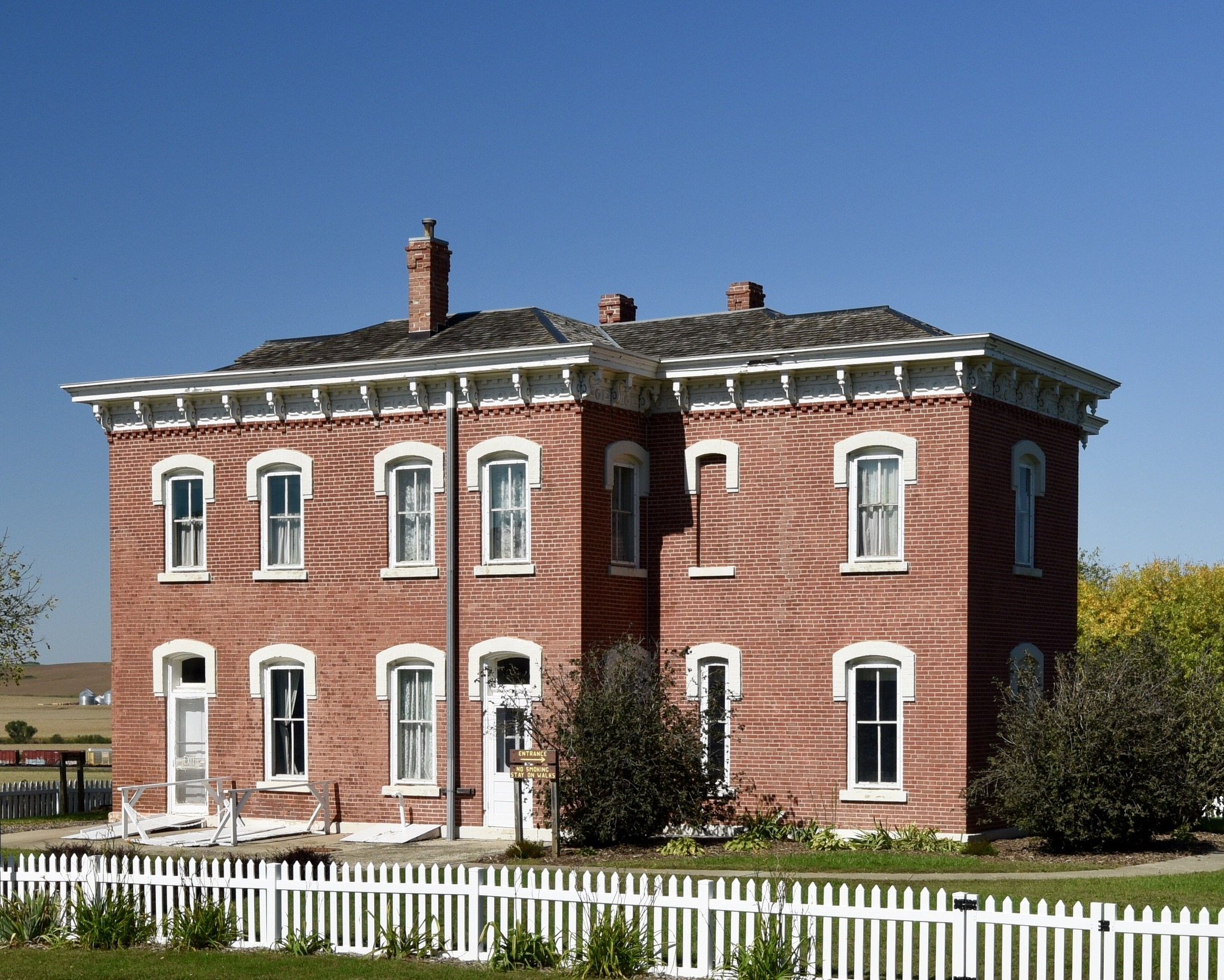
- Dow House

- Location within Iowa Location within the United States
- Interactive map showing the location of Simeon E. Dow House
- Location: Prince St. at south city limits, Dow City, Iowa
- Coordinates: 41°55′30″N 95°29′50″W
- Built: 1872; 154 years ago
- NRHP reference No.: 72000471
- Added to NRHP: June 14, 1972

The Simeon E. Dow House (also known as the Dow House) is a historic house located on Prince Street in Dow City, Iowa.

The two-story, 13-room, red brick house was built in 1872 by Simon E. Dow (Simeon E. Dow), who in 1869 co-founded Dow City and later became one of its leading businessmen. In 1970, it was bought by the Crawford County Conservation Board to be restored and is now open for public tours.
