= Oddfellows Building =

- U.S. National Register of Historic Places
- U.S. Historic district – Contributing property
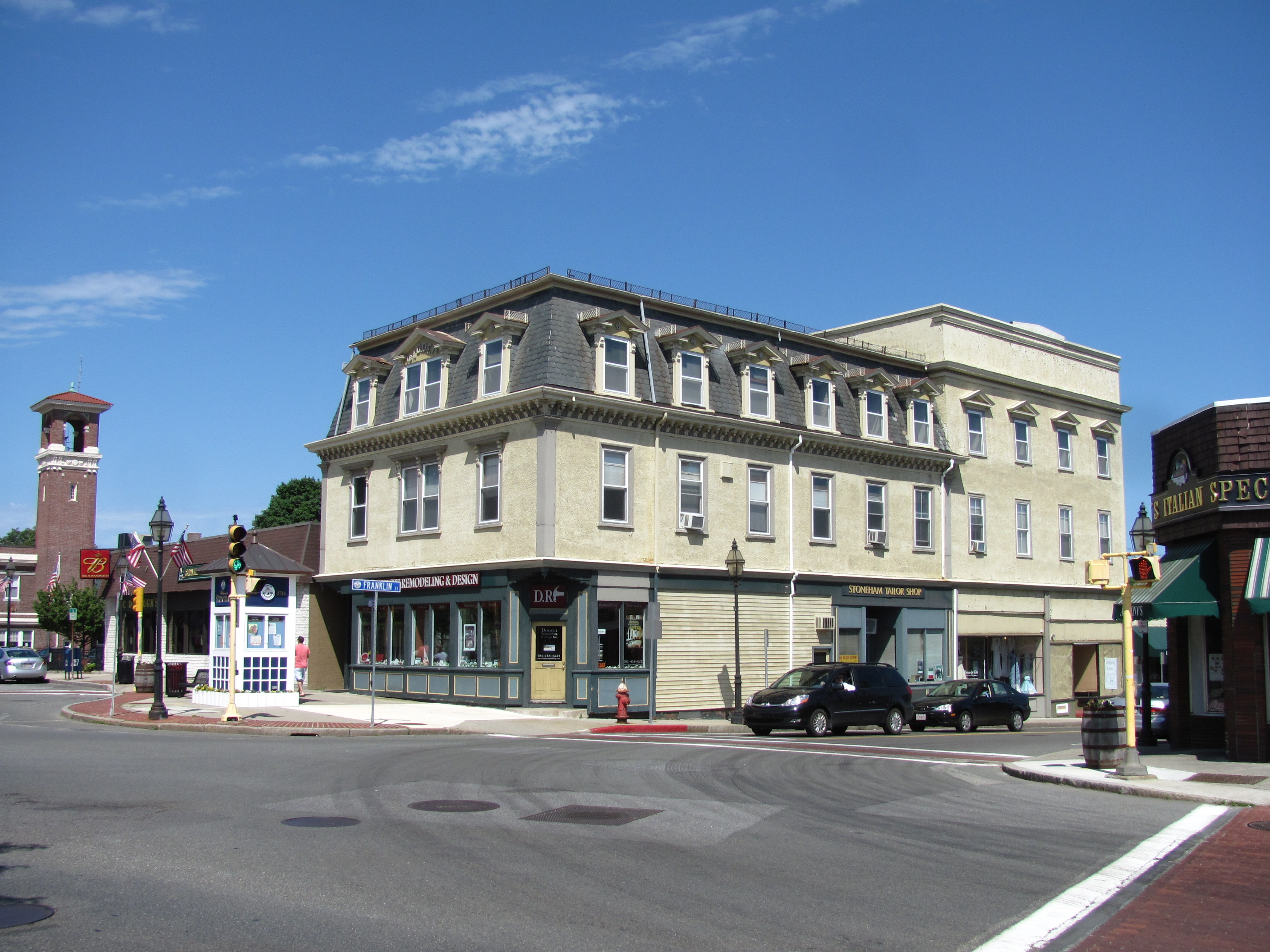
- Oddfellows Building

- Location within Massachusetts Location within the United States
- Location: Central Square, Stoneham, Massachusetts
- Coordinates: 42°28′51″N 71°5′59″W
- Area: less than one acre
- Built: 1868
- Architectural style: Second Empire
- Part of: Central Square Historic District (ID89002277)
- MPS: Stoneham MRA
- NRHP reference No.: 84002765

Significant dates
- Added to NRHP: April 13, 1984
- Designated CP: January 17, 1990

The Oddfellows Building is a historic mixed-use commercial building at Central Square in Stoneham, Massachusetts. Built in 1868, it is one of three Second Empire buildings that give downtown Stoneham its character, despite some exterior alterations. It was added to the National Register of Historic Places in 1984, and was included in the Central Square Historic District in 1990.

== Description and history ==
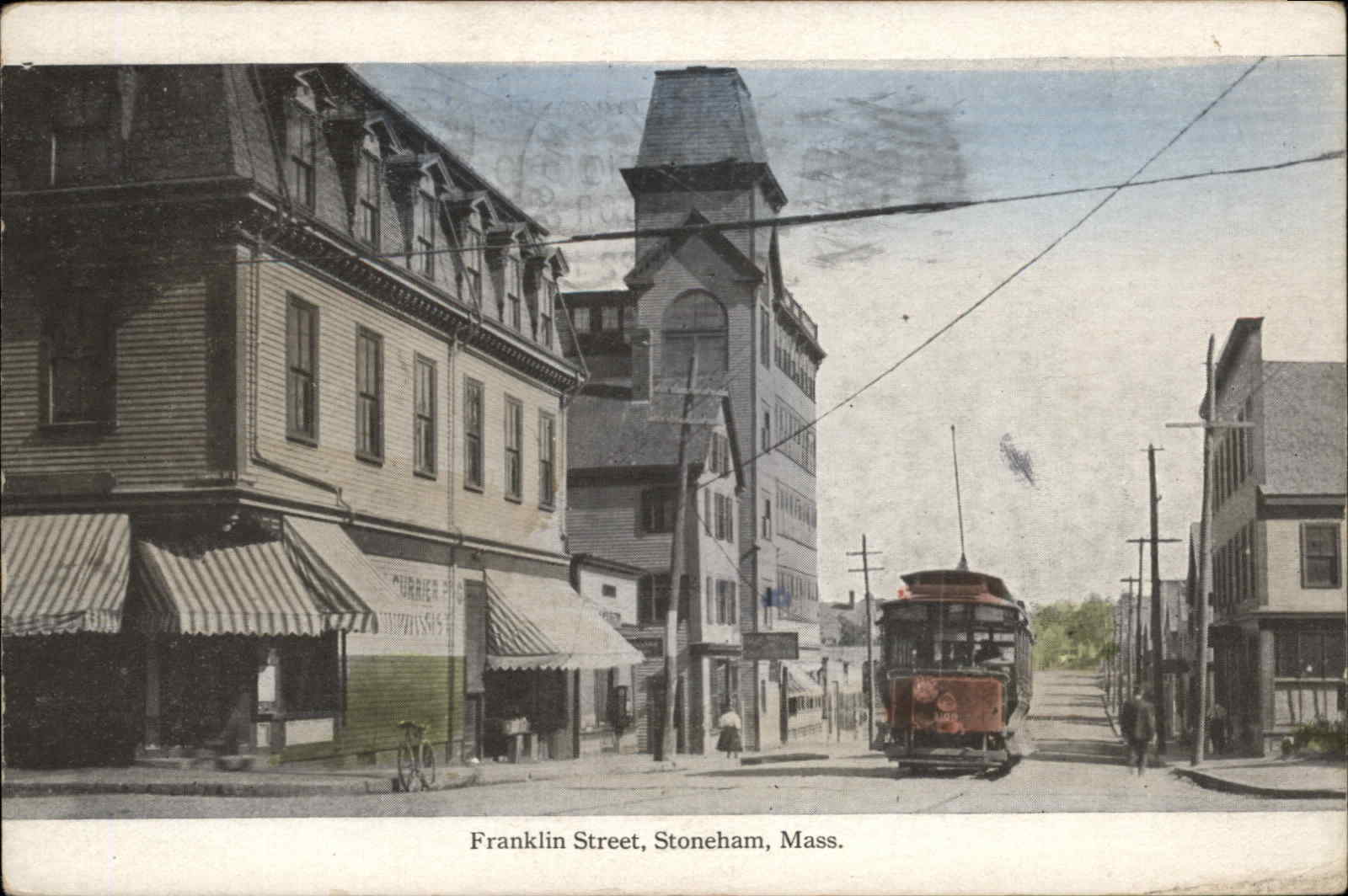
The building on an early-20th-century postcard

Stoneham's Oddfellows Building stands prominently facing the town's main square, at the northeast corner of the square with Franklin Street. It is a 2 1/2-story wood-frame building, with a dormered mansard roof providing a full third floor. Its square-facing facade originally had two storefronts, now combined into one, with entrances at angled corners. Another commercial space occupies a ground-floor space facing Franklin Street near the rear of the block. The exterior of the building is finished in stucco, possibly over original clapboards. The roof is finished in patterned slate, and has an embellished cornice. The roof dormers are generally topped by gables with partial returns and brackets; that at center of the main facade is more elaborate, including the carved date 1878.

The Second Empire style building was constructed in 1868 by Isaac Hersam, and is one of three such buildings dating to the mid-19th century that give the town's Central Square its character. It was acquired by a consortium of related Oddfellows organizations in 1878, and housed retail operations on the ground floor, and the Oddfellows meeting space above.

== See also ==
- National Register of Historic Places listings in Stoneham, Massachusetts
- National Register of Historic Places listings in Middlesex County, Massachusetts
