= Stoneham Public Library =

- U.S. National Register of Historic Places
- U.S. Historic district – Contributing property
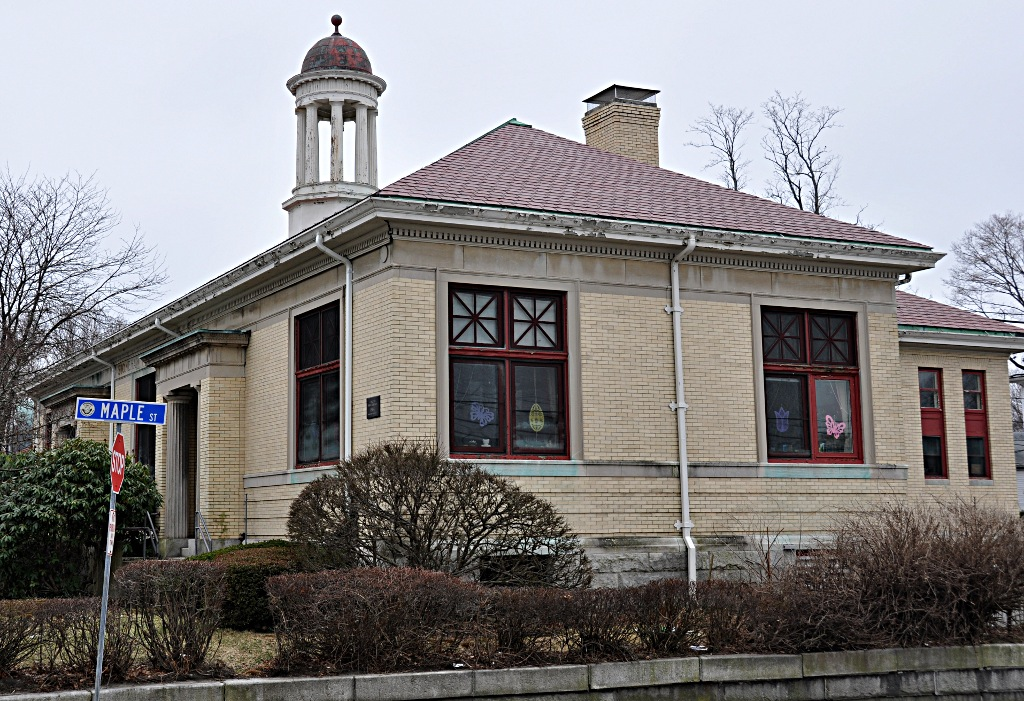

- Location within Massachusetts Location within the United States
- Location: Main and Maple Sts., Stoneham, Massachusetts
- Coordinates: 42°28′39″N 71°6′4″W
- Built: 1904
- Architectural style: Classical Revival
- Part of: Central Square Historic District (ID89002277)
- MPS: Stoneham MRA
- NRHP reference No.: 84002832

Significant dates
- Added to NRHP: April 13, 1984
- Designated CP: January 17, 1990

The Stoneham Public Library is the public library of Stoneham, Massachusetts. It is located at Main and Maple Streets.

== History ==
The library was founded in 1859 by a committee of leading citizens, initially renting space near the intersection of Main Street and Montvale Avenue. In two years the library had accumulated nearly 1,500 volumes, most donated by older private library groups. As the library expanded its holdings over the following decades, it relocated several times to ever-larger spaces. By 1878 the collection had grown to over 5,000 volumes.

In 1903 the town was awarded a grant of $15,000 by philanthropist Andrew Carnegie for the construction of a permanent library building. This resulted in the 1904 construction of the modest Classical Revival building that forms the heart of the library complex at Maple and Main Streets. As originally built, this was a single story building made of Roman brick, and capped by a hip roof. Its main entrance was slightly recessed in a square archway flanked by pilasters and topped by an entablature. In 1931 this building was extended from three to five bays, and a cupola was added thanks to a trust fund left to the library by Annie Hamilton Brown. The building was again enlarged in 1983, using the same building materials and retaining single story layout, but with modern styling. The building was listed on the National Register of Historic Places in 1984, and was included as a contributing property to the Central Square Historic District in 1990.

The library's services, in addition to its circulating book collection, include access to online databases. The library is a member of the North of Boston Library Exchange (NOBLE), through which cardholders can access resources of other libraries in the region.

== See also ==
- National Register of Historic Places listings in Stoneham, Massachusetts
- National Register of Historic Places listings in Middlesex County, Massachusetts
