= Central Square Historic District (Stoneham, Massachusetts) =

Historic district in Massachusetts, United States

- U.S. National Register of Historic Places
- U.S. Historic district
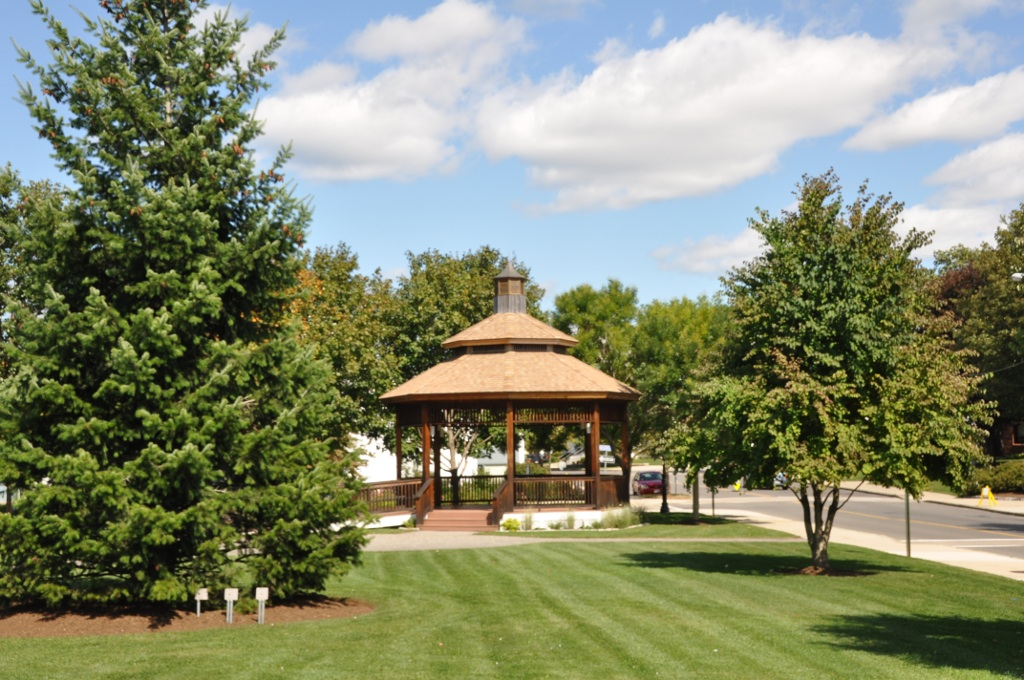

- Location within Massachusetts Location within the United States
- Location: Roughly bounded by Main, Central, Church, Winter and Common Sts., Stoneham, Massachusetts
- Coordinates: 42°28′15″N 71°5′57″W
- Architect: Tidd, William; Brown, Charles
- Architectural style: Mid 19th Century Revival, Classical Revival, Late Victorian
- MPS: Stoneham MRA
- NRHP reference No.: 89002277
- Added to NRHP: January 17, 1990

The Central Square Historic District is a historic district encompassing much of the central business district of Stoneham, Massachusetts. It includes the town's largest concentration of 19th and early-20th century commercial architecture, in an area that developed in importance as a commercial center after the construction of the Andover-Medford Turnpike (now Main Street, designated Massachusetts Route 28). The district was added to the National Register of Historic Places in 1990.

== Description and history ==
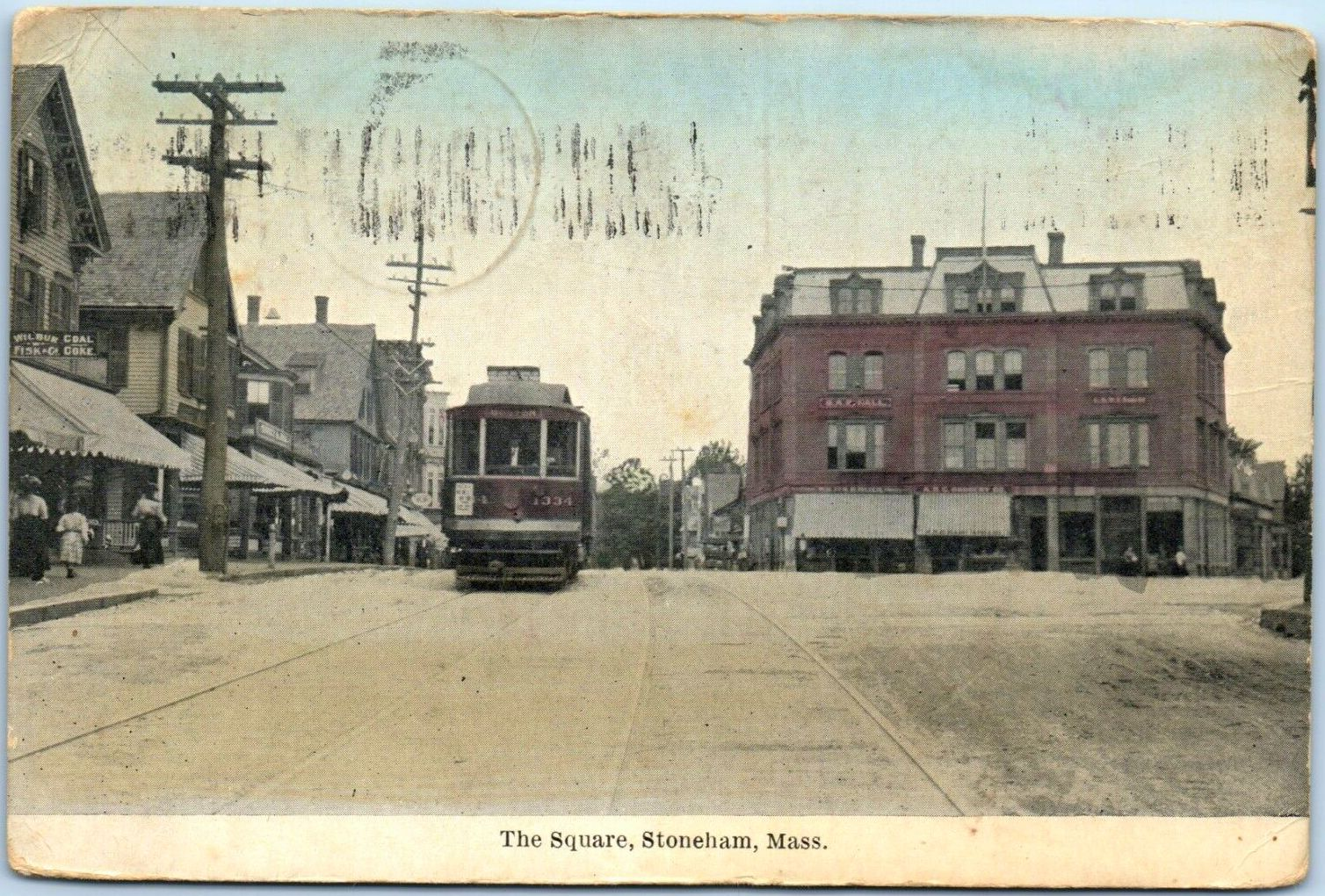
Early-20th-century postcard of the Dow Block

The town of Stoneham is located north of the city of Boston, and is now predominantly a commuter suburb. In the mid-19th century the town developed as a major center of shoemaking in the area, and was served by the Boston and Lowell Railroad and the turnpike heading north to Andover. The shoemaking enterprises began as small-scale enterprises, which gradually became centralized into larger operations. One factory remains from this period, the large 1858 Italianate building at 426 Main Street, which was built by John Hill and was the town's first major industrial building. The triangular junction of Main Street and Center Street became the commercial hub of the town, its character defined by three Second Empire buildings erected between 1868 and 1890: the Dow Block, the Oddfellows Building, and the Chase Block.

The southern end of the district is anchored by the Hill factory building and the 1904 Stoneham Public Library, just across Main Street. Just north of the square stand other municipal buildings, including the 1918 Central Firestation, and town hall, built in 1939 on the east side of Center Street. North of these buildings are a cluster of churches, marking the northern edge of the district at Common Street. These include the First Congregational Church (1840) and the First Unitarian Church (1869).

== See also ==
- National Register of Historic Places listings in Stoneham, Massachusetts
- National Register of Historic Places listings in Middlesex County, Massachusetts
