= Charles H. Lockhardt House =

Historic house in Massachusetts, United States

- U.S. National Register of Historic Places
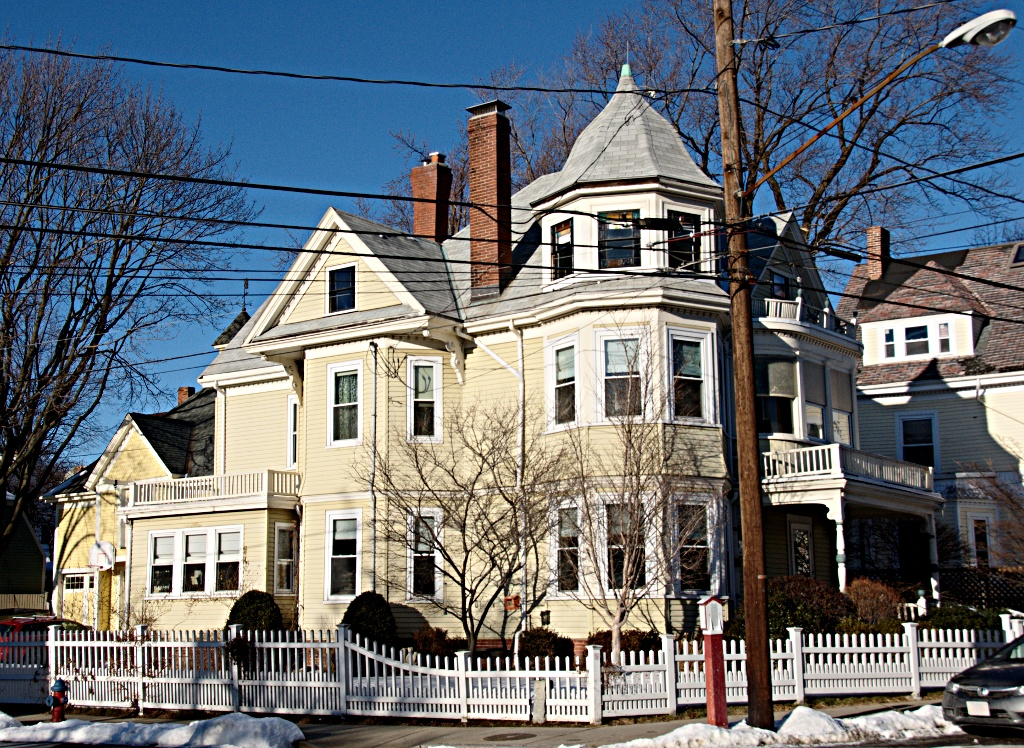

- Location within Massachusetts Location within the United States
- Location: 88 College Avenue, Somerville, Massachusetts
- Coordinates: 42°23′57.2452″N 71°7′10.8563″W
- Built: 1890
- Architectural style: Queen Anne
- MPS: Somerville MPS
- NRHP reference No.: 89001249
- Added to NRHP: September 18, 1989

The Charles H. Lockhardt House is a historic house in Somerville, Massachusetts, United States. Charles H. Lockhardt, a prosperous undertaker in Somerville, built this 2 1/2-story wood-frame Queen Anne style house in c. 1890. Its most prominent feature is its turret, a three-story polygonal projection from the southeast corner of the building, which is capped by a finial-topped roof. The property includes a period carriage house, which features a cupola.

The house was listed on the National Register of Historic Places in 1989.

== See also ==
- National Register of Historic Places listings in Somerville, Massachusetts
