= House at 5 Prospect Hill =

Historic house in Massachusetts, United States

- House at 5 Prospect Hill Avenue
- U.S. National Register of Historic Places
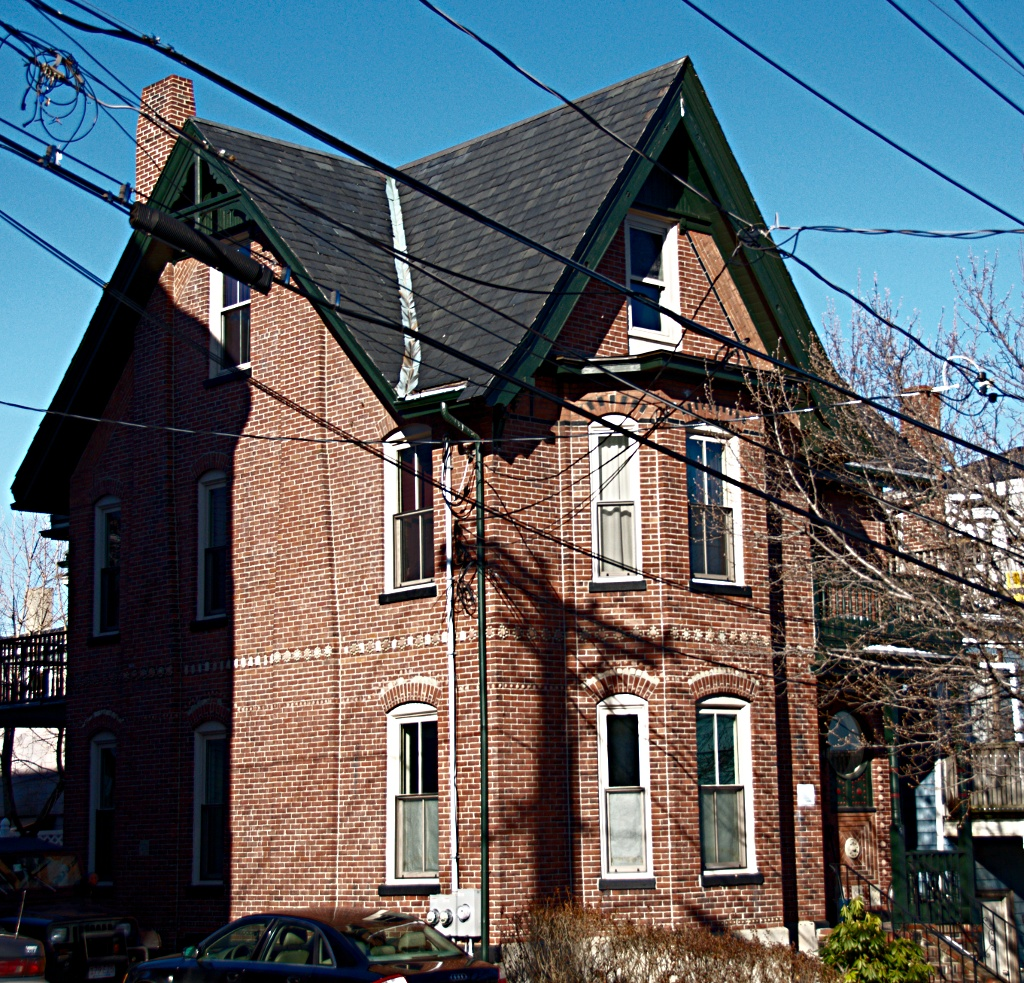

- Location within Massachusetts Location within the United States
- Location: 5 Prospect Hill, Somerville, Massachusetts
- Coordinates: 42°22′55.16″N 71°5′27.60″W
- Built: 1880
- Architectural style: Queen Anne
- MPS: Somerville MPS
- NRHP reference No.: 89001281
- Added to NRHP: September 18, 1989

The house at 5 Prospect Hill in Somerville, Massachusetts is rare in the city as a Queen Anne house executed in brick. Built c. 1880, it is a 2 1/2-story house with a side-gable roof and a projecting gable section on the left front. A polygonal bay projects further from this gable section, with windows set in segmented-arch openings with a band of polychrome brickwork between. A two-story porch extends from the side of the projecting section across the remainder of the front. Other details of the exterior include bargeboard accents in the gables, and terra cotta insets in the brickwork.

The house was listed on the National Register of Historic Places in 1989.

== See also ==
- National Register of Historic Places listings in Somerville, Massachusetts
