= Philemon Russell House =

Historic house in Massachusetts, United States

- U.S. National Register of Historic Places
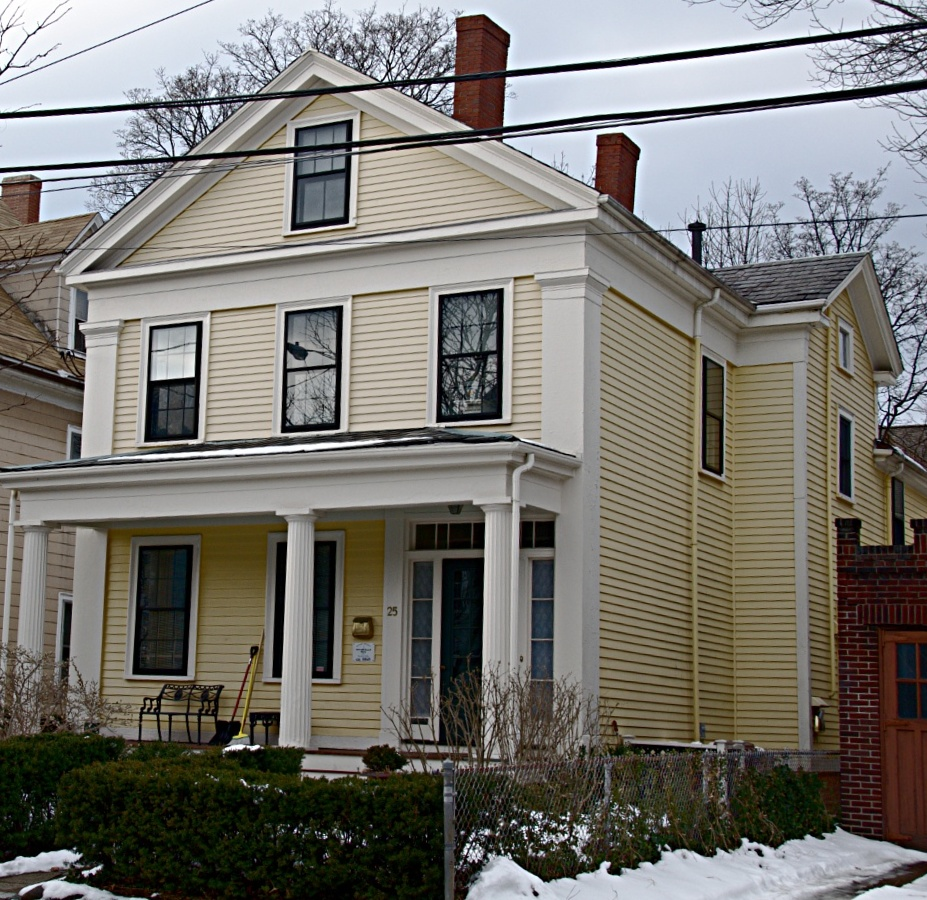

- Location within Massachusetts Location within the United States
- Location: 25 Russell Street, Somerville, Massachusetts
- Coordinates: 42°23′33.858″N 71°7′21.925″W
- Built: 1845
- Architectural style: Greek Revival
- MPS: Somerville MPS
- NRHP reference No.: 89001282
- Added to NRHP: September 18, 1989

The Philemon Russell House is a historic house in Somerville, Massachusetts, United States.

Philemon Robbins Russell was a farmer who owned 50 acres (20 ha) of apple orchards near Russell Street. This land was converted to house lots for development by Captain Gilman Sargent in 1845, creating Orchard Street, Russell Street, and Cottage Place. Russell's house, built in 1845, is one of the best-preserved side-hall Greek Revival farmhouses in the city.

According to the Somerville Journal, a fire occurred that badly damaged the upper portion of the house. The cause was a mystery, and the estimated damage was $2,000. The Boston Daily Globe reported the fire took place on February 26, 1905.

The house was listed on the National Register of Historic Places in 1989.

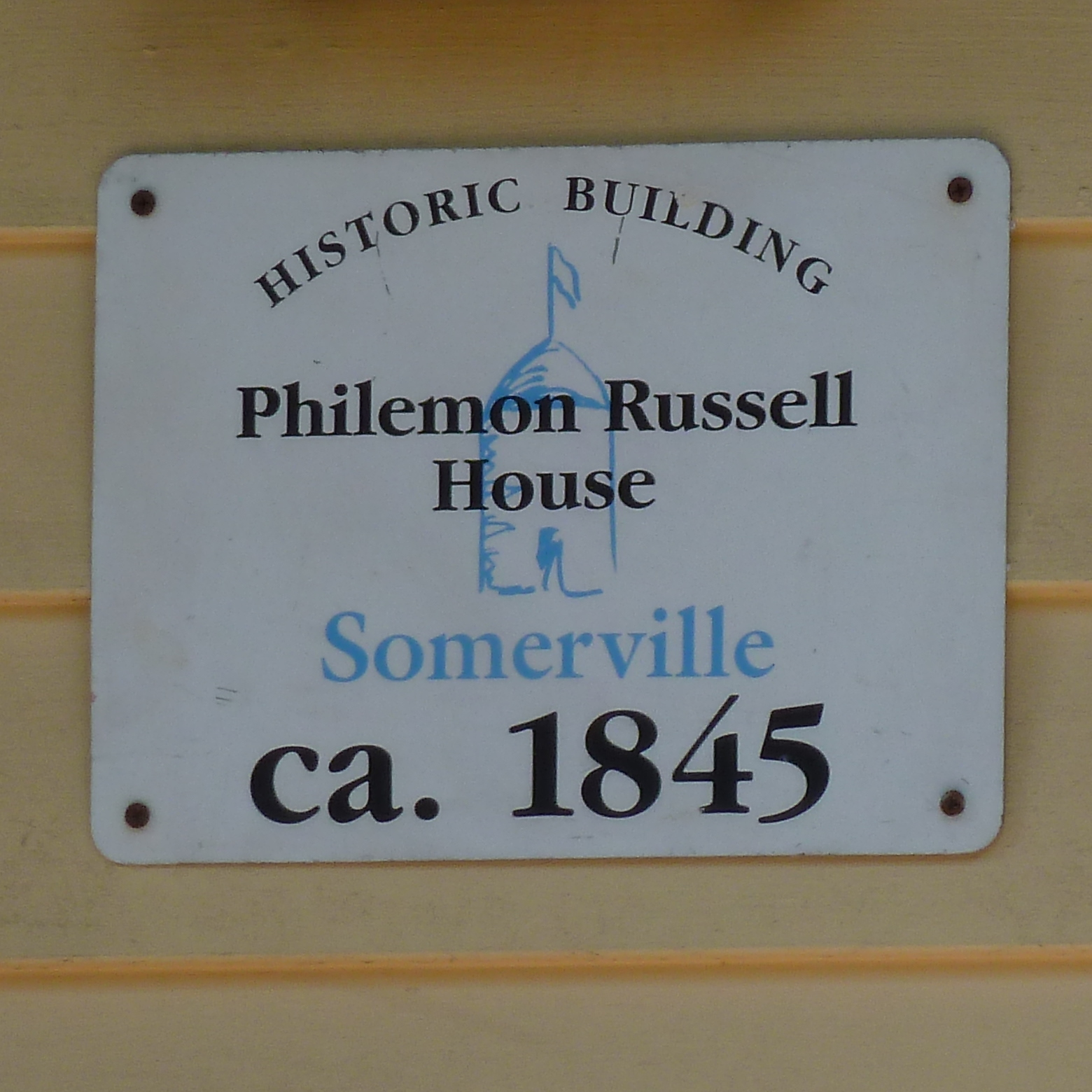
The identifying sign on the face of the Philemon Russell House

== See also ==
- National Register of Historic Places listings in Somerville, Massachusetts
