= Samuel Ireland House =

Historic house in Massachusetts, United States

- U.S. National Register of Historic Places
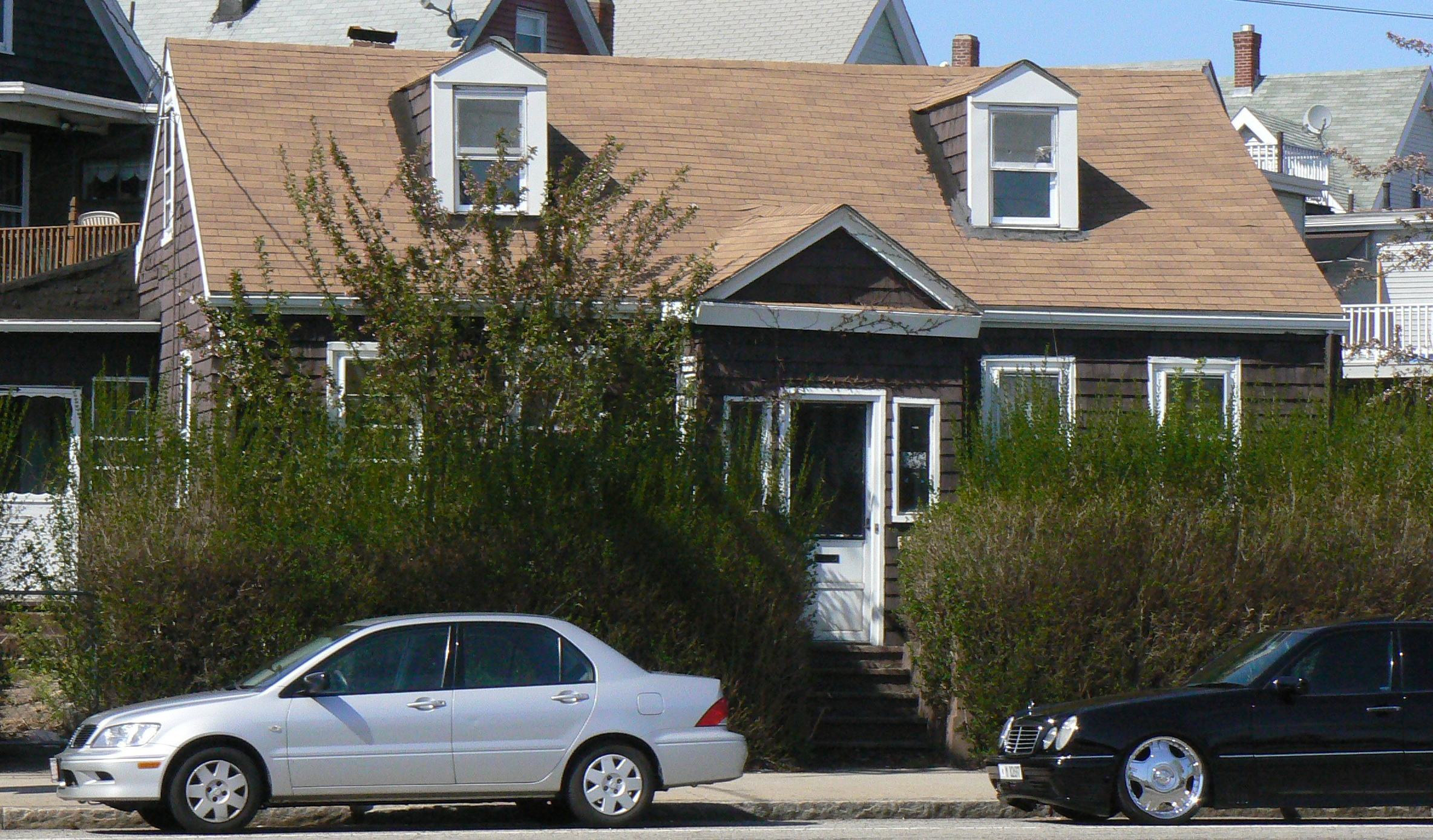

- Location within Massachusetts Location within the United States
- Location: 117 Washington St., Somerville, Massachusetts
- Coordinates: 42°22′52″N 71°5′15″W
- Built: 1792
- MPS: Somerville MPS
- NRHP reference No.: 89001299
- Added to NRHP: September 18, 1989

The Samuel Ireland House is a historic house in Somerville, Massachusetts. It is a 1 1/2-story vernacular cottage, five bays wide, with a side gable roof pierced by two dormers, and a projecting gable-roofed vestibule at the center of its front facade. The house was built c. 1792 by Samuel Ireland, a farmer. It is the oldest documented house in eastern Somerville, and one of the oldest in the city.

The house was listed on the National Register of Historic Places in 1989.

== See also ==
- National Register of Historic Places listings in Somerville, Massachusetts
