= House at 14 Chestnut Street =

Historic house in Massachusetts, United States

- U.S. National Register of Historic Places
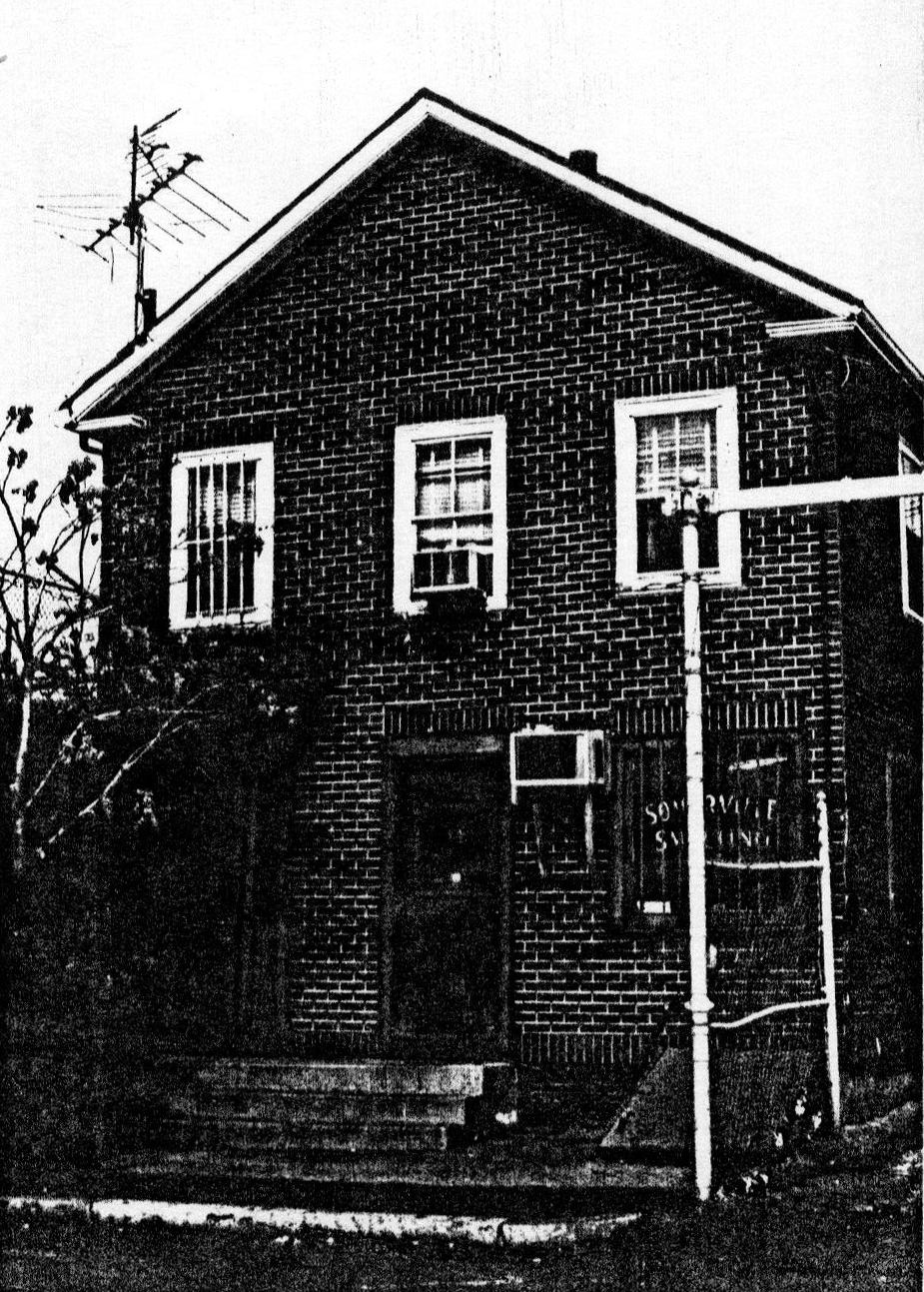
- c. 1988 photo

- Location within Massachusetts Location within the United States
- Location: 14 Chestnut St., Somerville, Massachusetts
- Coordinates: 42°22′39″N 71°5′9″W
- Built: 1860
- Architectural style: Italianate
- MPS: Somerville MPS
- NRHP reference No.: 89001245
- Added to NRHP: September 18, 1989

The House at 14 Chestnut Street in Somerville, Massachusetts, was one of the last residential structures in the Brickbottom area of the city. Built about 1860, it was a two-story wood-frame structure with Italianate style, with bracketed eaves and an elaborately decorated front door hood. The area where it stood was once lined with similar modestly scaled worker housing, most of which was demolished to turn the area into an industrial park.

The house was listed on the National Register of Historic Places in 1989, and demolished sometime thereafter.

== See also ==
- National Register of Historic Places listings in Somerville, Massachusetts
