= National Register of Historic Places listings in Somerville, Massachusetts =

Location of Somerville in Massachusetts

This is a list of properties and historic districts in Somerville, Massachusetts, that have been listed on the National Register of Historic Places.

The locations of National Register properties and districts (at least for all showing latitude and longitude coordinates below) may be seen in an online map by clicking on "Map of all coordinates".

This National Park Service list is complete through NPS recent listings posted October 30, 2026.

== Current listings ==
	Name on the Register	Image	Date listed	Location	City or town	Description
1	Adams-Magoun House	Adams-Magoun House	September 18, 1989 (#89001239)	438 Broadway; 42°23′46″N 71°06′03″W	Winter Hill	
2	Charles Adams-Woodbury Locke House	Charles Adams-Woodbury Locke House	September 18, 1989 (#89001240)	178 Central St. 42°23′39″N 71°05′59″W	Winter Hill	
3	Alewife Brook Parkway	Alewife Brook Parkway	March 13, 2004 (#04000249)	Alewife Brook Parkway; 42°24′34″N 71°07′50″W	West Somerville	Extends into Cambridge
4	Almshouse	Almshouse	April 13, 1982 (#82001908)	45 Matignon Road, Cambridge; 42°24′08″N 71°07′57″W		Property is mostly in Cambridge; building extends into Somerville.
5	Clifton Bacon House	Clifton Bacon House	September 18, 1989 (#89001244)	27 Chester St. 42°23′39″N 71°07′26″W	Davis Square	
6	Walter S. and Melissa E. Barnes House	Walter S. and Melissa E. Barnes House	March 8, 1990 (#89001266)	140 Highland Ave. 42°23′17″N 71°06′12″W	Central Hill	
7	Bow Street Historic District	Bow Street Historic District	March 26, 1976 (#76000274)	Bow St. 42°22′53″N 71°05′54″W	Union Square	
8	S. E. Brackett House	S. E. Brackett House	September 18, 1989 (#89001252)	63 Columbus Ave. 42°22′54″N 71°05′43″W	Prospect Hill	
9	Broadway Winter Hill Congregational Church	Broadway Winter Hill Congregational Church	September 18, 1989 (#89001238)	404 Broadway; 42°23′42″N 71°05′58″W	Winter Hill	
10	James H. Brooks House	James H. Brooks House	September 18, 1989 (#89001251)	61 Columbus Ave. 42°22′54″N 71°05′42″W	Prospect Hill	
11	Martin W. Carr School	Martin W. Carr School	July 5, 1984 (#84002530)	25 Atherton St. 42°23′05″N 71°06′28″W	Spring Hill	
12	Central Library	Central Library	September 18, 1989 (#89001274)	79 Highland Ave. 42°23′09″N 71°05′40″W	Central Hill	
13	Z. E. Cliff House	Z. E. Cliff House	September 18, 1989 (#89001280)	29 Powder House Terr. 42°23′59″N 71°07′00″W	Powder House	
14	Thomas Cook House	Thomas Cook House	September 18, 1989 (#89001250)	21 College Hill Rd. 42°24′32″N 71°07′44″W	West Somerville	
15	Cooper-Davenport Tavern Wing	Cooper-Davenport Tavern Wing	September 18, 1989 (#89001257)	81 Eustis St. 42°23′01″N 71°06′51″W	Ward 2	
16	C. C. Crowell House	C. C. Crowell House	September 18, 1989 (#89001236)	85 Benton Rd. 42°23′23″N 71°06′19″W	Spring Hill	
17	Downer Rowhouses (Adams Street)	Downer Rowhouses (Adams Street)	September 18, 1989 (#89001225)	55 Adams St. 42°23′40″N 71°06′01″W	Winter Hill	
18	Downer Rowhouses (Central Street)	Downer Rowhouses (Central Street)	September 18, 1989 (#89001241)	192–200 Central St. 42°23′41″N 71°05′59″W	Winter Hill	
19	First Unitarian Church	First Unitarian Church	September 18, 1989 (#89001264)	130 Highland Ave. 42°23′15″N 71°06′07″W	Central Hill	
20	First Universalist Church	First Universalist Church	September 18, 1989 (#89001262)	125 Highland Ave. 42°23′15″N 71°06′05″W	Central Hill	
21	Alexander Foster House	Alexander Foster House	September 18, 1989 (#89001270)	45 Laurel St. 42°23′04″N 71°06′15″W	Spring Hill	
22	Samuel Gaut House	Samuel Gaut House	September 18, 1989 (#89001265)	137 Highland Ave. 42°23′17″N 71°06′09″W	Central Hill	
23	The Grandview	The Grandview	September 18, 1989 (#89001275)	82 Munroe St. 42°22′56″N 71°05′42″W	Prospect Hill	
24	The Highland	The Highland	September 18, 1989 (#89001260)	66 Highland St. 42°23′13″N 71°05′55″W	Central Hill	
25	Hollander Blocks	Hollander Blocks	September 18, 1989 (#89001296)	Walnut St. and Pleasant Ave. 42°23′02″N 71°05′44″W	Prospect Hill	
26	Elisha Hopkins House	Elisha Hopkins House	September 18, 1989 (#89001284)	237 School St. 42°23′31″N 71°05′43″W	Winter Hill	
27	House at 5 Prospect Hill	House at 5 Prospect Hill	September 18, 1989 (#89001281)	5 Prospect Hill Avenue; 42°22′55″N 71°05′29″W	Prospect Hill	
28	House at 6 Kent Court	House at 6 Kent Court	September 18, 1989 (#89001269)	6 Kent Ct. 42°22′57″N 71°06′41″W	Ward 2	
29	House at 10 Arlington Street	House at 10 Arlington Street	September 18, 1989 (#89001230)	10 Arlington St. 42°23′09″N 71°04′57″W	East Somerville	
30	House at 14 Chestnut Street	House at 14 Chestnut Street	September 18, 1989 (#89001245)	14 Chestnut St. 42°22′29″N 71°05′11″W	Brickbottom	Building demolished
31	House at 16–18 Preston Road	House at 16–18 Preston Road	September 18, 1989 (#89001279)	16–18 Preston Rd. 42°23′01″N 71°06′08″W	Spring Hill	
32	House at 21 Dartmouth Street	House at 21 Dartmouth Street	September 18, 1989 (#89001255)	21 Dartmouth St. 42°23′27″N 71°05′50″W	Winter Hill	
33	House at 25 Clyde Street	House at 25 Clyde Street	September 18, 1989 (#89001247)	25 Clyde St. 42°23′41″N 71°06′33″W	Magoun Square	
34	Houses at 28–36 Beacon Street	Houses at 28–36 Beacon Street	September 18, 1989 (#89001232)	28–36 Beacon St. 42°22′31″N 71°06′12″W	Inman Square	
35	House at 29 Mt. Vernon Street	House at 29 Mt. Vernon Street	September 18, 1989 (#89001302)	29 Mt. Vernon St. 42°23′08″N 71°04′48″W	East Somerville	
36	House at 35 Temple Street	House at 35 Temple Street	September 18, 1989 (#89001288)	35 Temple St. 42°23′37″N 71°05′34″W	Ten Hills	
37	House at 42 Vinal Avenue	House at 42 Vinal Avenue	September 18, 1989 (#89001290)	42 Vinal Ave. 42°23′04″N 71°05′51″W	Prospect Hill	
38	House at 49 Vinal Avenue	House at 49 Vinal Avenue	September 18, 1989 (#89001292)	49 Vinal Ave. 42°23′05″N 71°05′49″W	Prospect Hill	
39	House at 72R Dane Street	House at 72R Dane Street	September 18, 1989 (#89001254)	72R Dane St. 42°22′34″N 71°06′16″W	Perry Park	
40	House at 81 Pearl Street	House at 81 Pearl Street	September 18, 1989 (#89001277)	81 Pearl St. 42°23′05″N 71°05′06″W	East Somerville	
41	House at 197 Morrison Avenue	House at 197 Morrison Avenue	September 18, 1989 (#89001273)	197 Morrison Ave. 42°23′51″N 71°07′10″W	Davis Square	
42	House at 343 Highland Avenue	House at 343 Highland Avenue	September 18, 1989 (#89001267)	343 Highland Ave. 42°23′39″N 71°06′59″W	Powder House	
43	Samuel Ireland House	Samuel Ireland House	September 18, 1989 (#89001299)	117 Washington; 42°22′52″N 71°05′15″W	East Somerville	
44	Joseph K. James House	Joseph K. James House	February 11, 1998 (#98000095)	83 Belmont St. 42°23′18″N 71°06′30″W	Spring Hill	
45	Amos Keyes House	Amos Keyes House	September 18, 1989 (#89001224)	12 Adams St. 42°23′37″N 71°06′06″W	Magoun Square	
46	R. A. Knight-Eugene Lacount House	R. A. Knight-Eugene Lacount House	September 18, 1989 (#89001256)	34 Day St. 42°23′43″N 71°07′26″W	Davis Square	
47	Langmaid Building	Langmaid Building	September 18, 1989 (#89001259)	48–52 Highland Ave. 42°23′07″N 71°05′45″W	Central Hill	
48	Langmaid Terrace	Langmaid Terrace	September 18, 1989 (#89001237)	359–365 Broadway; 42°23′39″N 71°05′47″W	Ten Hills	
49	Charles H. Lockhardt House	Charles H. Lockhardt House	September 18, 1989 (#89001249)	88 College Ave. 42°23′57″N 71°07′11″W	Davis Square	
50	George Loring House	George Loring House	September 18, 1989 (#89001263)	76 Highland Ave. 42°23′10″N 71°05′51″W	Central Hill	
51	A. L. Lovejoy House	A. L. Lovejoy House	September 18, 1989 (#89001297)	30 Warren Ave. 42°22′53″N 71°05′45″W	Prospect Hill	
52	Middlesex Canal Historic and Archaeological District	Middlesex Canal Historic and Archaeological District	November 19, 2009 (#09000936)	Numerous locations along the historic route of the Middlesex Canal; 42°25′02″N 71°07′49″W	West Somerville; Ten Hills; East Somerville	Extends into other Middlesex County communities and Boston in Suffolk County.
53	Mt. Vernon Street Historic District	Mt. Vernon Street Historic District	September 18, 1989 (#89001223)	8–24 Mt. Vernon St. 42°23′08″N 71°04′47″W	East Somerville	
54	Robert Munroe House	Robert Munroe House	September 18, 1989 (#89001294)	37 Walnut St. 42°22′57″N 71°05′46″W	Prospect Hill	
55	Mystic Pumping Station	Mystic Pumping Station	January 18, 1990 (#89002255)	Alewife Brook Parkway; 42°24′54″N 71°07′52″W	West Somerville	Listing duplicates Mystic Water Works, below.
56	Mystic Valley Parkway, Metropolitan Park System of Greater Boston MPS	Mystic Valley Parkway, Metropolitan Park System of Greater Boston MPS	January 18, 2006 (#05001529)	Mystic Valley Parkway; 42°25′47″N 71°07′49″W	West Somerville	Also in Arlington, Medford, and Winchester
57	Mystic Water Works	Mystic Water Works	September 18, 1989 (#89001227)	Alewife Brook Parkway and Capen St. 42°24′54″N 71°07′52″W	West Somerville	Listing duplicates Mystic Pumping Station, above.
58	John F. Nichols House	John F. Nichols House	September 18, 1989 (#89001285)	17 Summit St. 42°24′00″N 71°07′11″W	Davis Square	
59	Louville V. Niles House	Louville V. Niles House	September 18, 1989 (#89001276)	97 Munroe St. 42°22′59″N 71°05′44″W	Prospect Hill	
60	Louville Niles House	Louville Niles House	September 18, 1989 (#89001295)	45 Walnut St. 42°22′59″N 71°05′45″W	Prospect Hill	
61	Old Cemetery	Old Cemetery	September 18, 1989 (#89001301)	Somerville Ave. and School St. 42°22′53″N 71°06′25″W	Union Square	
62	Otis-Wyman House	Otis-Wyman House	September 18, 1989 (#89001289)	67 Thurston St. 42°23′31″N 71°05′51″W	Winter Hill	
63	Parker-Burnett House	Parker-Burnett House	September 18, 1989 (#89001291)	48 Vinal Ave. 42°23′05″N 71°05′51″W	Prospect Hill	
64	Powder House Park	Powder House Park	April 21, 1975 (#75000287)	Powder House Circle; 42°24′01″N 71°07′02″W	Powder House	
65	Gustavus G. Prescott House	Gustavus G. Prescott House	September 18, 1989 (#89001278)	65–67 Perkins St. 42°23′03″N 71°04′45″W	East Somerville	
66	The Rosebud	The Rosebud	September 22, 1999 (#99001125)	381 Summer St. 42°23′40″N 71°07′17″W	Davis Square	
67	Philemon Russell House	Philemon Russell House	September 18, 1989 (#89001282)	25 Russell St. 42°23′34″N 71°07′22″W	Davis Square	
68	Susan Russell House	Susan Russell House	September 18, 1989 (#89001286)	58 Sycamore St. 42°23′24″N 71°06′04″W	Winter Hill	
69	Charles Schuebeler House	Charles Schuebeler House	September 18, 1989 (#89001298)	384 Washington St. 42°22′31″N 71°06′15″W	Perry Park	
70	Lemuel Snow Jr. House	Lemuel Snow Jr. House	September 18, 1989 (#89001234)	81 Benton Rd. 42°23′22″N 71°06′20″W	Spring Hill	
71	Somerville High School	Somerville High School	September 18, 1989 (#89001261)	93 Highland St. 42°23′13″N 71°05′55″W	Central Hill	Building is now the Somerville City Hall
72	Somerville Journal Building	Somerville Journal Building	September 18, 1989 (#89001300)	8–10 Walnut St. 42°22′53″N 71°05′51″W	Union Square	
73	Somerville Theatre	Somerville Theatre	January 26, 1990 (#89002330)	55 Davis Sq. 42°23′48″N 71°07′22″W	Davis Square	
74	Spring Hill Historic District	Spring Hill Historic District	September 18, 1989 (#89001222)	Roughly bounded by Summer, Central, Atherton, and Spring; 42°23′07″N 71°06′29″W	Spring Hill	
75	Peter and Oliver Tufts House	Peter and Oliver Tufts House	September 18, 1989 (#89001287)	78 Sycamore St. 42°23′27″N 71°06′02″W	Winter Hill	
76	US Post Office-Somerville Main	US Post Office-Somerville Main	May 30, 1986 (#86001247)	237 Washington St. 42°22′47″N 71°05′39″W	Union Square	
77	H. Warren House	H. Warren House	September 18, 1989 (#89001283)	205 School St. 42°23′25″N 71°05′47″W	Winter Hill	
78	West Somerville Branch Library	West Somerville Branch Library	September 18, 1989 (#89001248)	40 College Ave. 42°23′53″N 71°07′18″W	Davis Square	
79	Westwood Road Historic District		September 18, 1989 (#89001221)	Roughly bounded by Summer St., Benton Rd., Westwood Rd., and Central St. 42°23′12″N 71°06′21″W	Somerville	
80	Charles Williams House	Charles Williams House	September 18, 1989 (#89001253)	108 Cross St. 42°23′03″N 71°05′22″W	East Somerville	
81	Charles Williams Jr. House	Charles Williams Jr. House	September 18, 1989 (#89001228)	1 Arlington St. 42°23′09″N 71°04′55″W	East Somerville	
82	F. G. Williams House	F. G. Williams House	September 18, 1989 (#89001226)	37 Albion St. 42°23′26″N 71°06′18″W	Central Hill	
83	Daniel Worthen House	Daniel Worthen House	September 18, 1989 (#89001272)	8 Mt. Pleasant St. 42°23′07″N 71°04′43″W	East Somerville	
84	Wright House	Wright House	September 18, 1989 (#89001293)	54 Vinal Ave. 42°23′06″N 71°05′51″W	Prospect Hill	
85	George Wyatt House	George Wyatt House	September 18, 1989 (#89001233)	33 Beacon St. 42°22′31″N 71°06′09″W	Inman Square	

== See also ==
- Blue plaque
- List of National Historic Landmarks in Massachusetts
- National Register of Historic Places listings in Massachusetts
- National Register of Historic Places listings in Middlesex County, Massachusetts
