= House at 6 Kent Court =

Historic house in Massachusetts, United States

- U.S. National Register of Historic Places
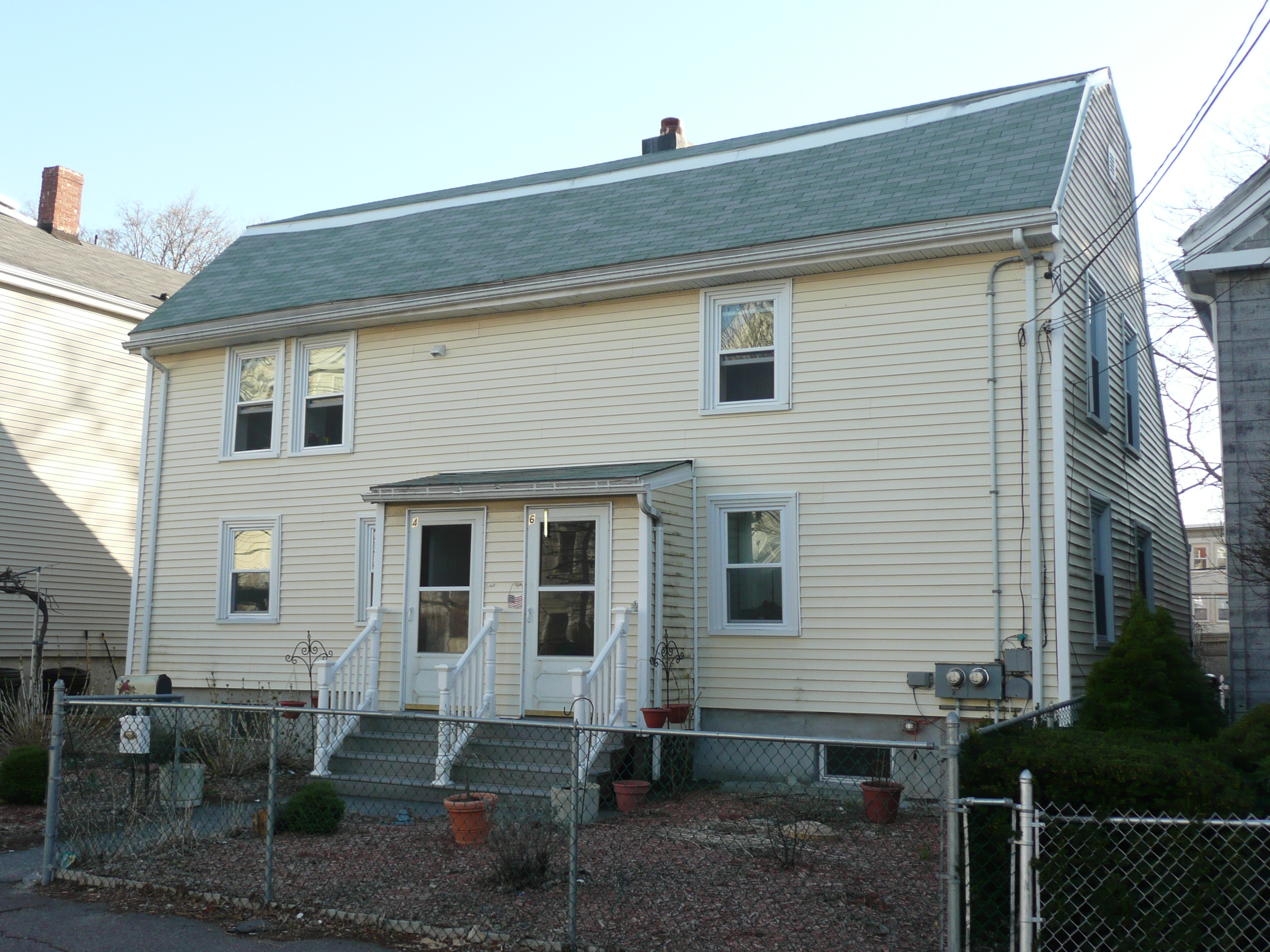

- Location within Massachusetts Location within the United States
- Location: 6 Kent Ct., Somerville, Massachusetts
- Coordinates: 42°22′57.65″N 71°6′38.92″W
- Built: 1750
- Architectural style: Georgian
- MPS: Somerville MPS
- NRHP reference No.: 89001269
- Added to NRHP: September 18, 1989

The house at 6 Kent Court is a historic colonial-era house in Somerville, Massachusetts. The Georgian style house was built in 1750, and is one of the oldest buildings in the city. It is known that there were a number of houses in this area, but it is likely that this house was moved, possible from Somerville Avenue, around the turn of the 20th century. The house's age is in part recognizable by its steeply pitched gambrel roof; it also has a typical colonial-era leanto addition on the rear.

The house was listed on the National Register of Historic Places in 1989.

== See also ==
- National Register of Historic Places listings in Somerville, Massachusetts
