= Walter J. Squire House =

Historic house in Massachusetts, United States

- House at 10 Arlington Street
- U.S. National Register of Historic Places
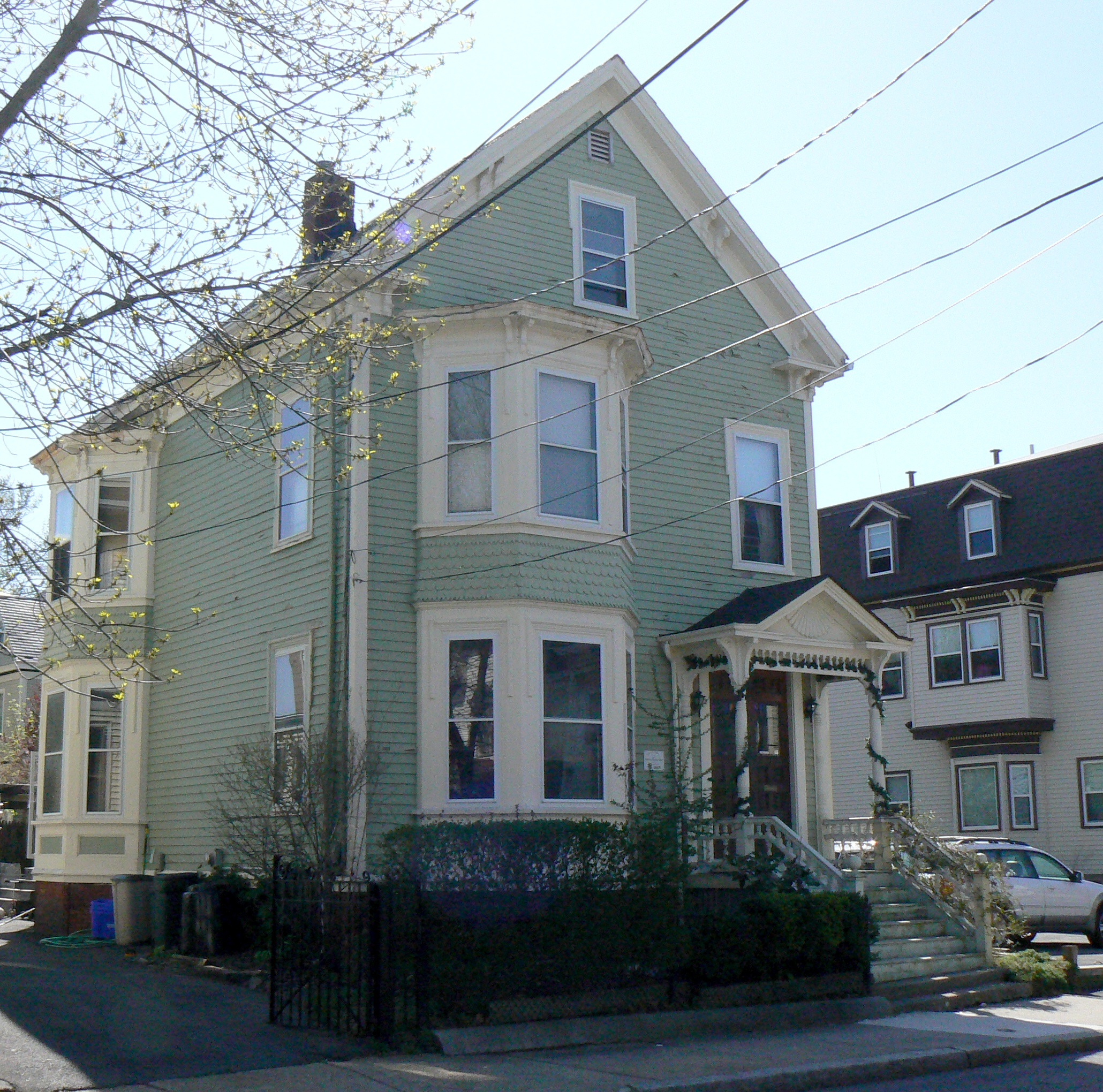

- Location within Massachusetts Location within the United States
- Location: 10 Arlington St., Somerville, Massachusetts
- Coordinates: 42°23′10″N 71°4′56″W
- Built: 1885
- Architectural style: Italianate, Queen Anne
- MPS: Somerville MPS
- NRHP reference No.: 89001230
- Added to NRHP: September 18, 1989

The Walter J. Squire House in Somerville, Massachusetts is a well-preserved transitional Italianate/Queen Anne house. The basic 2 1/2-story, front-gable, three-bay side entrance layout was fairly typical for Italianate houses in the city, as are the paired cornice brackets and hoods over the windows. The porch, however, has Queen Anne elements, including turned posts and the rising sun motif on its gable.

In 1989 the house was listed on the National Register of Historic Places as the House at 10 Arlington Street.

== Gallery ==
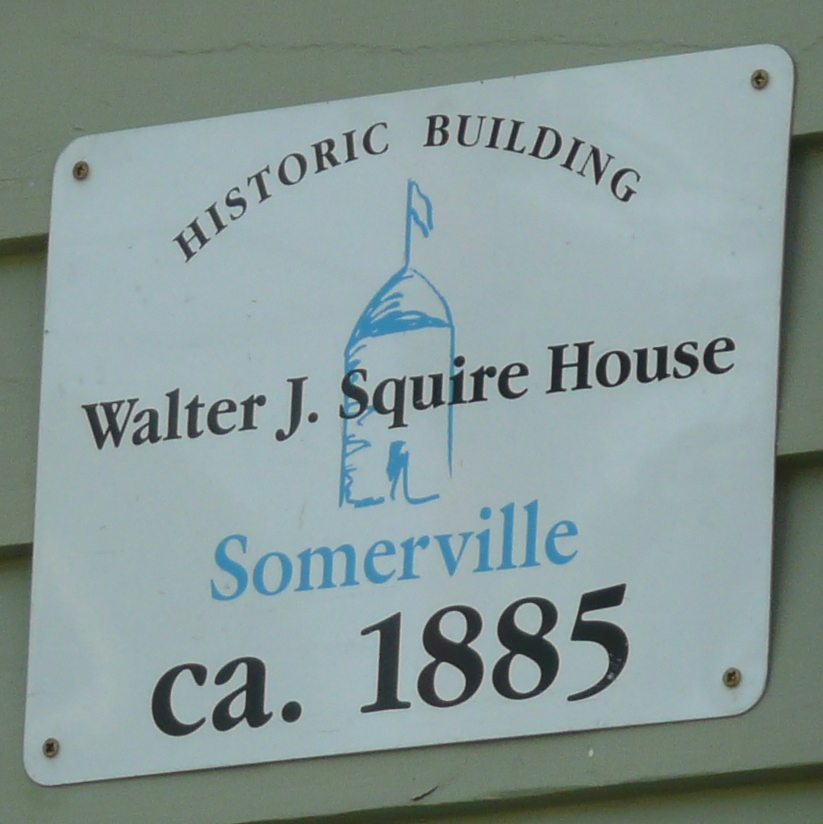
The historical marker sign on the face of the House at 10 Arlington Street

== See also ==
- National Register of Historic Places listings in Somerville, Massachusetts
