= A. L. Lovejoy House =

Historic house in Massachusetts, United States

- U.S. National Register of Historic Places
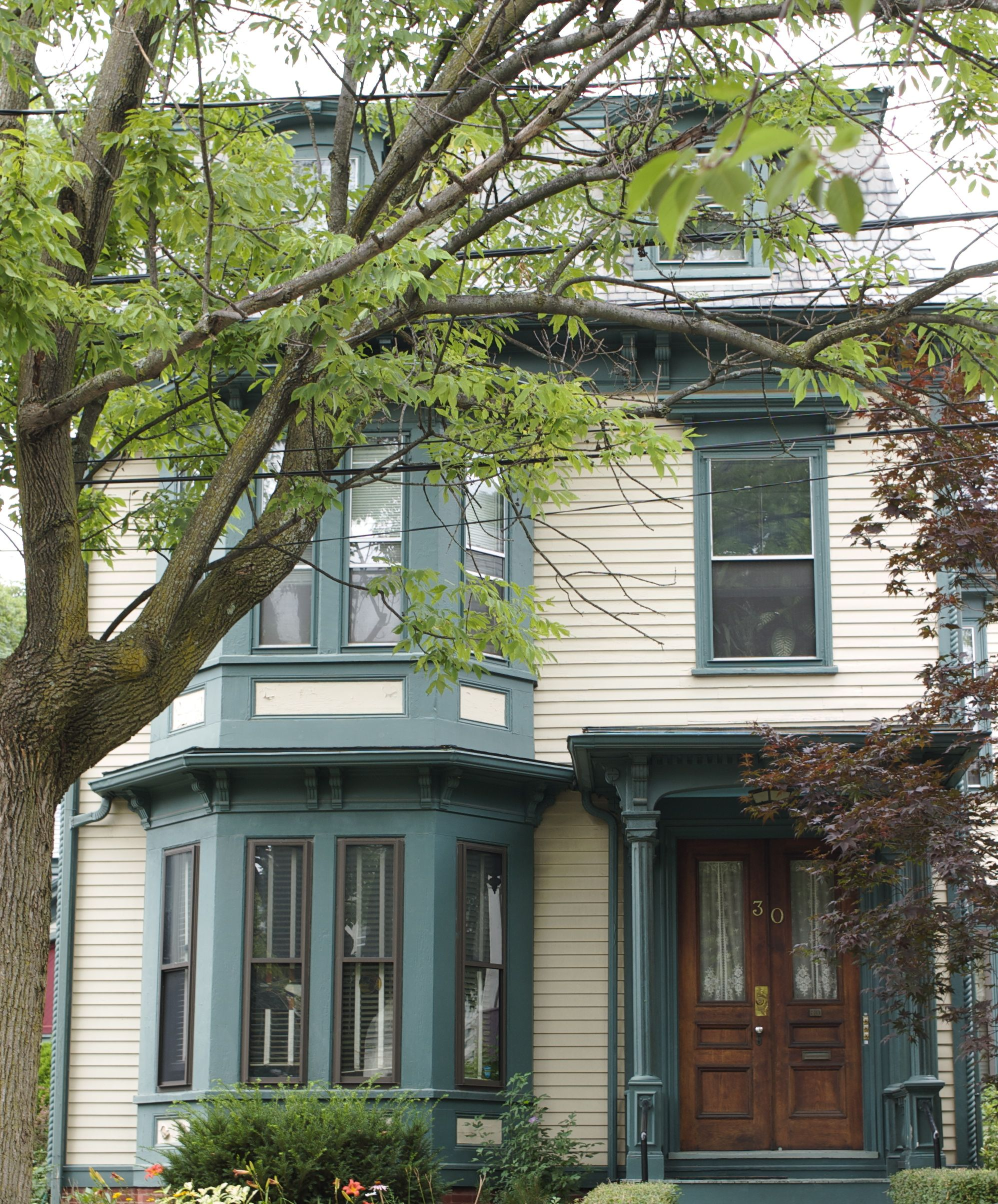

- Location within Massachusetts Location within the United States
- Location: 30 Warren Avenue, Somerville, Massachusetts
- Coordinates: 42°22′53.90″N 71°5′43.12″W
- Built: 1871
- Architectural style: Second Empire
- MPS: Somerville MPS
- NRHP reference No.: 89001297
- Added to NRHP: September 18, 1989

The A. L. Lovejoy House is a historic house in Somerville, Massachusetts. The three-story wood-frame Second Empire house was built in the early 1870s for Alvan Lovejoy, a Boston "fancy goods" dealer who probably commuted using either the street car or steam rail that served Union Square. The house has a typical Second Empire mansard roof clad in polychrome slate. Windows are decorated with hoods, and there are decorative brackets on the front entry porch, the roof cornice, and the roof of the projecting front bay.

The house was listed on the National Register of Historic Places in 1989.

== See also ==
- National Register of Historic Places listings in Somerville, Massachusetts
