= House at 81 Pearl Street =

Historic house in Massachusetts, United States

- U.S. National Register of Historic Places
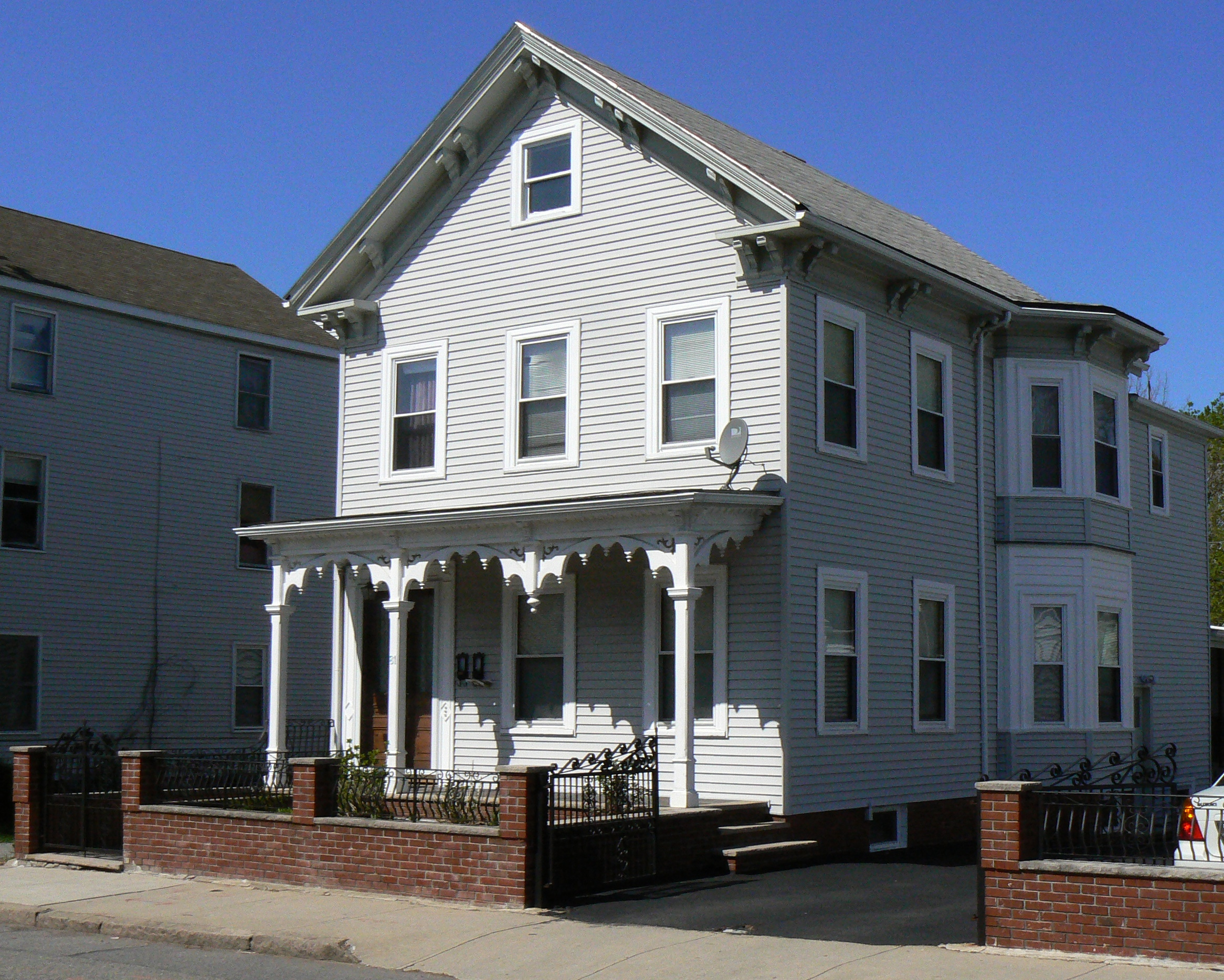

- Location within Massachusetts Location within the United States
- Location: 81 Pearl St., Somerville, Massachusetts
- Coordinates: 42°23′5″N 71°5′6″W
- Built: 1860
- Architectural style: Italianate
- MPS: Somerville MPS
- NRHP reference No.: 89001277
- Added to NRHP: September 18, 1989

The house at 81 Pearl Street in Somerville, Massachusetts is a well-preserved Italianate house. The 2 1/2-story wood-frame house was built c. 1860, and features a deep front gable with paired decorative brackets, and a front porch supported by square columns, with an unusual scalloped-arch cornice trim. It is among the best-preserved of the period worker housing built in East Somerville at that time. An early occupant was Benjamin Gage, a machinist.

The house was listed on the National Register of Historic Places in 1989.

== See also ==
- National Register of Historic Places listings in Somerville, Massachusetts
