= Amos Keyes House =

Historic house in Massachusetts, United States

- U.S. National Register of Historic Places
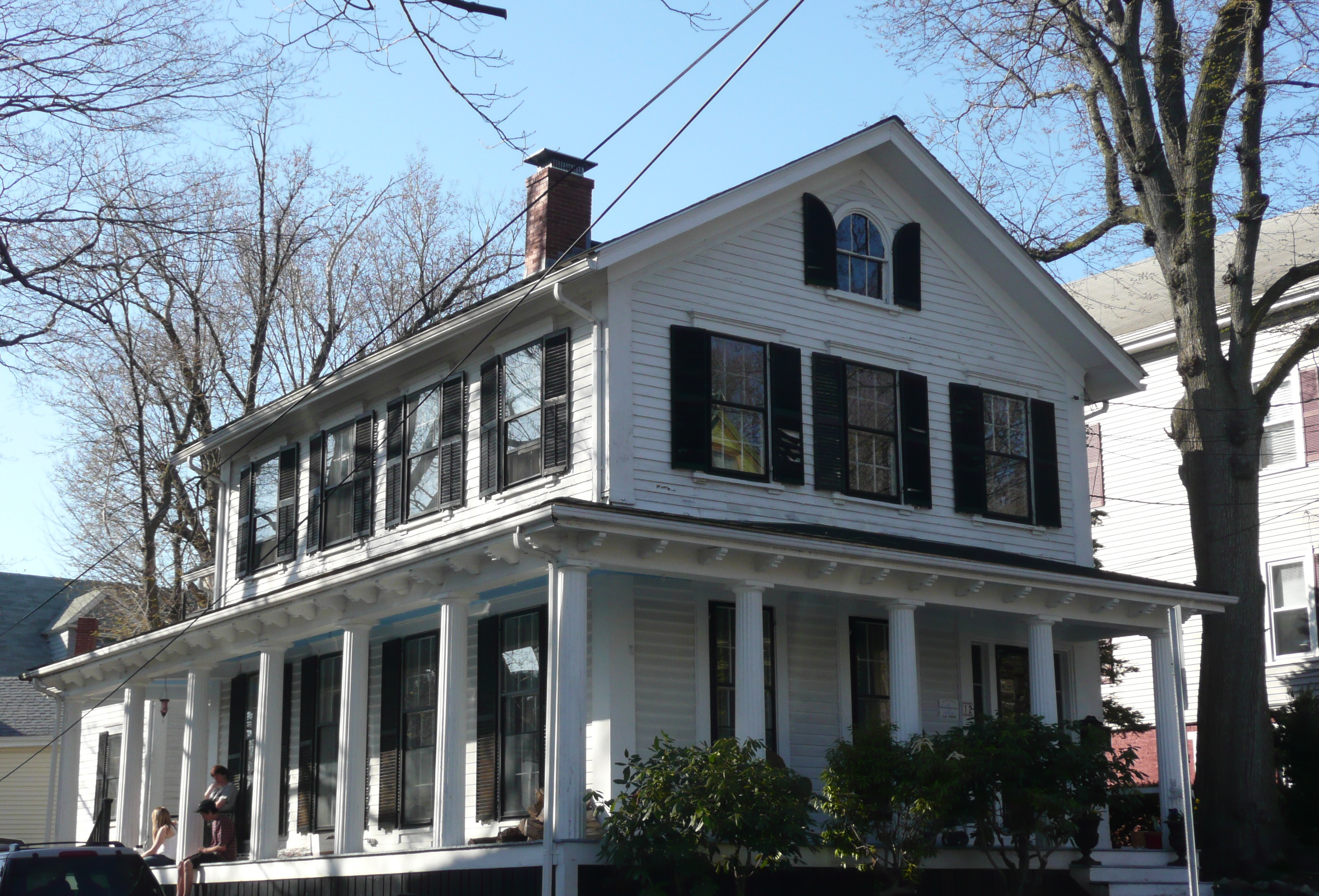

- Location within Massachusetts Location within the United States
- Location: 12 Adams Street, Somerville, Massachusetts
- Coordinates: 42°23′37″N 71°6′6″W
- Built: 1860
- Architectural style: Greek Revival, Italianate
- MPS: Somerville MPS
- NRHP reference No.: 89001224
- Added to NRHP: September 18, 1989

The Amos Keyes House is a historic house in Somerville, Massachusetts. This 2 1/2-story wood-frame house was built c. 1860 by Amos Keyes, a produce dealer. It was originally located on Central Street, but was moved to this location c. 1870 when Keyes sought to build a larger house on the other site. This house exhibits both Greek Revival and Italianate features: the round arch window in the gable is a typical Italianate detail, but the side-hall three-bay layout of the house is Greek Revival, as is the Doric porch.

The house was listed on the National Register of Historic Places in 1989.

== Gallery ==
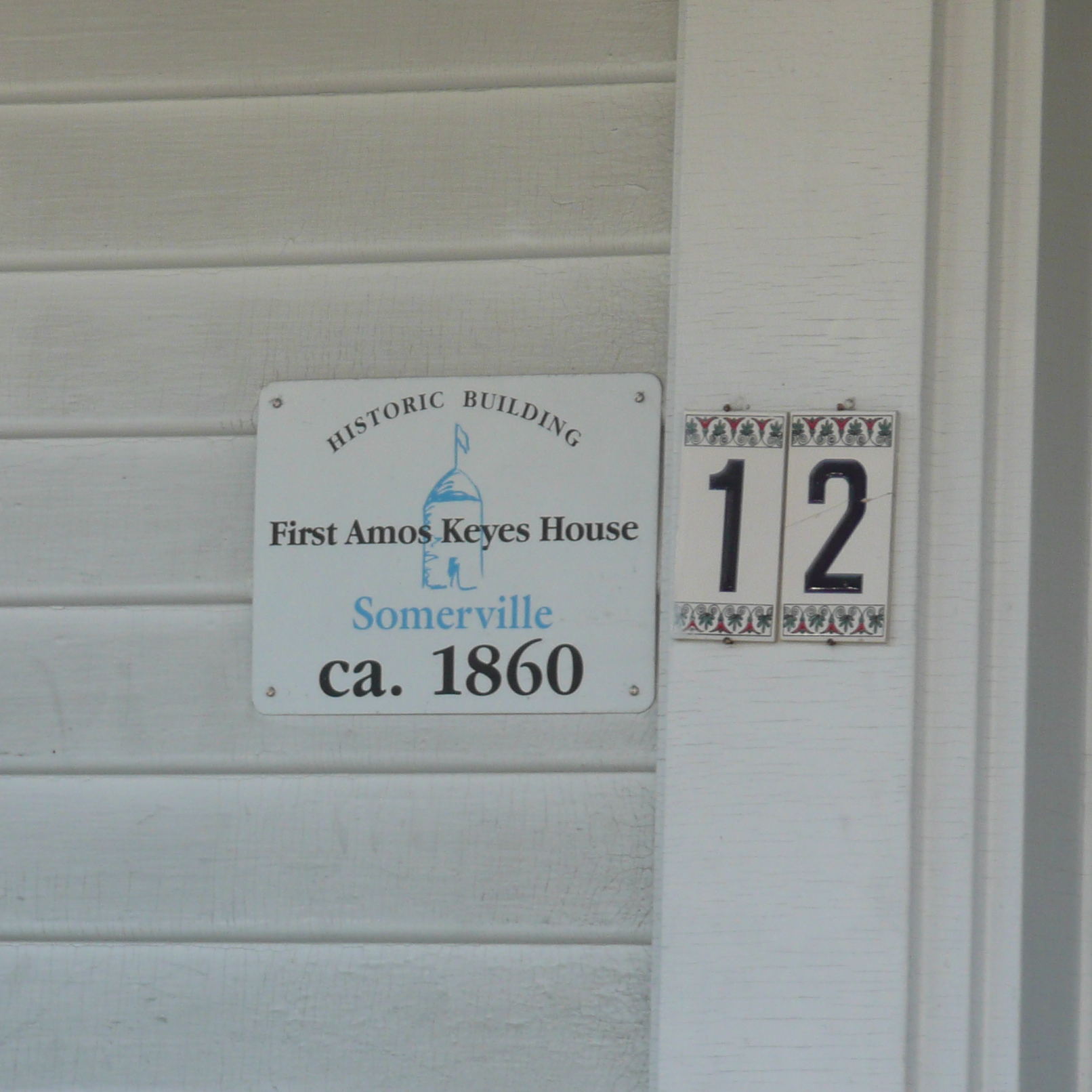
The identifying sign on the face of the Amos Keyes House

== See also ==
- National Register of Historic Places listings in Somerville, Massachusetts
