= Hollander Blocks =

Historic house in Massachusetts, United States

- U.S. National Register of Historic Places
- U.S. Historic district
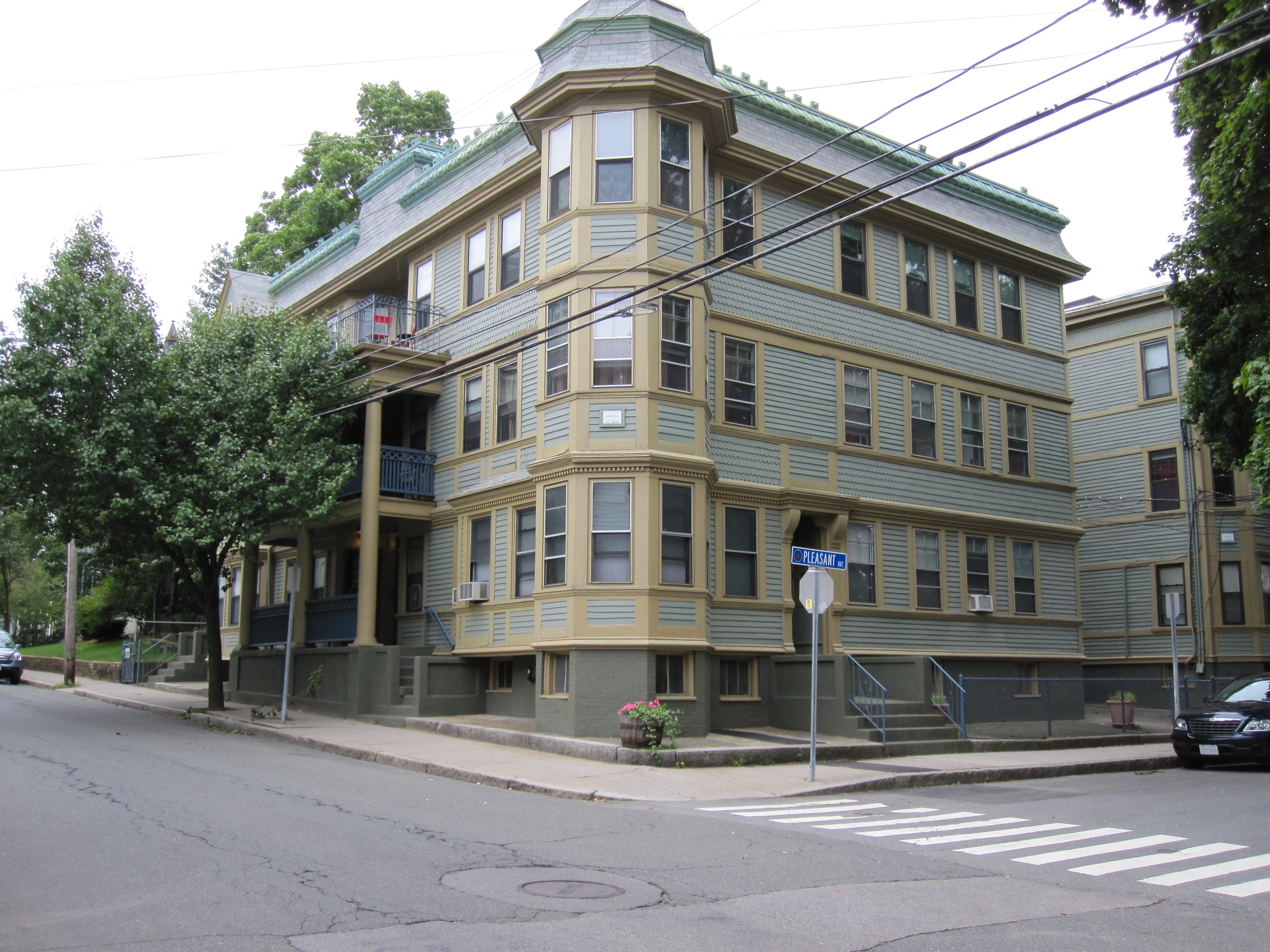

- Location within Massachusetts Location within the United States
- Location: 56–58 Walnut Street and 4–6 Pleasant Avenue, Somerville, Massachusetts
- Coordinates: 42°23′2.36″N 71°5′42.61″W
- Built: 1890
- Architectural style: Queen Anne
- MPS: Somerville MPS
- NRHP reference No.: 89001296
- Added to NRHP: September 18, 1989

The Hollander Blocks are a pair of historic apartment houses in Somerville, Massachusetts. The two adjacent buildings were constructed in the early 1890s by Clarence T. Hollander on land that had been subdivided in the 1870s, and purchased by his father as an investment. The properties (one with 10 units, the other 12) stand out in a neighborhood otherwise dominated by single family residences.

The buildings were listed as a historic district on the National Register of Historic Places in 1989.

== See also ==
- National Register of Historic Places listings in Somerville, Massachusetts
