= House at 343 Highland Avenue =

Historic house in Massachusetts, United States

- U.S. National Register of Historic Places
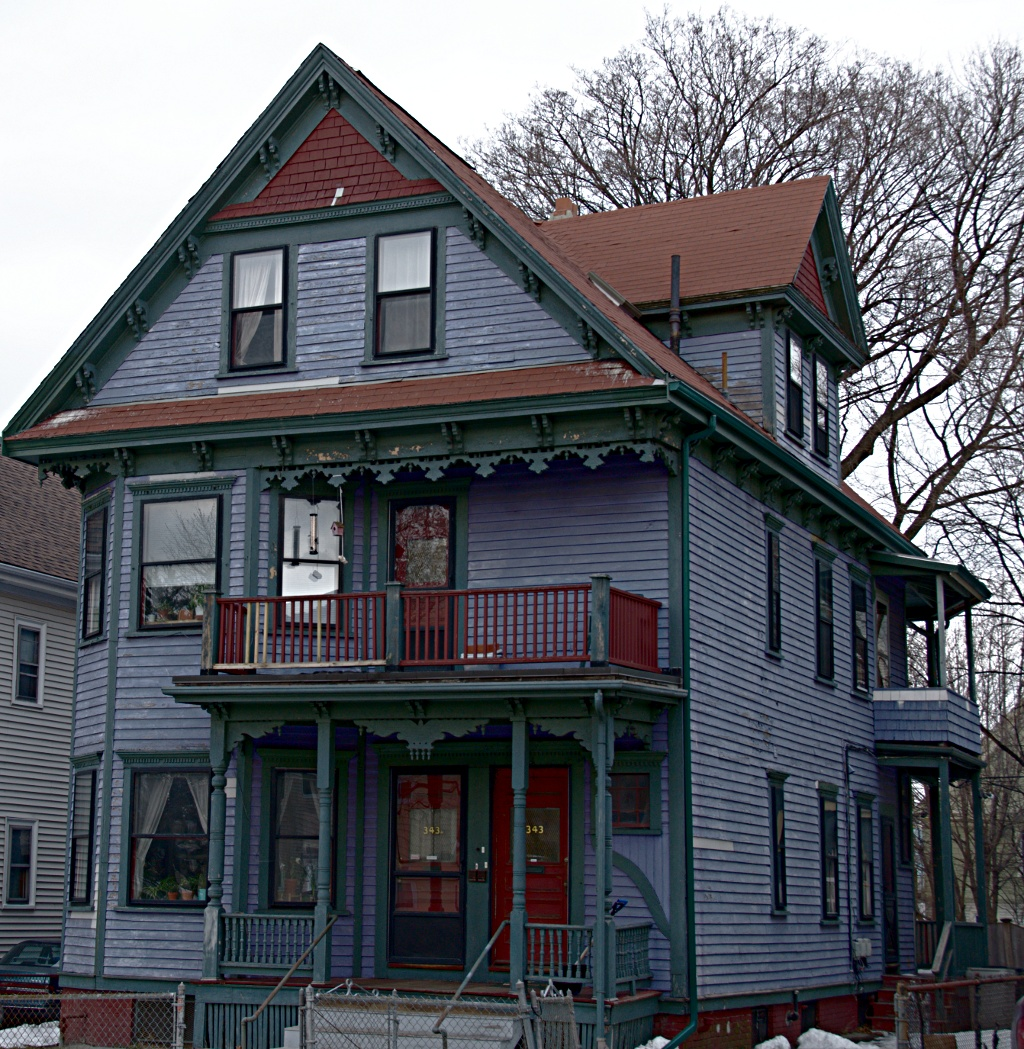

- Location within Massachusetts Location within the United States
- Location: 343 Highland Ave., Somerville, Massachusetts
- Coordinates: 42°23′38.7332″N 71°6′59.046″W
- Built: 1880
- Architectural style: Queen Anne
- MPS: Somerville MPS
- NRHP reference No.: 89001267
- Added to NRHP: September 18, 1989

The house at 343 Highland Avenue is a historic two-family house in Somerville, Massachusetts. The 2.5-story wood-frame Queen Anne style house was built c. 1880 as commuter housing. The house features jigsaw-cut bargeboard decoration on the porches, and paired brackets in the eaves and gables. It was built on land that had been part of a brickyard, which was subdivided for development in the 1870s.

The house was listed on the National Register of Historic Places in 1989.

== See also ==
- National Register of Historic Places listings in Somerville, Massachusetts
