= House at 25 Clyde Street =

Historic house in Massachusetts, United States

- U.S. National Register of Historic Places
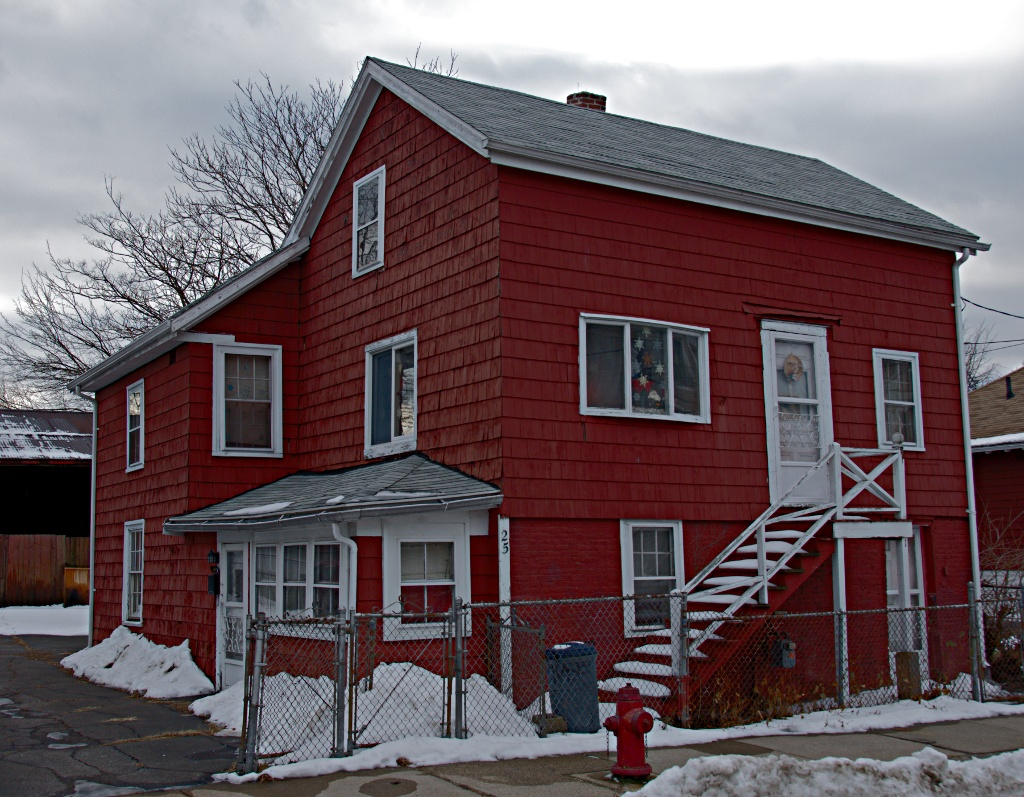
- Front from right, December 2012, before condo demolition and conversion.

- Location within Massachusetts Location within the United States
- Location: Somerville, Massachusetts
- Coordinates: 42°23′40.8893″N 71°6′33.0084″W
- Built: 1850
- MPS: Somerville MPS
- NRHP reference No.: 89001247
- Added to NRHP: September 18, 1989

The House at 25 Clyde Street in Somerville, Massachusetts is an example of a vernacular brickworker's house in the area. It is estimated to have been built about 1850, when the area was near one of the city's many brickyards. One characteristic common to these houses was the high brick basement wall, which is visible in this house.

The house was listed on the National Register of Historic Places in 1989.

By May 2014, the house was partially demolished, renovated and converted into a 3-unit condo. The entire shed in the back yard was demolished.

== Gallery ==
=== Before condo conversion, December 2012 ===
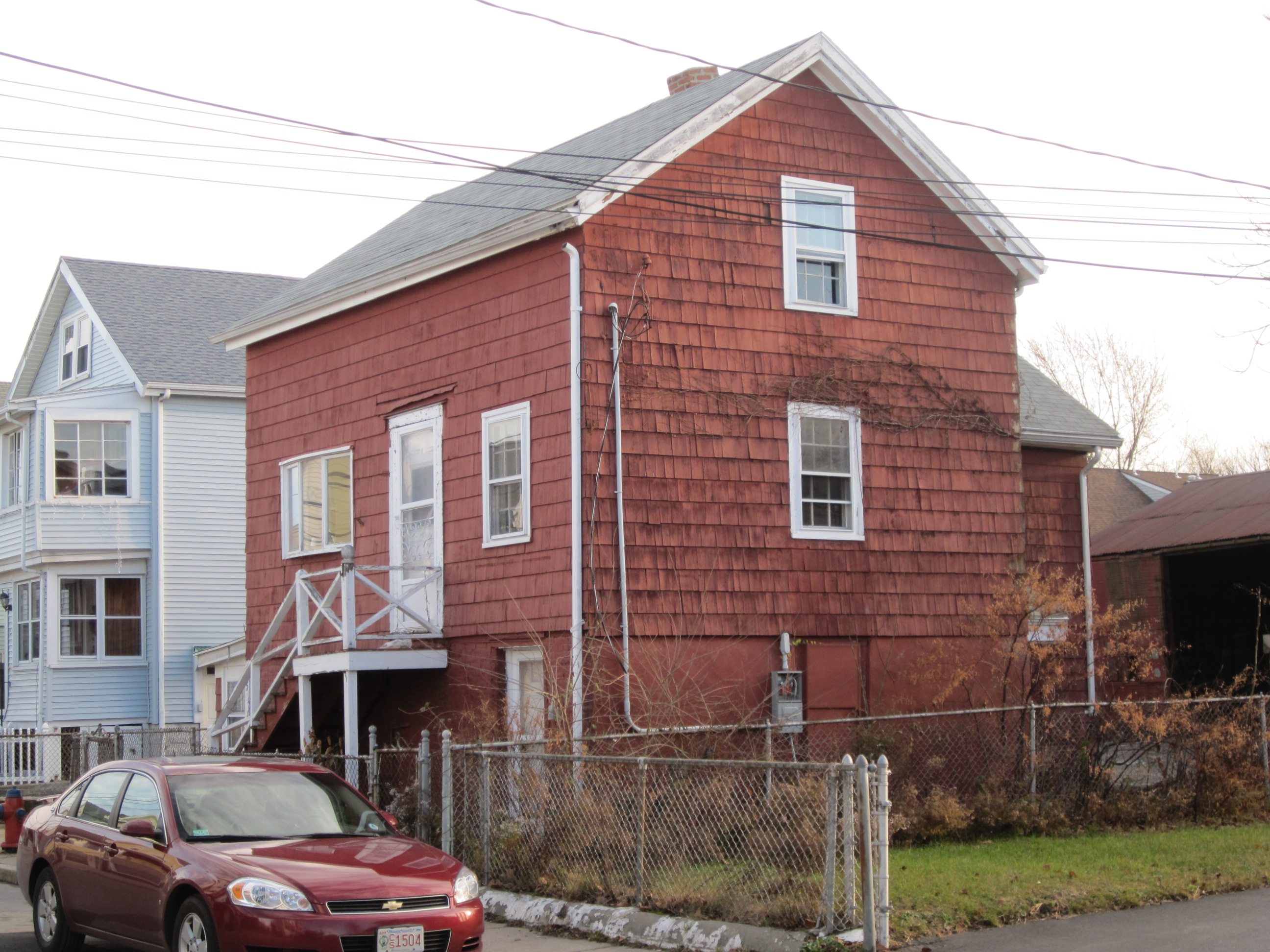
Right Side, December 2012

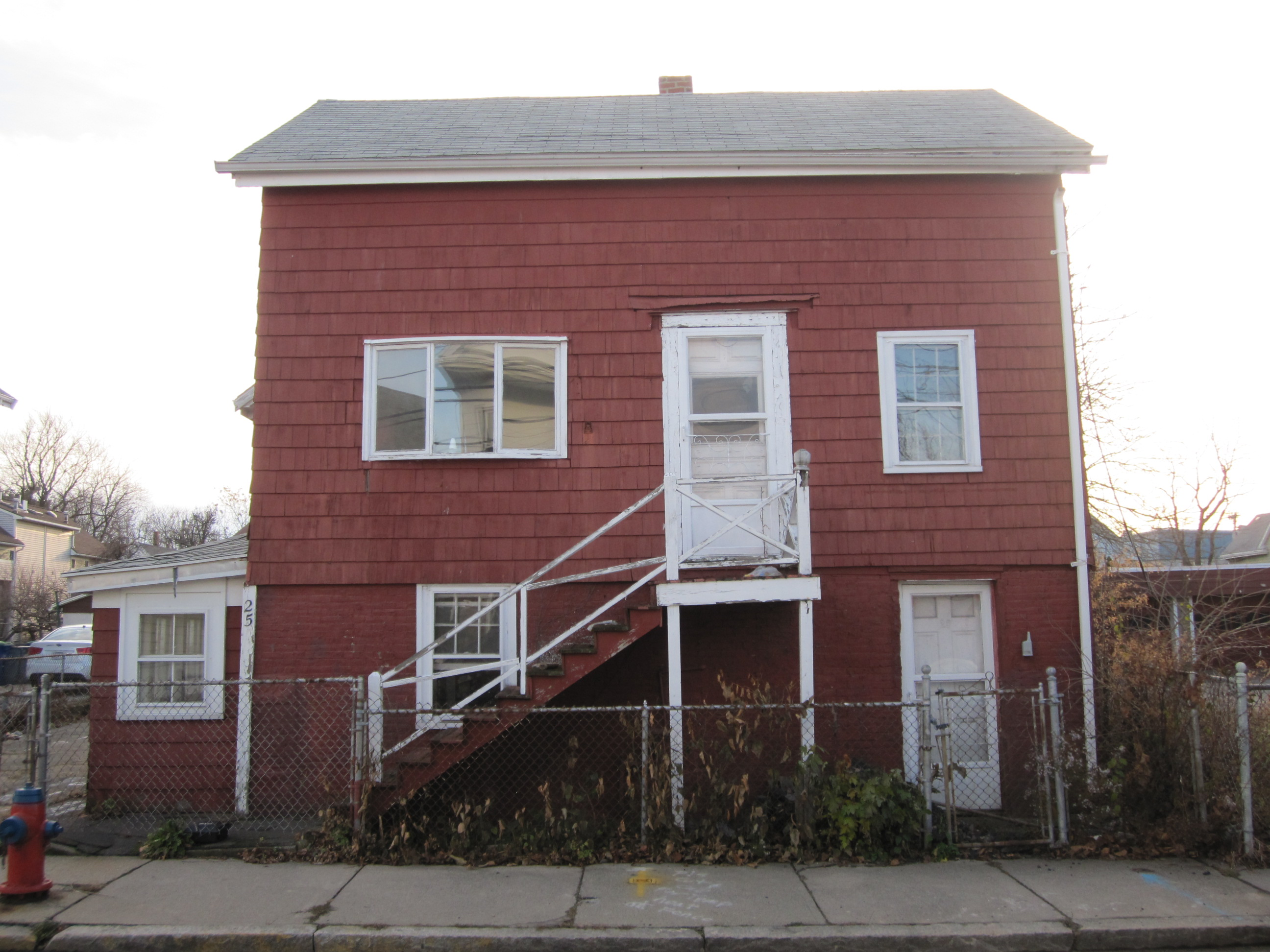
Front, December 2012

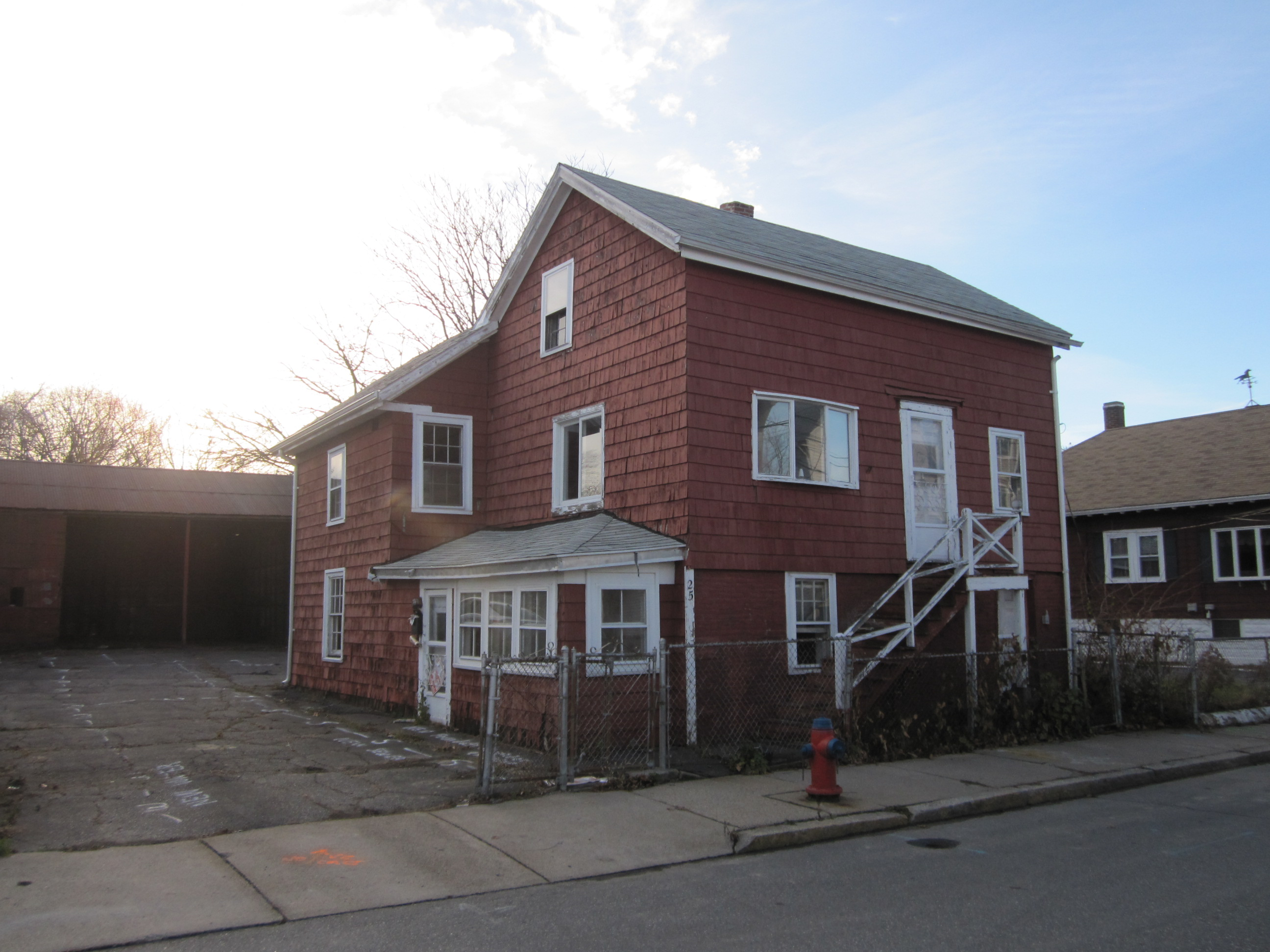
Left Side, December 2012

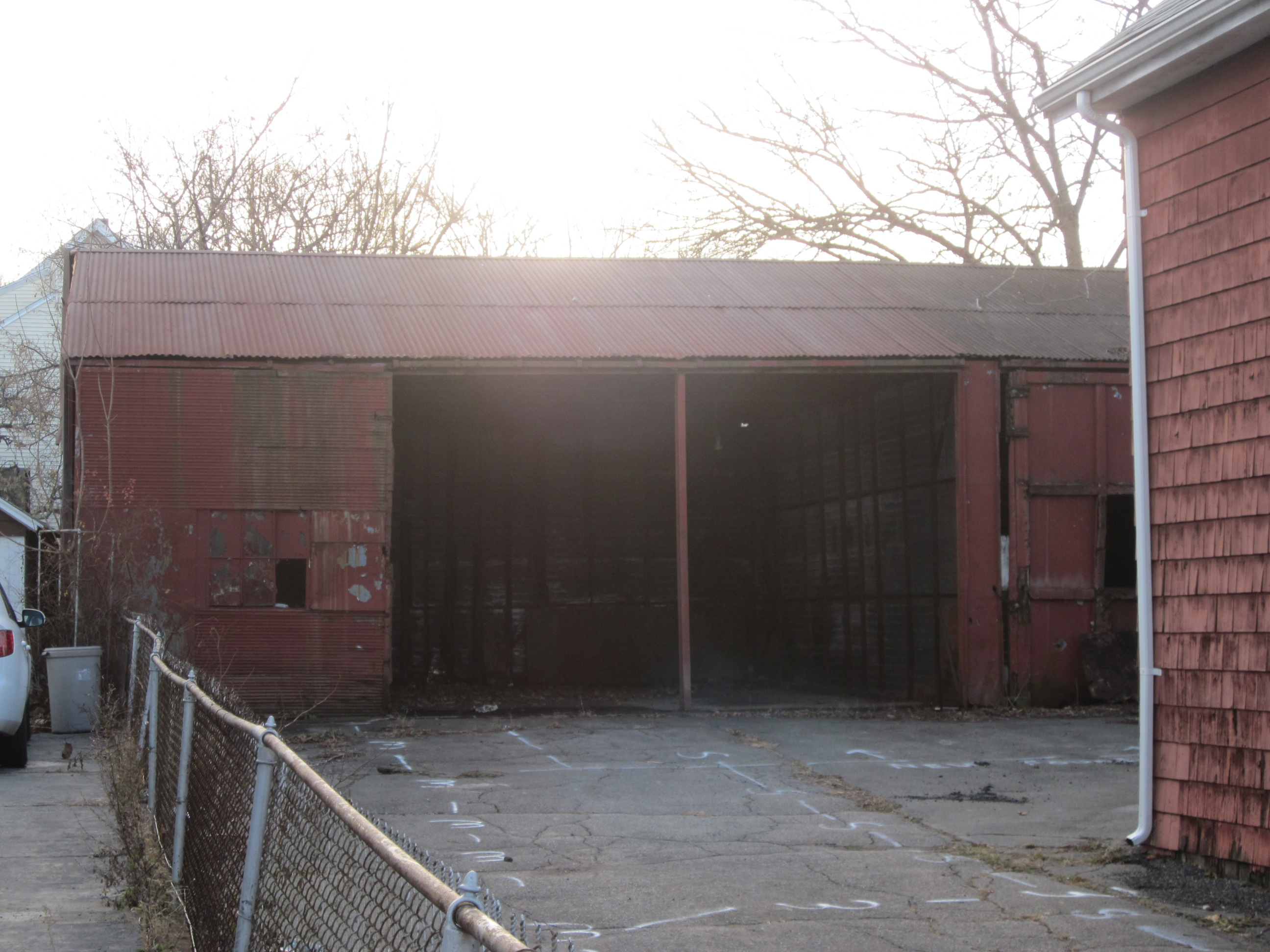
Shed, December 2012

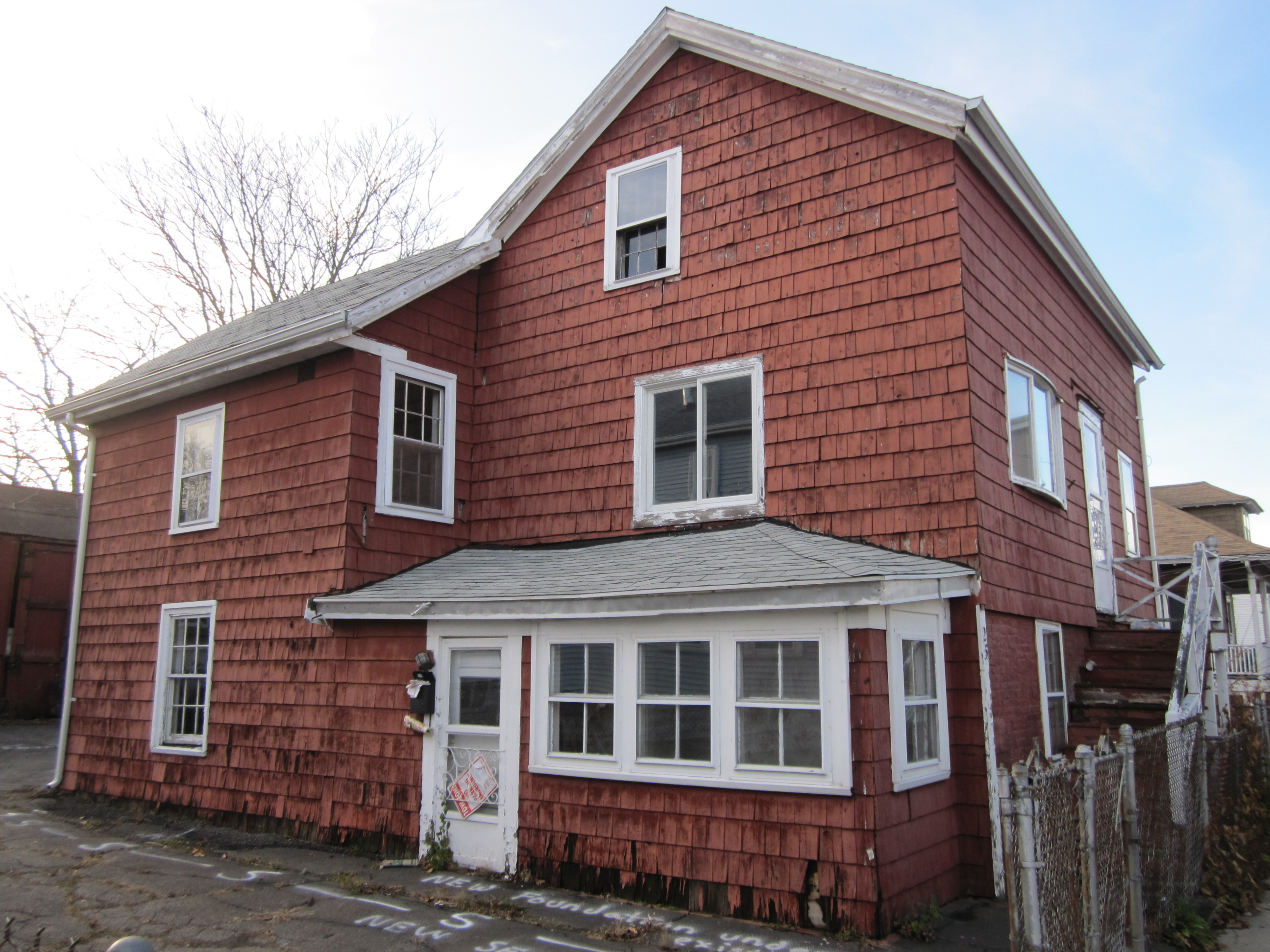
Left Side, December 2012

=== Condo conversion, May 2014 ===
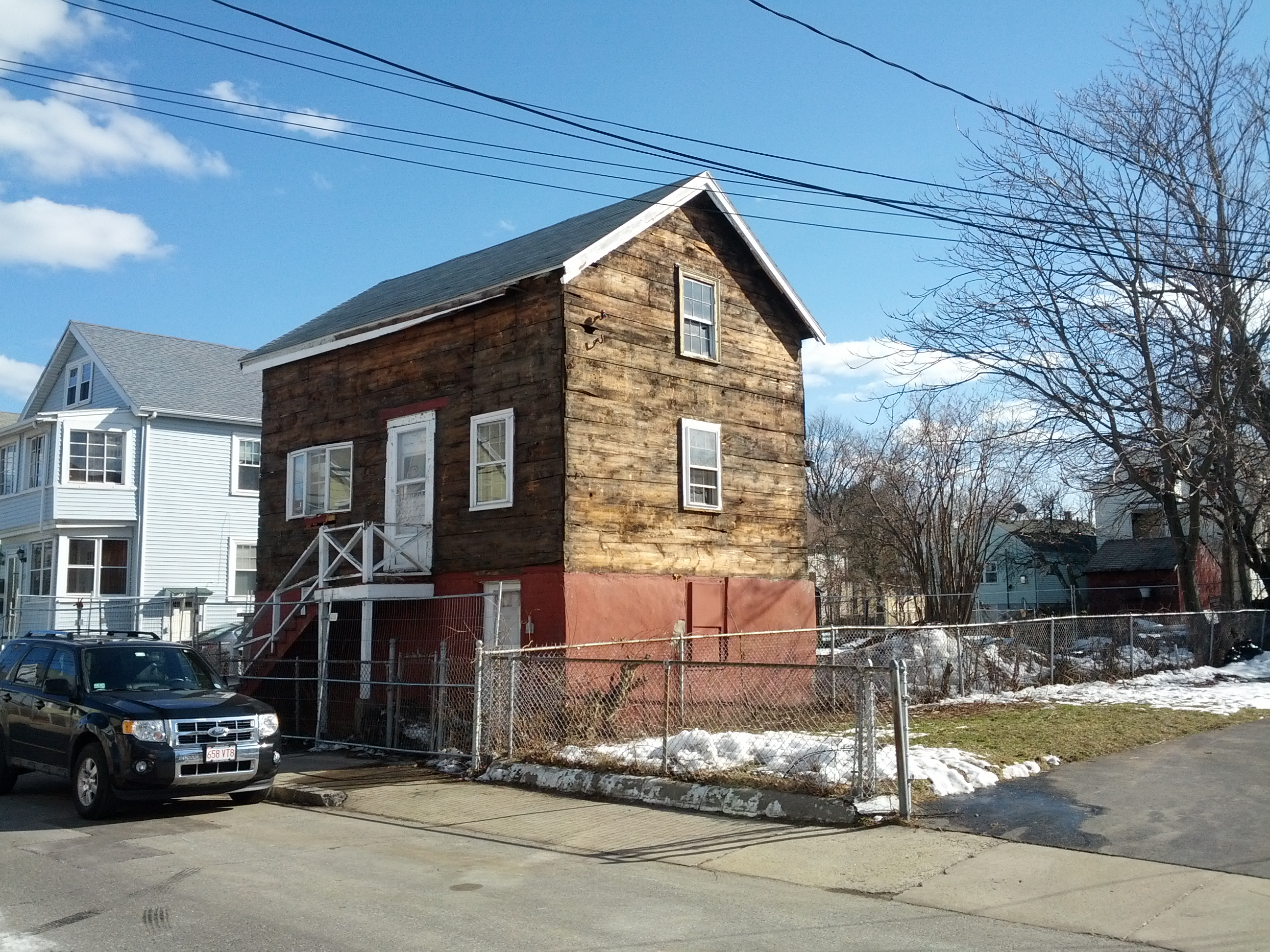
House at 25 Clyde St. in Somerville, MA. Photos from condo renovation.

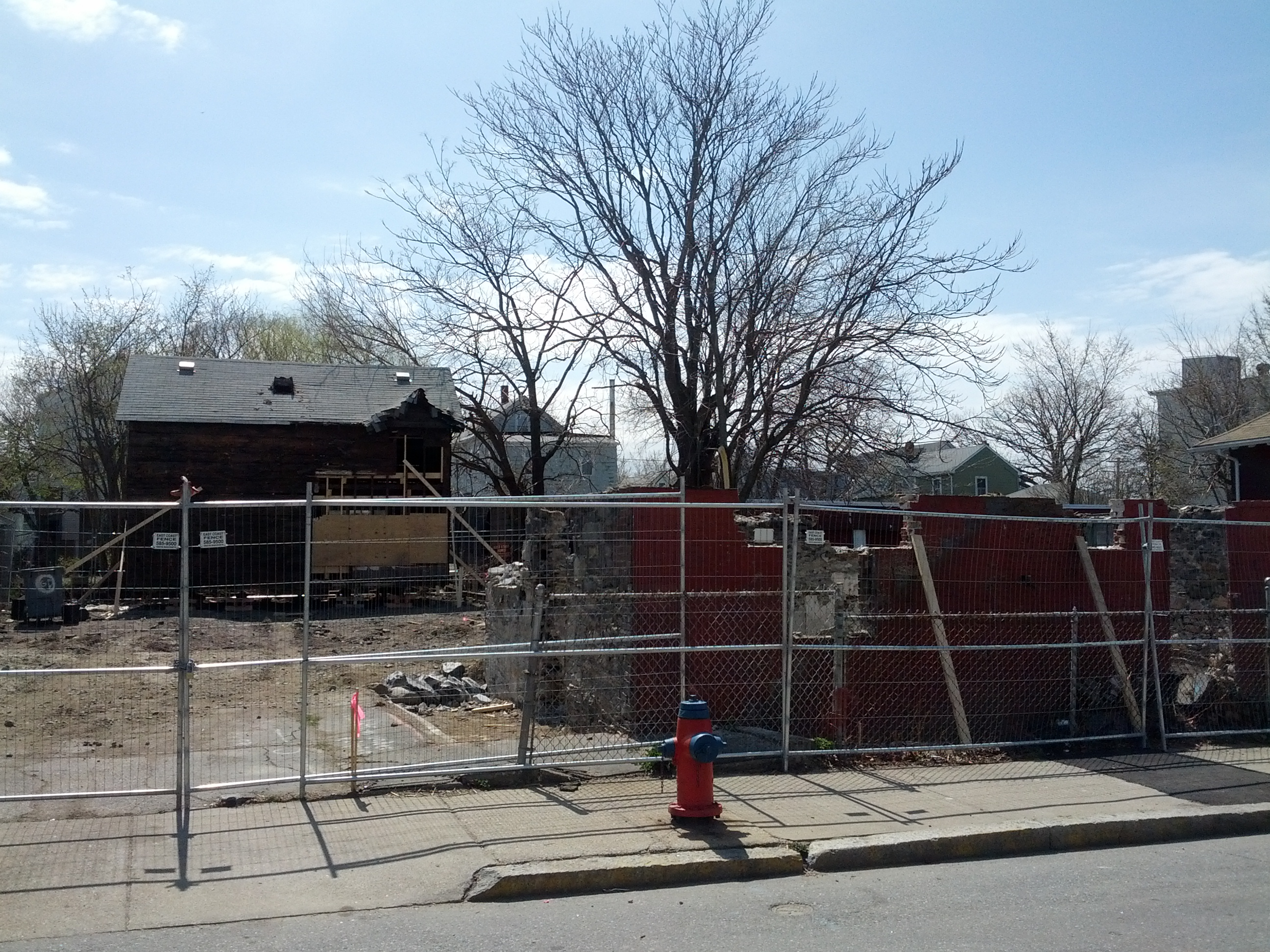
House at 25 Clyde St. in Somerville, MA. Photos from condo renovation.

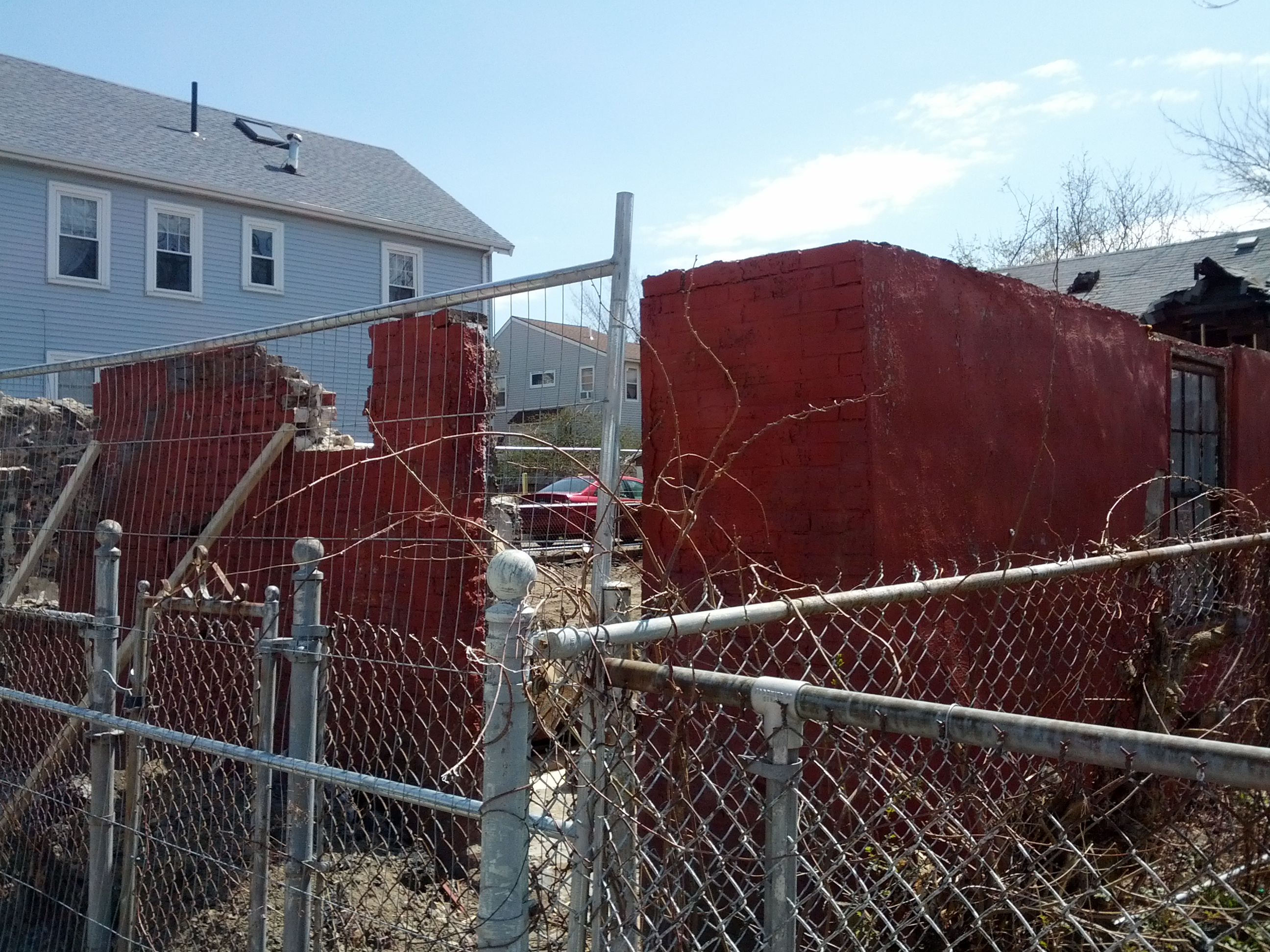
House at 25 Clyde St. in Somerville, MA. Photos from condo renovation.

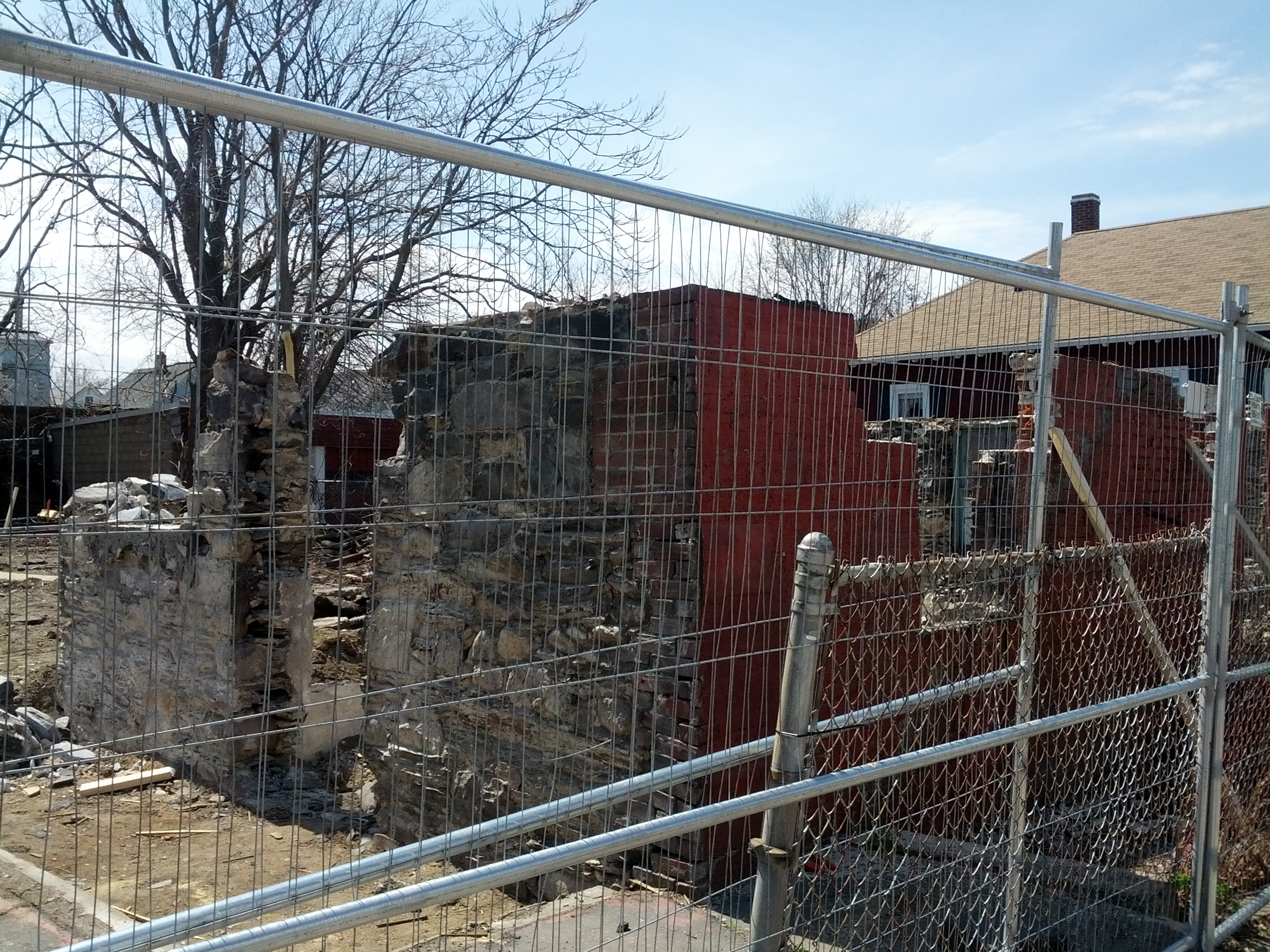
House at 25 Clyde St. in Somerville, MA. Photos from condo renovation.

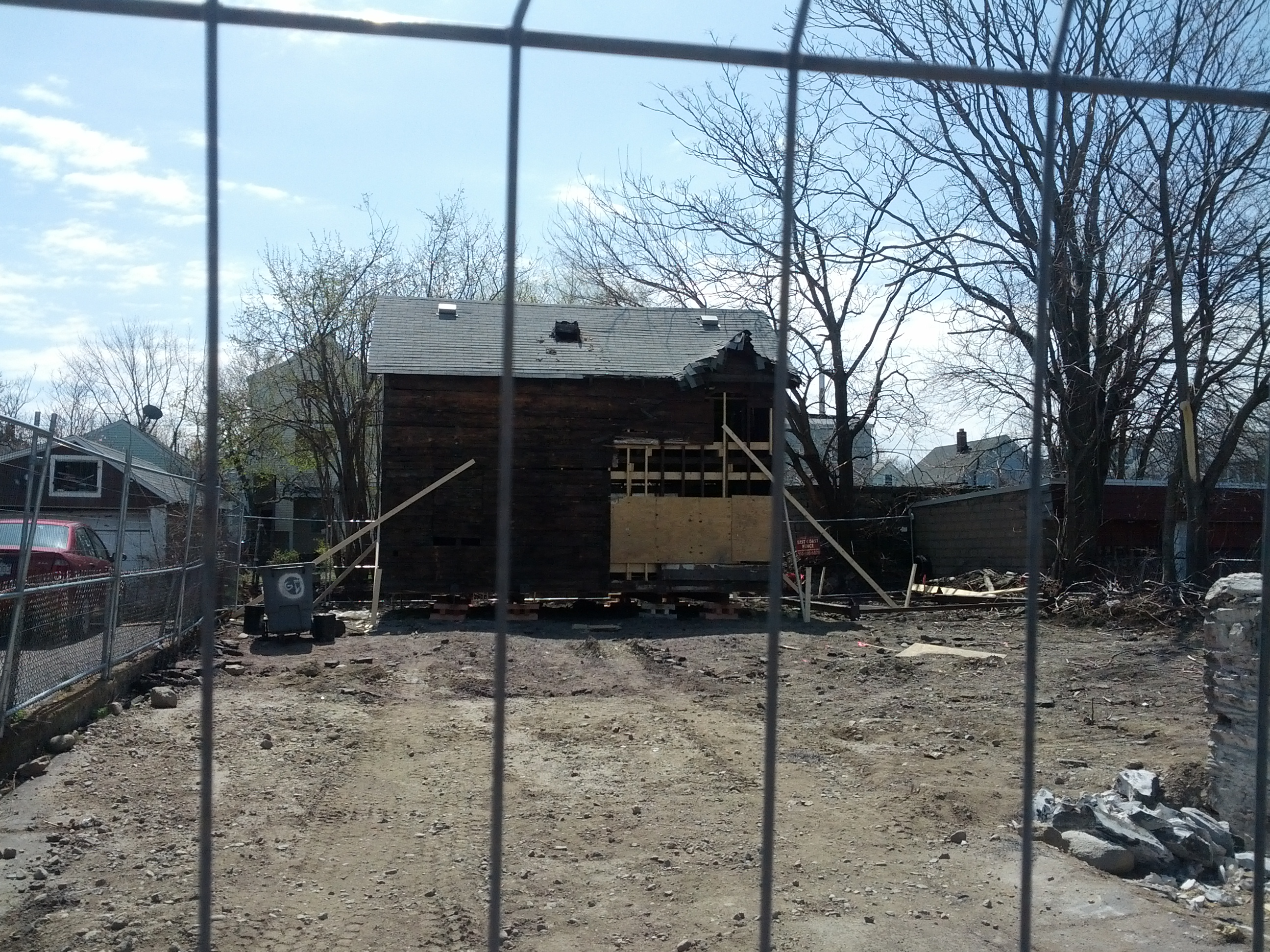
House at 25 Clyde St. in Somerville, MA. Photos from condo renovation.

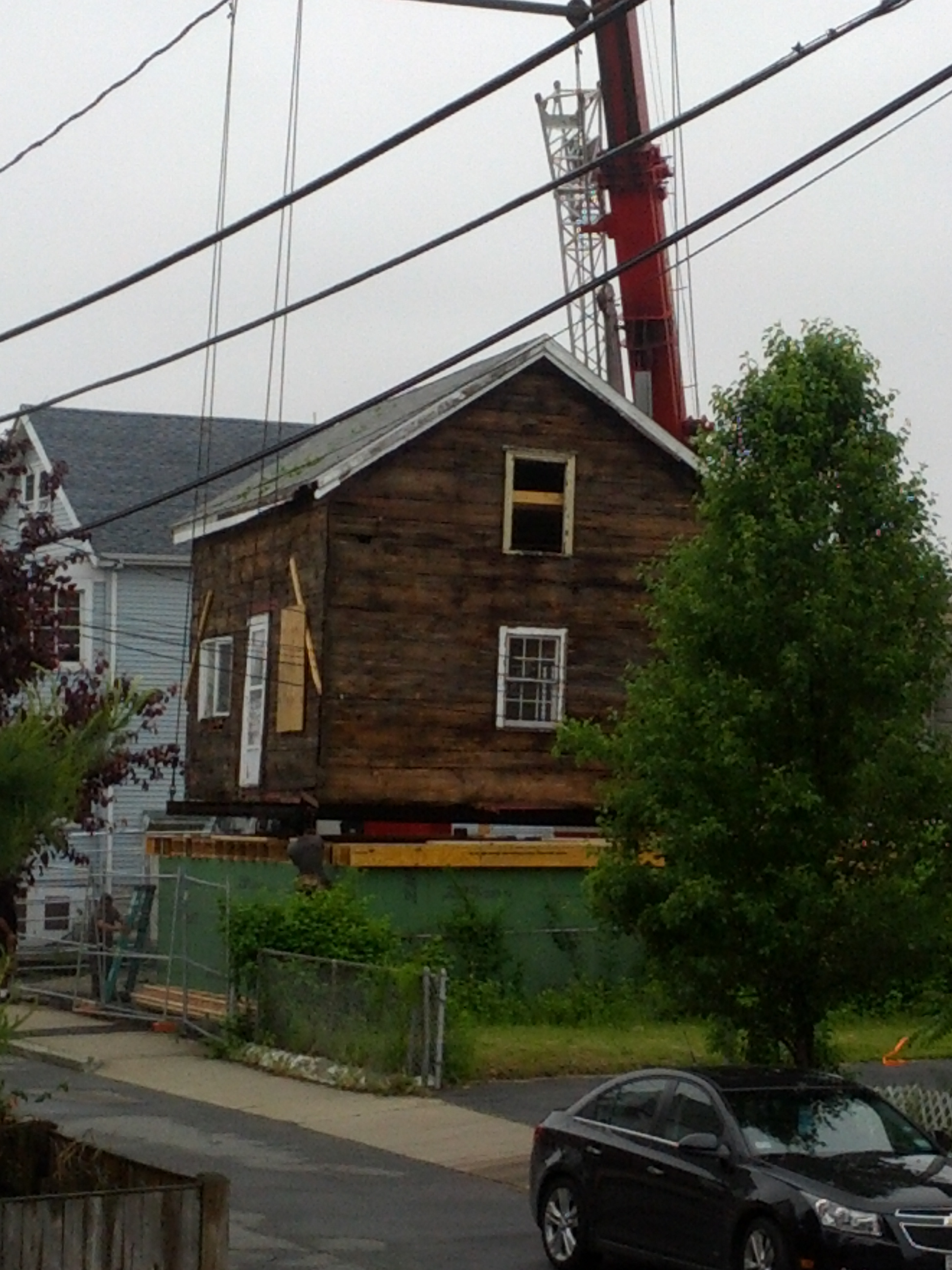
House at 25 Clyde St. in Somerville, MA. Photos from condo renovation.

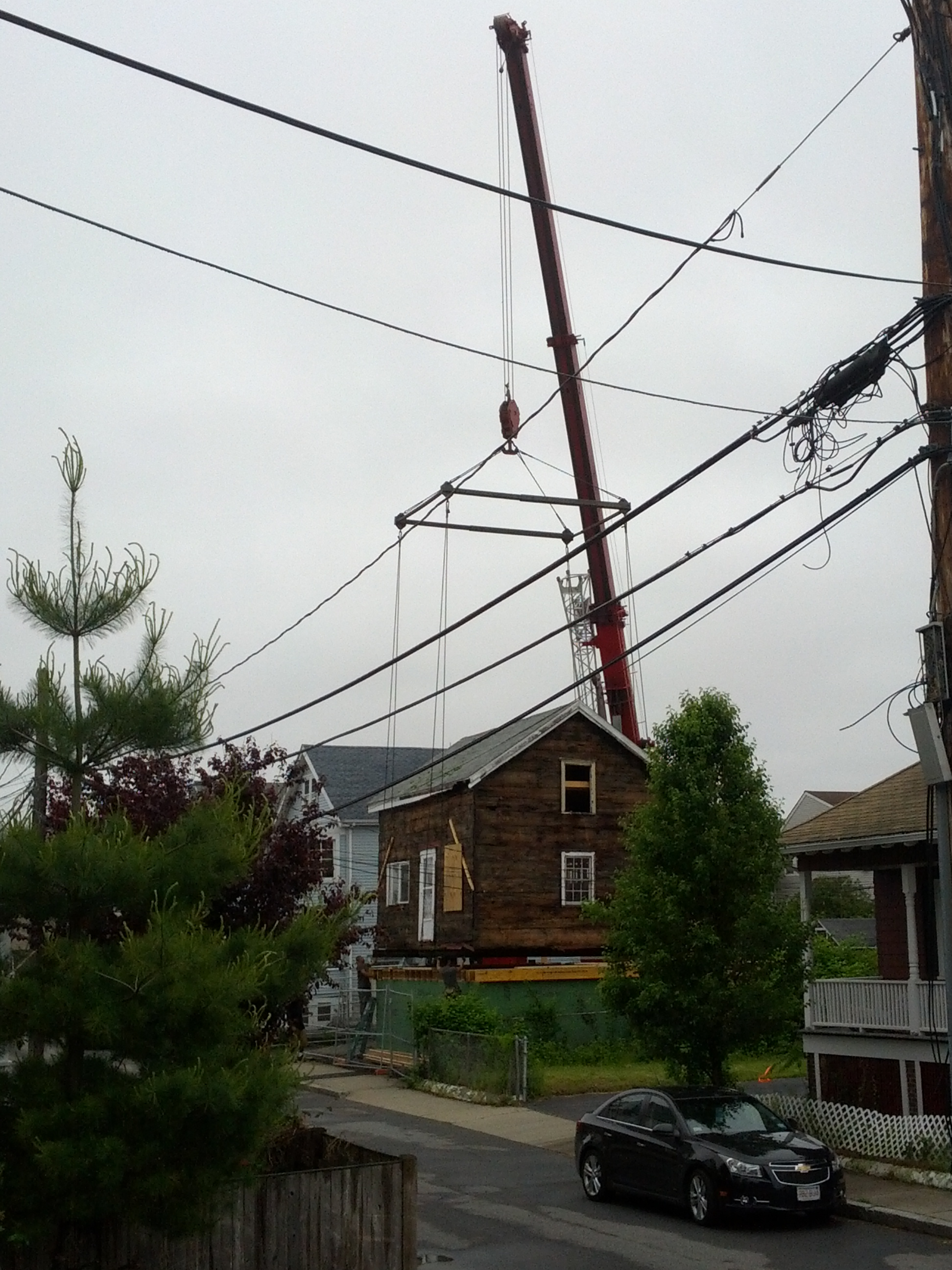
House at 25 Clyde St. in Somerville, MA. Photos from condo renovation.

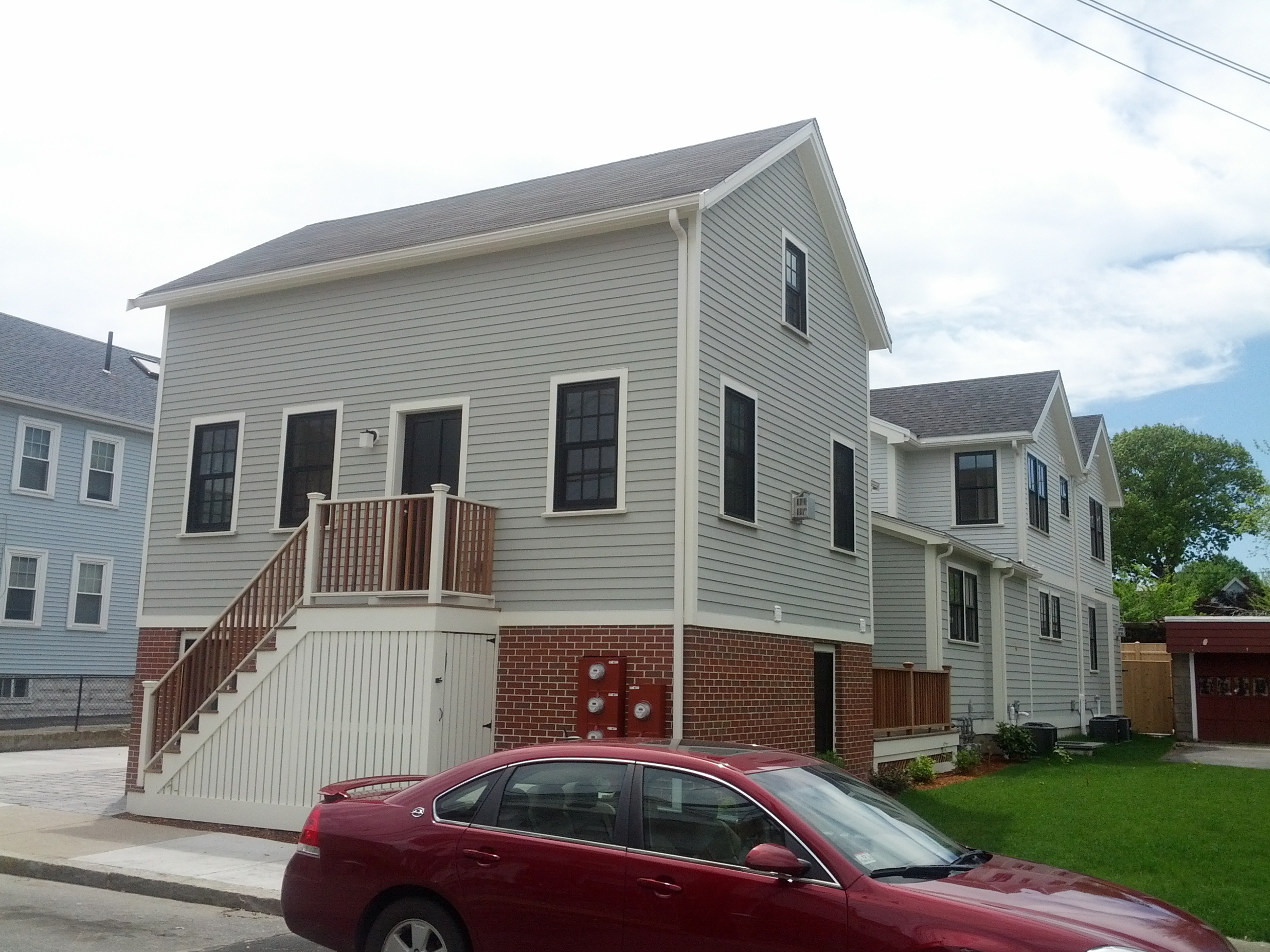
House at 25 Clyde St. in Somerville, MA. Photos from condo renovation.

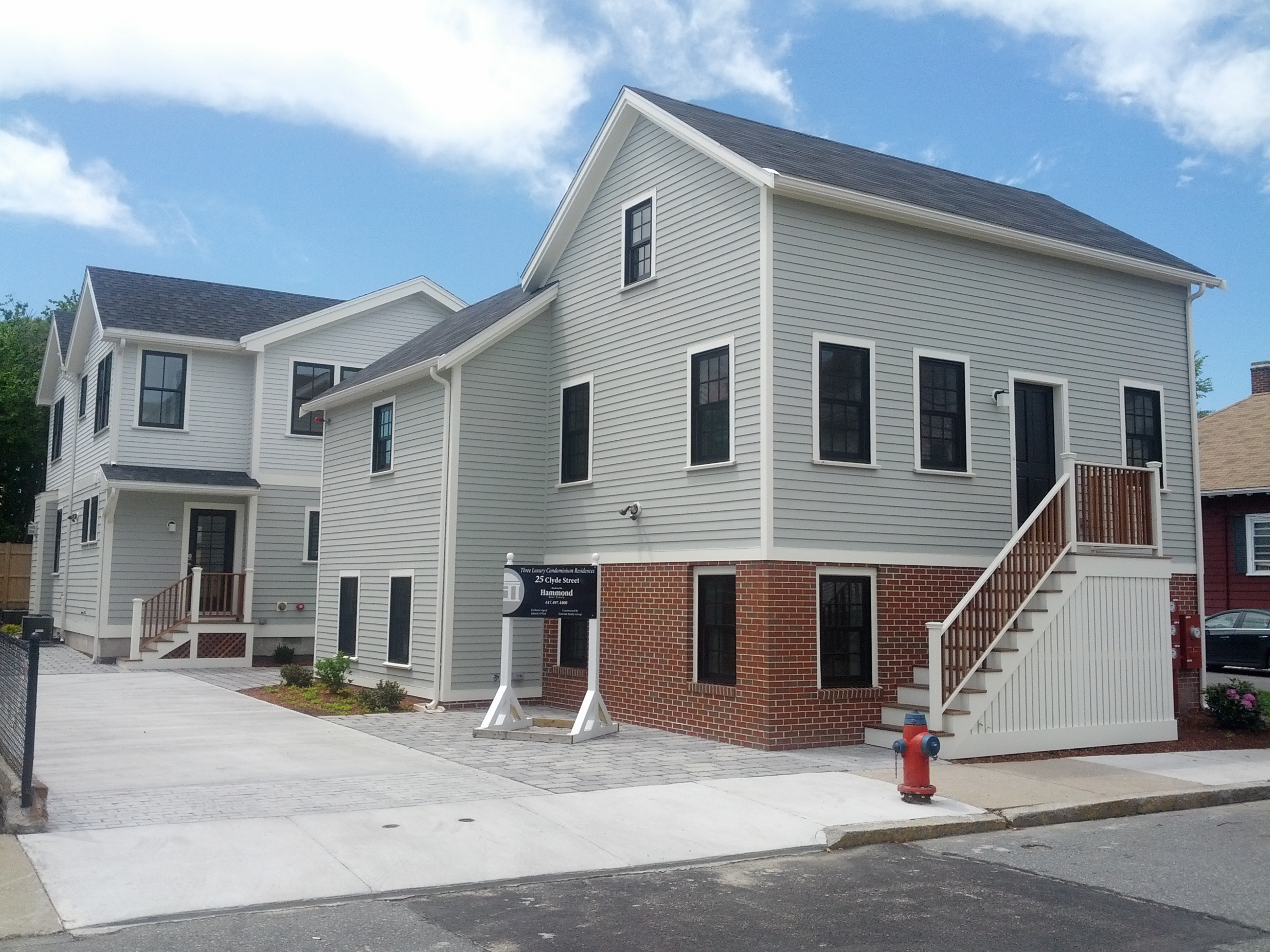
House at 25 Clyde St. in Somerville, MA. Photos from condo renovation.

== See also ==
- National Register of Historic Places listings in Somerville, Massachusetts
