= House at 197 Morrison Avenue =

Historic house in Massachusetts, United States

- U.S. National Register of Historic Places
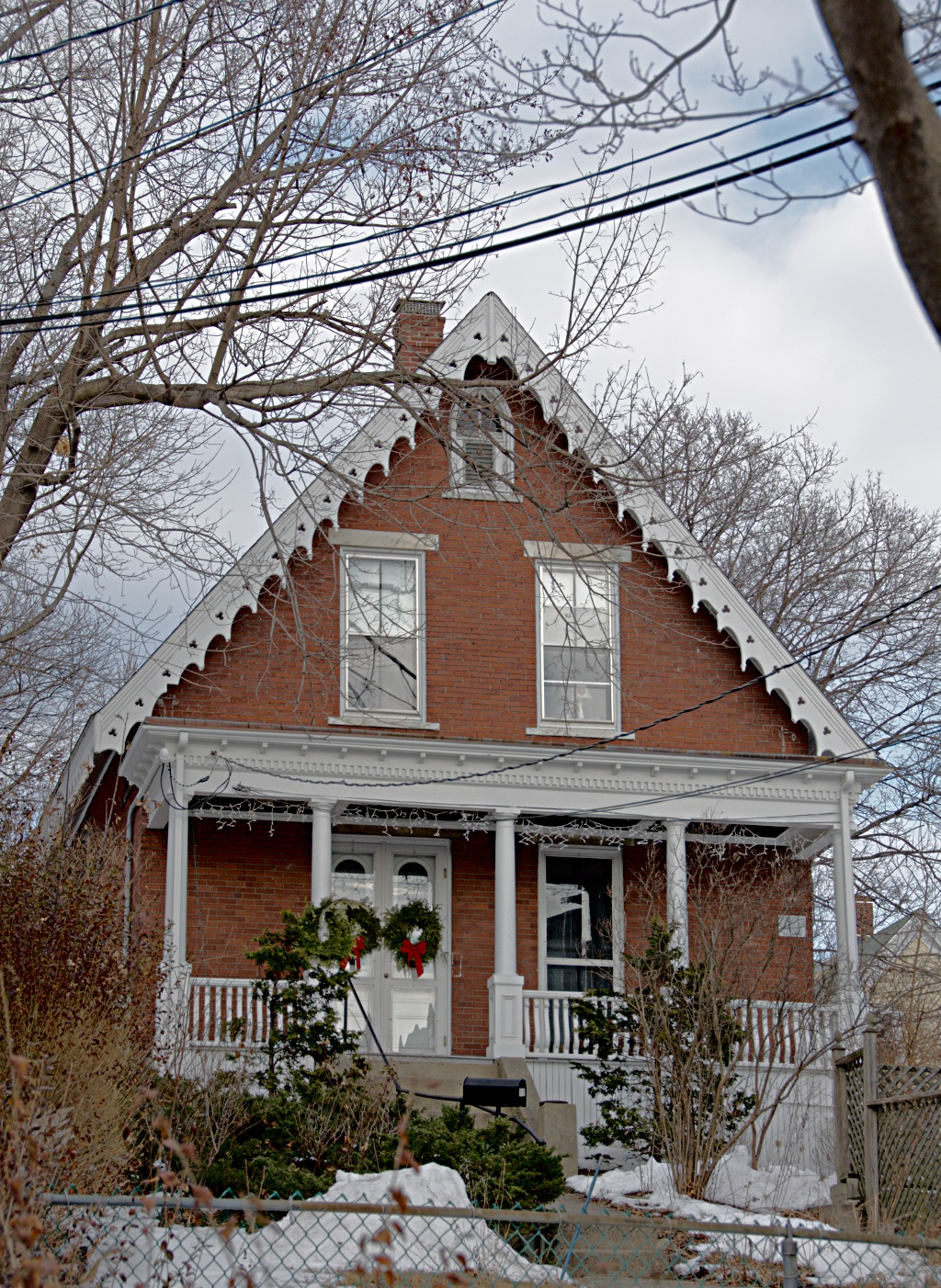

- Location within Massachusetts Location within the United States
- Location: 197 Morrison Ave., Somerville, Massachusetts
- Coordinates: 42°23′51.0654″N 71°7′9.56543″W
- Built: 1860
- Architectural style: Gothic Revival
- MPS: Somerville MPS
- NRHP reference No.: 89001273
- Added to NRHP: September 18, 1989

The house at 197 Morrison Avenue in Somerville, Massachusetts is the city's finest example of vernacular Gothic Revival architecture. The two-story brick building was built c. 1860, and is now set well back from the street behind a later house. Its notable features include bargeboard decoration in the front gable, which also has a Gothic lancet window, and its elaborate front porch decorations. The house is unusual for its position set well back from the street, since it predates the major development that took place on Morrison Avenue in the 1870s.

The house was listed on the National Register of Historic Places in 1989.

== See also ==
- National Register of Historic Places listings in Somerville, Massachusetts
