= House at 72R Dane Street =

Historic house in Massachusetts, United States

- U.S. National Register of Historic Places
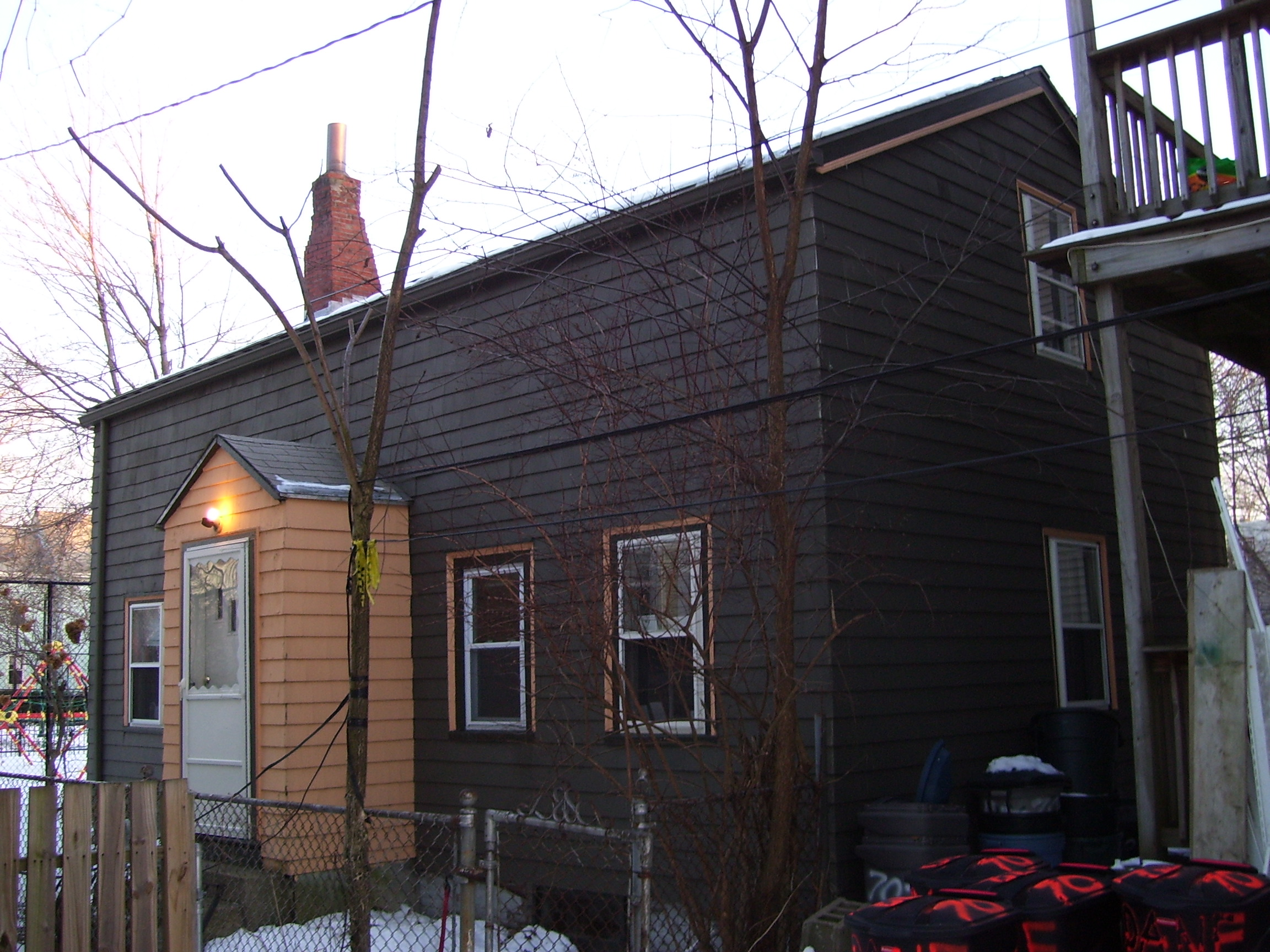

- Location within Massachusetts Location within the United States
- Location: 72R Dane St., Somerville, Massachusetts
- Coordinates: 42°22′45.8″N 71°6′13.8″W
- Architectural style: Colonial, Federal
- MPS: Somerville MPS
- NRHP reference No.: 89001254
- Added to NRHP: September 18, 1989

The house at 72R Dane Street in Somerville, Massachusetts is one of Somerville's oldest surviving structures and is located near the site of the earliest settlement in Somerville.

The house was built around 1790 and features American colonial and Federal style architecture. 72R Dane Street is located on a small right-of-way off of Dane Street. Dane Street "was laid out in 1845 to provide a north-south link between Somerville Avenue and Washington Street." The buildings surrounding 72R Dane Street were largely constructed as working class tenement housing in the mid-nineteenth century. 72R Dane Street was added to the National Register of Historic Places in 1989 and remains a private residence.

== See also ==
- National Register of Historic Places listings in Somerville, Massachusetts
