= Susan Russell House =

Historic house in Massachusetts, United States

- U.S. National Register of Historic Places
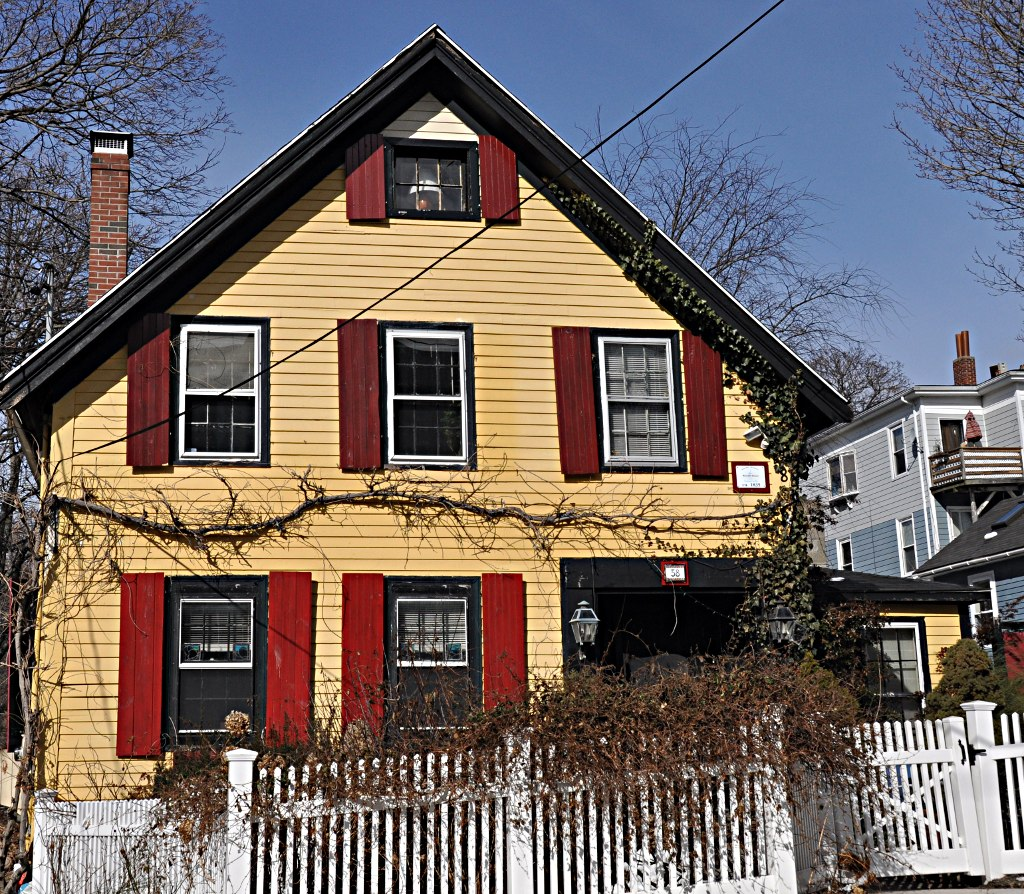

- Location within Massachusetts Location within the United States
- Location: 58 Sycamore Street, Somerville, Massachusetts
- Coordinates: 42°23′24.15″N 71°6′2.11″W
- Built: 1830
- Architectural style: Greek Revival
- MPS: Somerville MPS
- NRHP reference No.: 89001286
- Added to NRHP: September 18, 1989

The Susan Russell House is a historic house in Somerville, Massachusetts. The 1.5-story Greek Revival cottage is estimated to have been built in the 1830s, based on a stylistic analysis. It is a rare survivor of a style that was once common in Somerville. Greek Revival element is its door surround. The house was added to the National Register of Historic Places in 1989.

The land on which the Susan Russell House sits was purchased from Oliver Tufts in the early 19th century.

== See also ==
- National Register of Historic Places listings in Somerville, Massachusetts
