= House at 35 Temple Street =

Historic house in Massachusetts, United States

- U.S. National Register of Historic Places
- Location within Massachusetts Location within the United States
- Location: 35 Temple St., Somerville, Massachusetts
- Coordinates: 42°23′37″N 71°5′34″W
- Architectural style: Georgian
- MPS: Somerville MPS
- NRHP reference No.: 89001288
- Added to NRHP: September 18, 1989

The House at 35 Temple Street in Somerville, Massachusetts was one of the few 18th-century houses in the city. The 2.5-story wood-frame house was probably built between 1750 and 1780, and had retained most of its Georgian features, including a steeply pitched gambrel roof. The house was probably moved to this location from Broadway or Mystic Avenue in the 19th century.

The house was added to the National Register of Historic Places in 1989. The house was destroyed by fire in 2002. It was then replaced on the site by a modern duplex (see photo).

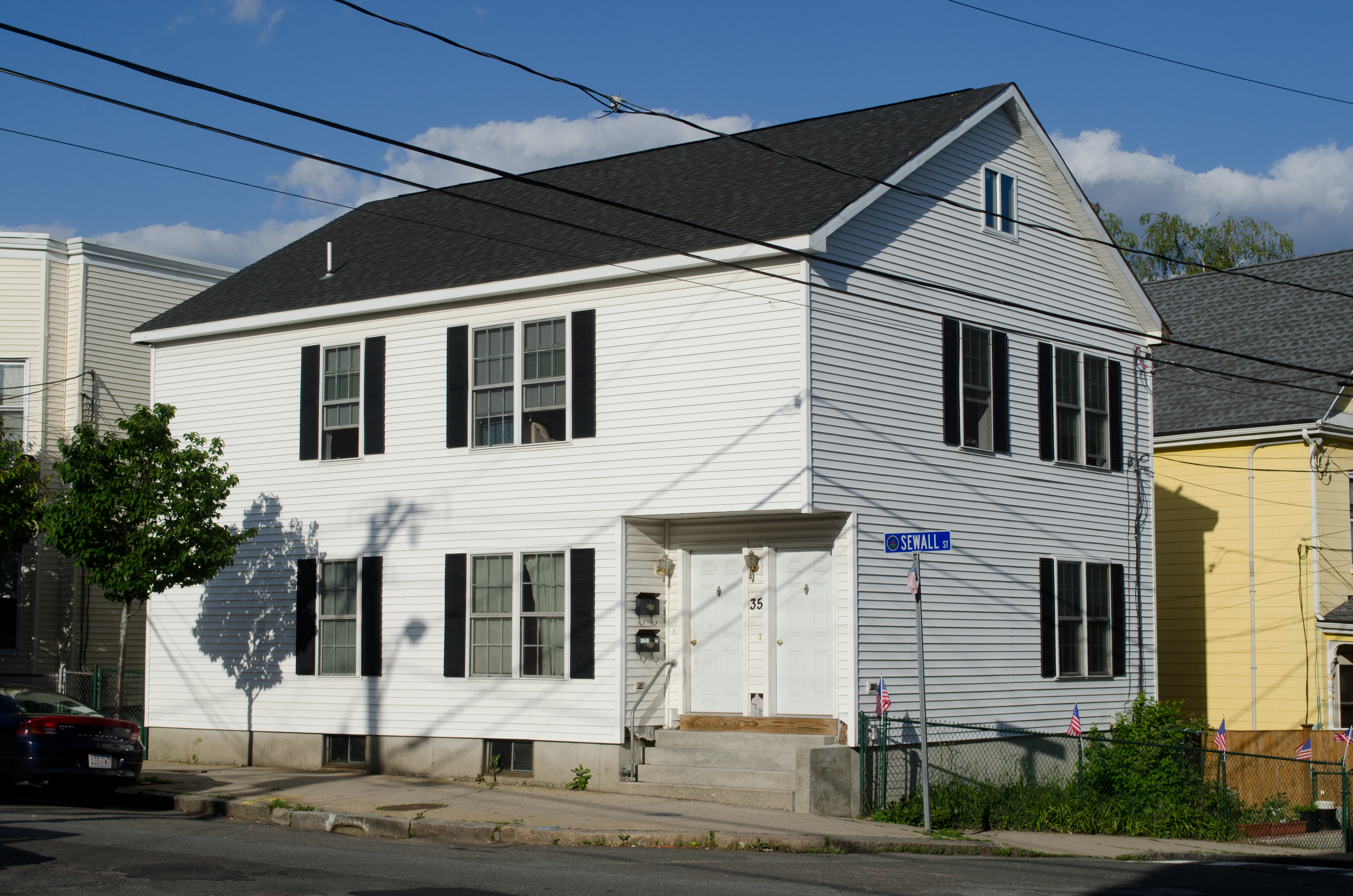
Modern duplex at 35 Temple Street

== See also ==
- National Register of Historic Places listings in Somerville, Massachusetts
