= Bow Street Historic District =

Historic district in Massachusetts, United States

- U.S. National Register of Historic Places
- U.S. Historic district
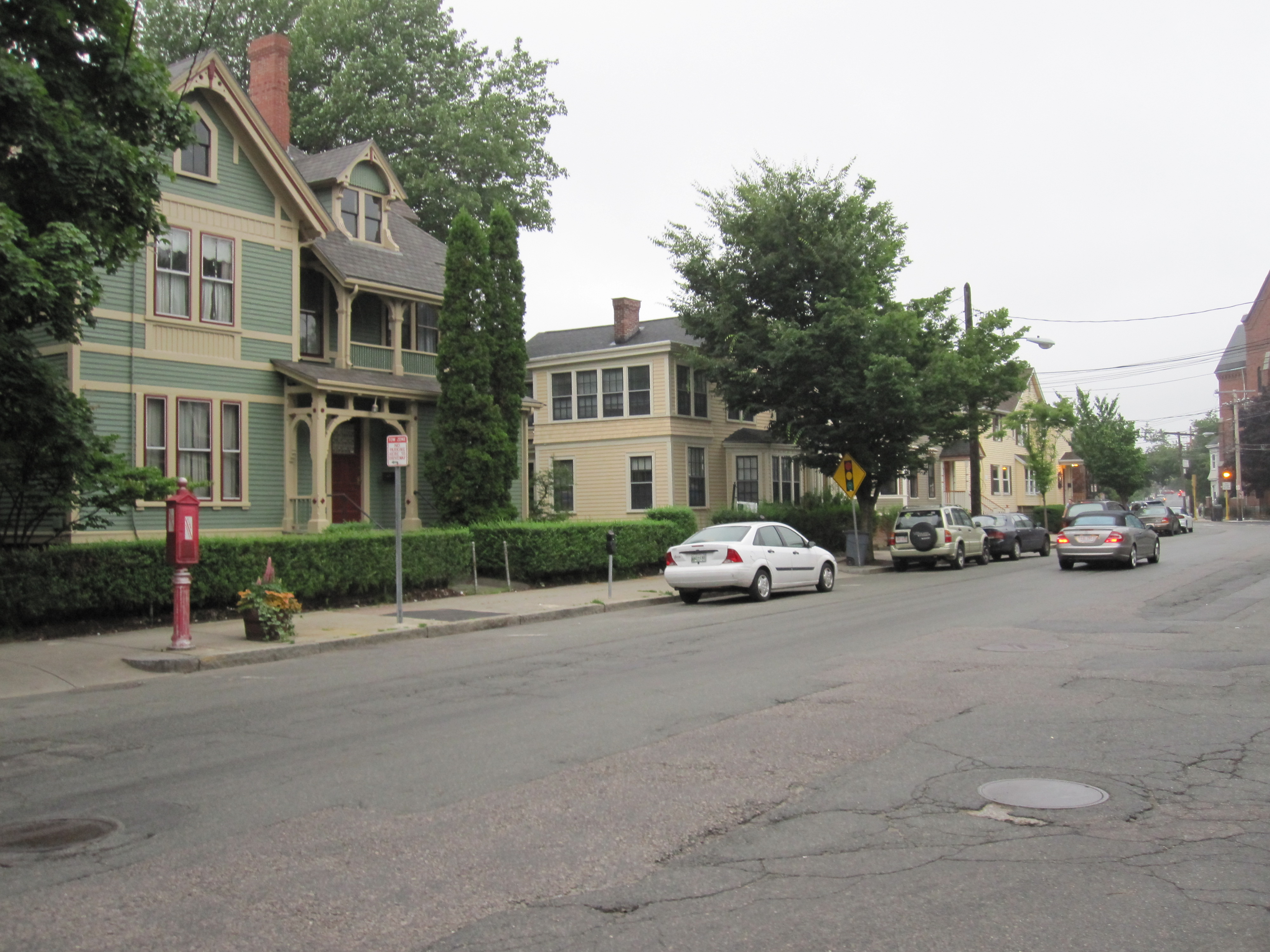

- Location within Massachusetts Location within the United States
- Location: Bow St., Somerville, Massachusetts
- Coordinates: 42°22′53″N 71°5′54″W
- Area: 3 acres (1.2 ha)
- Architect: Multiple
- Architectural style: Late Victorian
- NRHP reference No.: 76000274
- Added to NRHP: March 26, 1976

The Bow Street Historic District encompasses a mixed 19th-century commercial-residential in the Union Square area of Somerville, Massachusetts. It covers a part of the west side of Union Square that saw significant development during the city's growth in the 19th century, and has remained well-preserved since then. The district was added to the National Register of Historic Places in 1976.

== Description and history ==
The city of Somerville was first settled in 1630 and was part of Charlestown until 1842. From an early date, a track developed that skirted Prospect Hill to the north and a marshy area to the south, between the center of Charlestown and Menotomy, as what is now Arlington was then called. This route now consists of Washington Street, Bow Street, and Somerville Avenue. The Bow Street section, a bend in the road around a marshy area, was eventually bypassed when the marsh was filled in, but was before then a point of development along the road. It remained a significant area of development in the 19th century, as the Union Square area developed as the town's (and later city's) principal area of industry and commerce in the 19th century. The principal intersection of Union Square has been intensively redeveloped, but a portion of Bow Street has managed to retain its 19th-century character.

The historic district covers most of Bow Street, omitting only a few buildings at its eastern end. It includes, among other buildings, a former police station, built c. 1875 in the Gothic Victorian style, the 1887 Romanesque Revival Prospect Hill Congregational Church, and two buildings (the Drouet Block and the Richmond, both from 1898) designed by architect Aaron H. Gould that served as both commercial space and apartment-style hotels.

== See also ==
- National Register of Historic Places listings in Somerville, Massachusetts
