= The Grandview =

- U.S. National Register of Historic Places
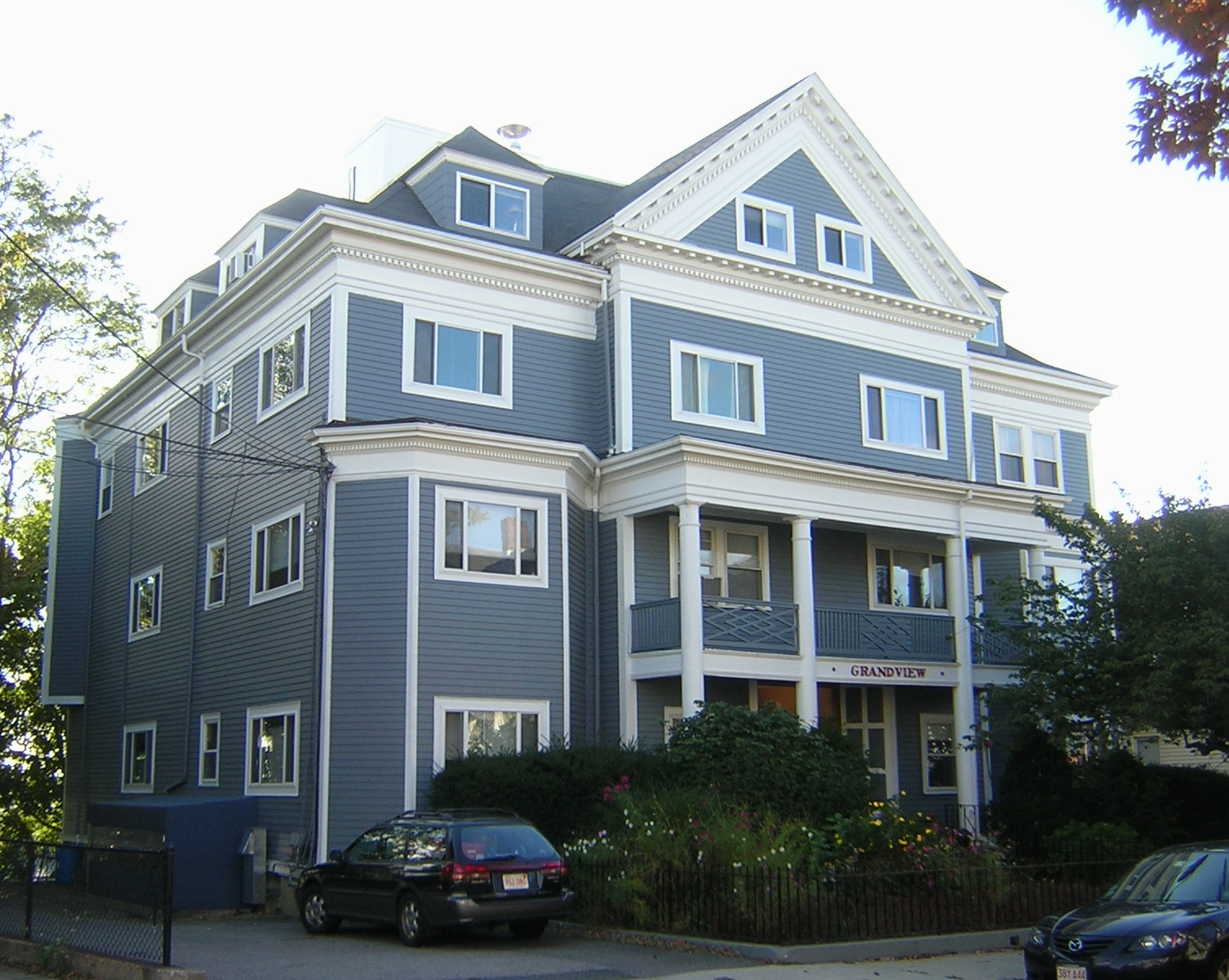

- Location within Massachusetts Location within the United States
- Location: 82 Munroe St., Somerville, Massachusetts
- Coordinates: 42°22′56.5″N 71°5′41″W
- Area: less than one acre
- Built: 1896
- Architect: Leighton, Mark
- Architectural style: Colonial Revival
- MPS: Somerville MPS
- NRHP reference No.: 89001275
- Added to NRHP: September 18, 1989

The Grandview is a historic apartment hotel at 82 Munroe Street in Somerville, Massachusetts. This type of building was not uncommon in the city at the time of its 1896 construction. This building affords commanding views of the Boston area from its site near the top of Prospect Hill, and has well-preserved Colonial Revival styling. The building was listed on the National Register of Historic Places in 1989.

== Description and history ==
The Grandview is located near the summit of Prospect Hill, a hill overlooking the city of Boston that was of military importance during the American Revolutionary War. It stands immediately west of Prospect Hill Park, on the south side of Munroe Street. It is a 3 1/2-story wood-frame structure, with a truncated hip roof and clapboard siding. A central full-height gable-roofed pavilion projects from the center of the north-facing facade, with a two-story porch projecting further. The fully pedimented gable is decorated with modillions and dentil moulding, the latter of which is also found at the roof line. The porch is flanked by two-story projecting bays, and there are gable-roof dormers projecting from the roof on several sides. The rear of the building has full-width porches on all three levels. Most of the building's windows have been modernized, with three-pane sliding windows typical.

The Grandview was built in 1896 by Elbridge Park, a city alderman, and was one of 45 "apartment hotels" listed in the city directory in 1900. These types of transient apartment houses were built in the city near ready access to public transportation, and catered to commuters working in Boston. This particularly fine example has retained much of its Colonial Revival ornamentation.

== See also ==
- National Register of Historic Places listings in Somerville, Massachusetts
