= Robert Munroe House =

Historic house in Massachusetts, United States

- U.S. National Register of Historic Places
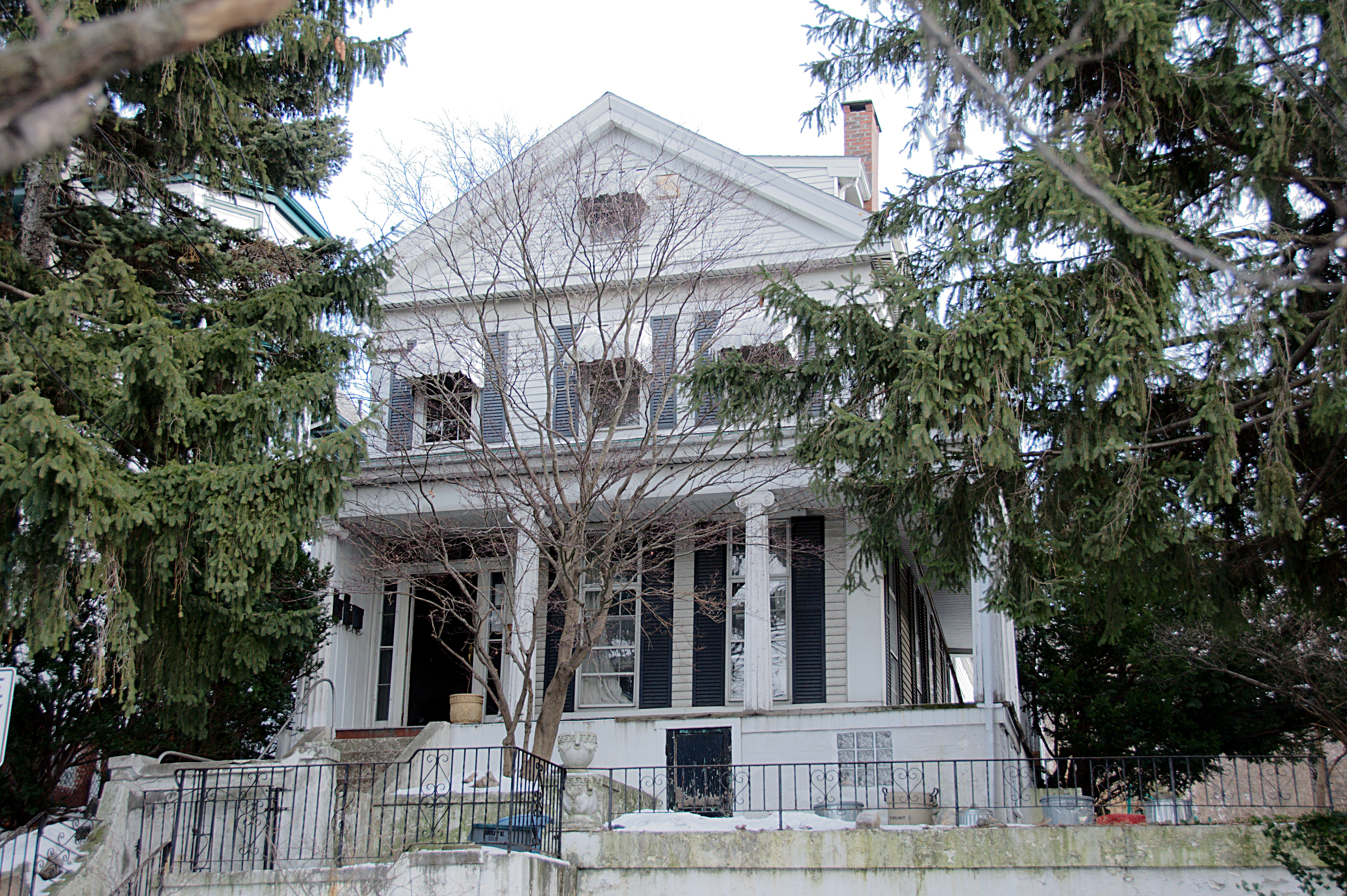

- Location within Massachusetts Location within the United States
- Location: 37 Walnut Street, Somerville, Massachusetts
- Coordinates: 42°22′57.86″N 71°5′44.05″W
- Built: 1849
- Architectural style: Greek Revival
- MPS: Somerville MPS
- NRHP reference No.: 89001294
- Added to NRHP: September 18, 1989

The Robert Munroe House is a historic house in Somerville, Massachusetts. The modest side-hall Greek Revival house was built c. 1849 for Robert Munroe, a Boston grain dealer who was an early resident of Prospect Hill (Munroe Street is named for him). The house has a full-width front porch with Ionic columns that wraps around to the right side of the house. The front entry is surrounded by sidelight and transom windows, and flanked by pilasters.

The house was listed on the National Register of Historic Places in 1989.

== See also ==
- National Register of Historic Places listings in Somerville, Massachusetts
