= Timeline of the flag of the United States =

The following is a timeline of the flag of the United States.

- 1776 January 1 – The Continental Colours, first flown at the commissioning of Continental Admiral Esek Hopkins' flagship on December 3, 1775, is displayed at George Washington's Prospect Hill camp, north of Cambridge and Boston, during the Siege of Boston. The flag has 13 horizontal stripes, alternating red and white in the field, representing the United Colonies of America, and a British Union flag in the canton.
- 1776 May – A popular legend promulgated by the descendants of Betsy Ross of Philadelphia during the 1870s holds that the seamstress sewed the first American flag. The claim is widely discredited by researchers and historians.
- 1777 June 14 – Continental Congress adopts the following: "Resolved, That the flag of the thirteen United States be thirteen stripes, alternate red and white; that the union be thirteen stars, white in a blue field, representing a new constellation."
- 1787 – Captain Robert Gray carries the flag around the world on his sailing vessel (around the tip of South America, to China, and beyond).
- 1795 – Flag with 15 stars and 15 stripes designed - often with unique red stripe under the blue field/canton (added Vermont and Kentucky to the original Thirteen Colonies stars)
- 1814 September 14 – Francis Scott Key writes the four stanza poem "The Defence of Fort McHenry". Set by his brother-in-law to the music of The Anacreontic Song, and eventually re-named "The Star-Spangled Banner," it becomes the official anthem of the United States Navy in 1889; is adopted by President Wilson in 1916 as official anthem for all U.S. armed forces; and is made the national anthem of the United States by Congress in 1931. The unique 15-star, 15-stripe design with a red stripe under the blue canton with stars (used from 1795 to 1818) of the huge flag made by Mary Young Pickersgill later seen by Key flying over Fort McHenry outside Baltimore in September 1814 during the Battle of Baltimore in a British attack becomes known as the "Star Spangled Banner Flag".
- 1818 – Flag with 20 stars and returned to the 13 stripes design of alternating red and white colors of 1777. It remains at 13 stripes hereafter to the present with only stars added for additional states admitted to the Union, on next following Independence Day, July 4. (Tennessee (1796), Ohio (1803), Louisiana (1812), Indiana (1816), Mississippi (1817) added from previous years). (An unofficial 16-star, 16-stripe flag had been made in Tennessee, and an unofficial 17-star, 13-stripe flag in Ohio.)
- 1819 – Flag with 21 stars (Illinois)
- 1820 – Flag with 23 stars (Alabama, Maine) first flag on Pikes Peak, (located in future Colorado)
- 1822 – Flag with 24 stars (Missouri)
- 1836 – Flag with 25 stars (Arkansas)
- 1837 – Flag with 26 stars (Michigan)
- 1845 – Flag with 27 stars (Florida)
- 1846 – Flag with 28 stars (Texas)
- 1847 – Flag with 29 stars (Iowa)
- 1848 – Flag with 30 stars (Wisconsin)
- 1851 – Flag with 31 stars (California)
- 1858 – Flag with 32 stars (Minnesota)
- 1859 – Flag with 33 stars (Oregon)
- 1861 – Flag with 34 stars; (Kansas). Even after the Southern states seceded from the Union, establishing the Confederate States of America, 16th President Abraham Lincoln would not allow any star to be removed from the American flag. The first National Flag of the Confederacy (nicknamed "The Stars and Bars") is adopted by the provisional government in the temporary capital of Montgomery, Alabama.
- 1863 – Flag with 35 stars (West Virginia, western counties withdrew from seceded Virginia)
- 1865 – Flag with 36 stars (Nevada)
- 1867 – Flag with 37 stars (Nebraska)
- 1869 – First flag on a U.S. postage stamp
- 1876 – Flag with 38 stars (Colorado)
- 1889 – Flag with 39 stars that never was. Flag manufacturers mistakenly believed that the two Dakotas would be admitted instead as one state and so manufactured this flag, some of which still exist. It was never an official flag.
- 1890 – Flag with 42 stars that never was. It was anticipated that Idaho would be admitted after July 4 and manufacturers tried to get a headstart by making 42-star flags. Idaho was admitted on July 3. As Wyoming was admitted July 10, few of the official 43 star flags were manufactured.
- 1890 – Flag with 43 stars (North Dakota, South Dakota, Montana, Washington, Idaho)
- 1891 – Flag with 44 stars (Wyoming)
- 1892 – "Pledge of Allegiance" first published in a magazine called "The Youth's Companion", written by Francis Bellamy. Revised in 1954.
- 1896 – Flag with 45 stars (Utah)
- 1897 – Adoption of State Flag Desecration Statutes – By the late 1800s an organized flag protection movement was born in reaction to perceived commercial and political misuse of the flag. After supporters failed to obtain federal legislation, Illinois, Pennsylvania, and South Dakota became the first States to adopt flag desecration statutes. By 1932, all of the States had adopted flag desecration laws. In general, these State laws outlawed: (i) placing any kind of marking on the flag, whether for commercial, political, or other purposes; (ii) using the flag in any form of advertising; and (iii) publicly mutilating, trampling, defacing, defiling, defying or casting contempt, either by words or by act, upon the flag. Under the model flag desecration law, the term "flag" was defined to include any flag, standard, ensign, or color, or any representation of such made of any substance whatsoever and of any size that evidently purported to be said flag or a picture or representation thereof, upon which shall be shown the colors, the stars and stripes in any number, or by which the person seeing the same without deliberation may believe the same to represent the flag of the U.S.
- 1907 – Halter v. Nebraska (205 U.S. 34) – The U.S. Supreme Court held that although the flag was a federal creation, the States had the authority to promulgate flag desecration laws under their general police power to safeguard public safety and welfare. Halter involved a conviction of two businessmen selling "Stars and Stripes" brand beer with representations of the U.S. flag affixed to the labels. The defendants did not raise any constitutional First Amendment claim.
- 1908 – Flag with 46 stars (Oklahoma)
- 1909 – Explorer Robert Peary places the flag his wife sewed atop the North Pole. He left pieces of another flag along the way. He was never censured for his action.
- 1912 – Flag with 48 stars (New Mexico, Arizona) completing "Lower 48" continental U.S. Becomes longest serving flag of 47 years 1912–1959. (An unofficial 47-star flag was made for commemorative purposes in New Mexico.)
- 1931 – Stromberg v. California (283 U.S. 359) – The Supreme Court found that a State statute prohibiting the display of a "red flag" as a sign of opposition to organized government unconstitutionally infringed on the defendant's First Amendment rights. Stromberg represented the Court's first declaration that "symbolic speech" was protected by the First Amendment.
- 1942 – Federal Flag Code (36 U.S.C. 171 et seq.) – On June 22, 1942, 32nd President Franklin D. Roosevelt approved the Federal Flag Code, providing for uniform guidelines for the display and respect shown to the flag. The Flag Code does not prescribe any penalties for non-compliance nor does it include any enforcement provisions, rather it functions simply as a guide for voluntary civilian compliance.
- 1943 – West Virginia Board of Education v. Barnette (319 U.S. 624) – The Supreme Court held that public school children could not be compelled to salute the U.S. flag. In a now famous passage, Justice Robert H. Jackson highlighted the importance of freedom of expression under the First Amendment: "Freedom to differ is not limited to things that do not matter much. That would be a mere shadow of freedom. The test of its substance is the right to differ as to things that touch the heart of the existing order. If there is any fixed star in our constitutional constellation it is that no official, high or petty, can prescribe what shall be orthodox in politics, nationalism, religion or other matters of opinion."
- 1945 – The flag that flew over Pearl Harbor naval base in Hawaii on Sunday, December 7, 1941, is flown over the White House on August 14, 1945, "V-J Day" when the Japanese accepted surrender terms.
- 1949 August 3 – 33rd President Harry Truman signs bill requesting the President call for a Flag Day (June 14) observance each year by proclamation.
- 1954 – By act of Congress, the words "Under God" are inserted into the Pledge of Allegiance
- 1959 – Flag with 49 stars (Alaska)
- 1960 – Flag with 50 stars (Hawaii). In 2008 it overtook the "Lower 48" flag as the longest-serving United States flag (66 years and counting as of 2026).
- 1963 – American Flag placed on top of Mount Everest in the Himalayas in Nepal, by Barry Bishop.
- 1968 – Adoption of Federal Flag Desecration Law (18 U.S.C. 700 et seq.) – Congress approved the first federal flag desecration law in the wake of a highly publicized Central Park flag burning incident in New York City in protest of the Vietnam War. The federal law made it illegal to "knowingly" cast "contempt" upon "any flag of the United States by publicly mutilating, defacing, defiling, burning or trampling upon it." The law defined flag in an expansive manner similar to most States.
- 1969 – July 20 – Astronauts Neil Armstrong with Edwin "Buzz" Aldrin of Apollo 11 places the American flag on the Moon at Tranquillity Base, using the Lunar Flag Assembly.
- 1969 – Street v. New York (394 U.S. 576) – The Supreme Court held that New York State could not convict a person based on his verbal remarks disparaging the flag. Street was arrested after he learned of the shooting of civil rights leader James Meredith and reacted by burning his own flag and exclaiming to a small crowd that if the government could allow Meredith to be killed, "we don't need no damn flag." The Court avoided deciding whether flag burning was protected by the First Amendment, and instead overturned the conviction based on Street's oral remarks. In Street, the Court found there was not a sufficient governmental interest to warrant regulating verbal criticism of the flag.
- 1972 – Smith v. Goguen (415 U.S. 94) – The Supreme Court held that Massachusetts could not prosecute a person for wearing a small cloth replica of the flag on the seat of his pants based on a state law making it a crime to publicly treat the flag of the United States with "contempt". The Massachusetts statute was held to be unconstitutionally "void for vagueness."
- 1974 – Spence v. Washington (418 U.S. 405) – The Supreme Court held that the State of Washington could not convict a person for attaching removable tape in the form of a peace sign to a flag. The defendant had attached the tape to his flag and draped it outside of his window in protest of the 1970 U.S. invasion of Cambodia and the Kent State killings. The Court again found under the First Amendment there was not a sufficient governmental interest to justify regulating this form of symbolic speech. Although not a flag burning case, this represented the first time the Court had clearly stated that protest involving the physical use of the flag should be seen as a form of protected expression under the First Amendment.
- 1970–1980 – Revision of State Flag Desecration Statutes – During this period legislatures in some 20 states narrowed the scope of their flag desecration laws in an effort to conform to perceived Constitutional restrictions under the Street, Smith, and Spence cases and to more generally parallel the Federal Law (i.e., focusing more specifically on mutilation and other forms of physical desecration, rather than verbal abuse or commercial or political misuse).
- 1989 – Texas v. Johnson (491 U.S. 397) – The Supreme Court upheld the Texas Court of Criminal appeals finding that Texas law – making it a crime to "desecrate" or otherwise "mistreat" the flag in a way the "actor knows will seriously offend one or more persons" – was unconstitutional as applied. This was the first time the Supreme Court had directly considered the applicability of the First Amendment to flag burning. Gregory Johnson, a member of the Revolutionary Communist Party, was arrested during a demonstration outside of the 1984 Republican National Convention in Dallas after he set fire to a flag while protesters chanted "America, the red, white, and blue, we spit on you." In a 5–4 decision authored by Justice William Brennan, the Court first found that burning the flag was a form of symbolic speech subject to protection under the First Amendment. The Court also determined that under United States v. O'Brien, 391 U.S. 367 (1968), since the State law was related to the suppression of freedom of expression, the conviction could only be upheld if Texas could demonstrate a "compelling" interest in its law. The Court next found that Texas' asserted interest in "protecting the peace" was not implicated under the facts of the case. Finally, while the Court acknowledged that Texas had a legitimate interest in preserving the flag as a "symbol of national unity", this interest was not sufficiently compelling to justify a "content based" legal restriction (i.e., the law was not based on protecting the physical integrity of the flag in all circumstances, but was designed to protect it from symbolic protest likely to cause offense to others).
- 1989 – Revision of Federal Flag Desecration Statute – Pursuant to the Flag Protection Act of 1989, Congress amended the 1968 federal flag desecration statute in an effort to make it "content neutral" and conform to the Constitutional requirements of the Johnson case. As a result, the 1989 Act sought to prohibit flag desecration under all circumstances by deleting the statutory requirement that the conduct cast contempt upon the flag and narrowing the definition of the term "flag" so that its meaning was not based on the observation of third parties.
- 1990 – United States v. Eichman (496 U.S. 310) – Passage of the Flag Protection Act of 1989 resulted in a number of flag burning incidents protesting the new law. The Supreme Court overturned several flag burning convictions brought under the Flag Protection Act. The Court held that notwithstanding Congress' effort to adopt a more content neutral law, the federal law continued to be principally aimed at limiting symbolic speech.
- 1990 – Rejection of Constitutional Amendment – Following the Eichman decision, Congress considered and rejected a Constitutional amendment specifying that "the Congress and the States have the power to prohibit the physical desecration of the flag of the United States." The amendment failed to muster the necessary two-thirds Congressional majorities, as it was supported by only a 254–177 margin in the House (290 votes were necessary) and a 58–42 margin in the Senate (67 votes were necessary).
- 1995 – The Flag Desecration Constitutional Amendment is narrowly defeated in the U.S. Senate. The amendment to the Constitution would make burning the flag a punishable crime.
- 2005 – U.S. House of Representatives passes a new flag desecration constitutional amendment.
- 2006 – Constitutional amendment again does not pass the Senate, falling one vote short of the required two-thirds super-majority.
- 2007 – The longevity in years used of the present 50-star flag became tied with that of the 48-star flag, both having 47 years of continuous use. After this date, the 50-star flag became the longest-used version of the U.S. flag.

== See also ==
- Flag Acts (United States)
