= Margaret Manny =

Margaret Manny was a milliner in colonial Philadelphia who made flags for the United States during the American Revolution. She may have made the Continental Union Flag for the Continental Navy.

== Biography ==
Continental Union Flag

Manny began making jacks and ensigns for ships as early as December 1774. She also supposedly made the Continental Union Flag, or Continental Colors, first flown by John Paul Jones aboard the Alfred on December 3, 1775. The flag is considered to be the first national flag of the United States of America. This flag was thirteen red and white stripes, representing the union of the thirteen colonies, together with the combined crosses of St. Andrew and St. George in the canton or upper left quadrant retained from the Union Jack.

While Betsy Ross is well known, not much is known about Margaret Manny, possibly because she had fewer articulate friends and relatives to build a story around her. What is known for sure is that Margaret Manny, a milliner, received from James Wharton of Philadelphia, 49 yards of broad bunting and 52 ^{1}/_{2} yards of the narrow width with which to prepare an ensign. The goods were charged to the account of the ship Alfred, flagship of the squadron and, with 30 guns, largest of the first four.

== Sources ==
- Leepson, Marc Flag: An American Biography 2004. ISBN 0-312-32308-5
- Tuchman, Barbara The First Salute: A View of the American Revolution. 1988. ISBN 0-394-55333-0
