= Flag of the East India Company =

Historical flag

East India Company
- Use: Company flag and ensign
- Adopted: 1801
- Relinquished: 1858
- Design: Horizontal stripes, alternating red and white, with the Union Jack in the canton

The East India Company was chartered in England in 1600. The flag was altered as the nation changed from England to Great Britain to the United Kingdom. It was initially a red and white striped ensign with the flag of England in the canton. The flag displayed in the canton was later replaced by the flag of Great Britain and then the flag of the United Kingdom, as the nation developed.

== Early years ==
The flag of the Company with the flag of England in the canton

Variant with thirteen stripes

Upon receiving a Royal Charter to trade in the Indian Ocean from Queen Elizabeth I in 1600, the English East India Company adopted a flag of red and white stripes (varying from nine to thirteen stripes in total), with the flag of England in the canton.

The flag caused problems for the East India Company at first when trading in the Far East, because of its use of the Saint George's Cross. In Japan in 1616, the Company's ships were turned away because the cross on the flag was viewed as a symbol of Christianity, which the Japanese had banned in 1614. The Lê dynasty in Tonkin banned the Company from using the flag, believing the cross on it to be an endorsement of Christianity, promotion of which the Tonkinese had prohibited. The Company's trading rivals, the Dutch East India Company, argued on the Company's behalf that the cross was a symbol of the English nation and not of Christianity, but the Tonkinese insisted on banning the flying of the flag unless the cross was removed. In 1673, when the Company attempted to restart trade with Japan, they initially declared they would not change their flag. However, after receiving local advice and a demand for an explanation from the Japanese authorities, the Company began using a flag with red and white stripes, but without the flag of England on it, for trading in the Far East.

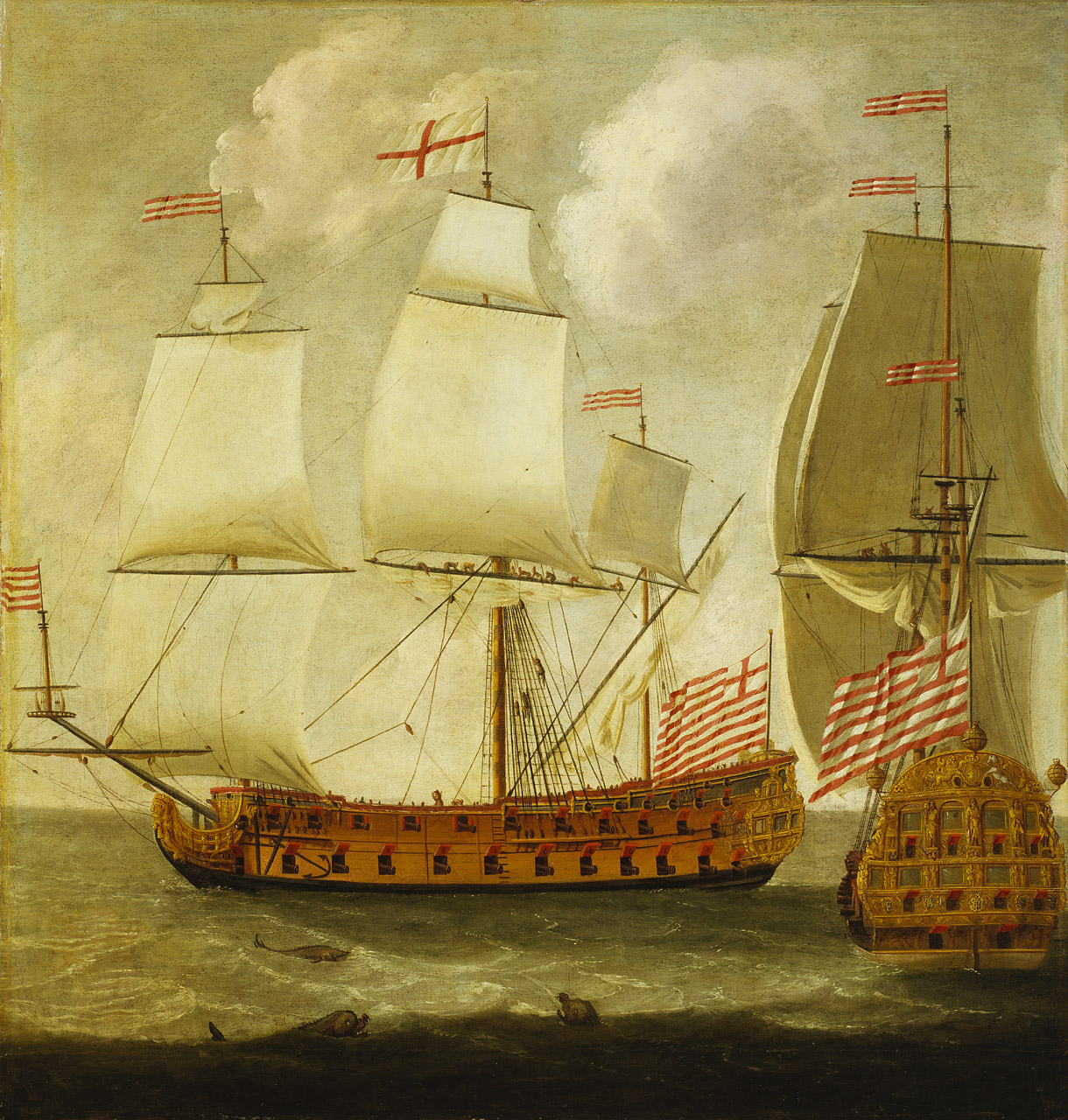
Two views of an East India Company ship, painted with a different number of stripes on each flag

In 1682 in Batavia, Dutch East Indies (modern-day Jakarta), the Company flag was at the centre of tensions between the English and Dutch governments after soldiers from the Dutch East India Company were accused of tearing down one of the Company flags. Although the Dutch sent warships to reinforce the area, the event came to nothing, as the person making the accusation was not present on Batavia, and neither the Company directors nor King Charles II of England had any desire to enter into a military conflict with the Dutch over the matter.

== Great Britain ==
The flag of the Company with the flag of Great Britain in the canton

In 1603, when King James VI of Scotland ascended to the English throne, thus unifying the Crowns of England and Scotland, he created a combined flag of both nations, to be used for a united British state. However, the Parliament of England and Parliament of Scotland were reluctant to unite, and wished that the countries remain separate. The king retained his flag for personal use as the King's Colours. The East India Company continued using their ensign with the flag of England in the canton. In 1668, King Charles II transferred control of Bombay to the East India Company. The Company then adopted a new flag including the King's Colours, as was shown when blue cloth, in addition to red and white, was requested for making a new flag for the fort in Bombay "if the King's colours were to be kept there; 'if not, white and red will be sufficient'". The King's Colours were later formally adopted as the flag of Great Britain when the Kingdom of Great Britain was formed by the Acts of Union 1707 at the behest of Queen Anne.

=== Comparison with American flag ===
The Continental Union Flag, 1775

The flag of the East India Company is considered to have inspired the 1775 Continental Union Flag, the first flag of the United States, as the two flags were of the same design. This connection is attributed to numerous sources. Benjamin Franklin of Pennsylvania once gave a speech endorsing the adoption of the Company's flag by the United States as their national flag. He said to George Washington of Virginia, "While the field of your flag must be new in the details of its design, it need not be entirely new in its elements. There is already in use a flag, I refer to the flag of the East India Company." This was a way of symbolising American loyalty to the Crown as well as the United States' aspirations, like those of the East India Company, to be self-governing. Some colonists also felt that the Company could be a powerful ally in the American War of Independence, as they shared similar aims and grievances against Crown tax policies. Colonists therefore flew the Company's flag, to endorse the Company.

However, the theory that the Continental Union Flag was a direct descendant of the flag of the East India Company has been criticised as lacking written evidence. On the other hand, the resemblance is obvious, and a number of the Founding Fathers of the United States were aware of the East India Company's activities and of their free administration of India under Company rule.

== United Kingdom ==
In 1801, following the unification of Great Britain and the Kingdom of Ireland into the United Kingdom of Great Britain and Ireland, the Union Flag was changed to incorporate Saint Patrick's Saltire. Accordingly, the flag of the East India Company was updated to display the new flag in the canton.

In 1858, the British government passed the Government of India Act, nationalising the East India Company and taking over all of their possessions within India, where they would be considered legally a part of the British Raj. Company rule in India thus ended, and the Company flag ceased to have official status.

== Gallery ==
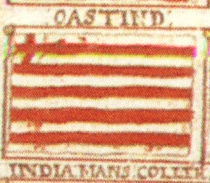
Downman (1685)

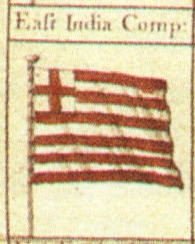
Lens (1700)

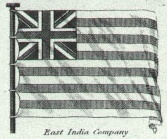
Rees (1820)

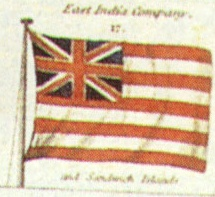
Laurie (1842)

== See also ==
- Historical flags of the British Empire and the overseas territories
- Star of India (flag)
