= Continental Union Flag =

First national flag of the United States

- De facto flag of the United States 1776–1777
- Other names: first American flag, Cambridge Flag, and Grand Union Flag
- Use: National flag and ensign
- Adopted: December 3, 1775 (250 years ago)
- Relinquished: June 14, 1777
- Design: A British Union flag with thirteen horizontal stripes, alternating red and white, in the field.

The Continental Union Flag (often referred to as the first American flag, Cambridge Flag, and Grand Union Flag) was the flag of the United Colonies from 1775 to 1776, and the de facto flag of the United States until 1777, when the 13-star flag was adopted by the Continental Congress. It was a variant of the British Red Ensign.

The Continental Union Flag was so called because it combined the British Union Flag (denoting the kingdoms of England and Scotland) with thirteen stripes (representing the United Colonies). The canton consists of the Union flag, while the field is thirteen horizontal stripes, alternating red and white. The flag made its first appearance on December 3, 1775, when it was hoisted at the commissioning of Admiral Esek Hopkins' flagship USS Alfred on the western shore of the Delaware River at Philadelphia.

== Origin of name ==
Known during the American Revolution as the Continental Union Flag, Continental Colours, American flag, and flag of the United Colonies; the name was derived from a combination of the words "Continental," referring to the Continental Congress, and "Union Flag," referring to the British Union Flag of 1707 then flown in America.

Although the flag is often referred to as the "Cambridge Flag" and "Grand Union Flag," the terms did not come into use until the 19th century. While it has been claimed the more recent moniker, Grand Union Flag, was first applied to the flag by G. Henry Preble in his Reconstruction era book Our Flag, the first substantiated use of the name came from Philadelphia resident T. Westcott in 1852 when replying to an inquiry made in Notes and Queries, a London periodical, as to the origin of the U.S. flag.

== Design ==
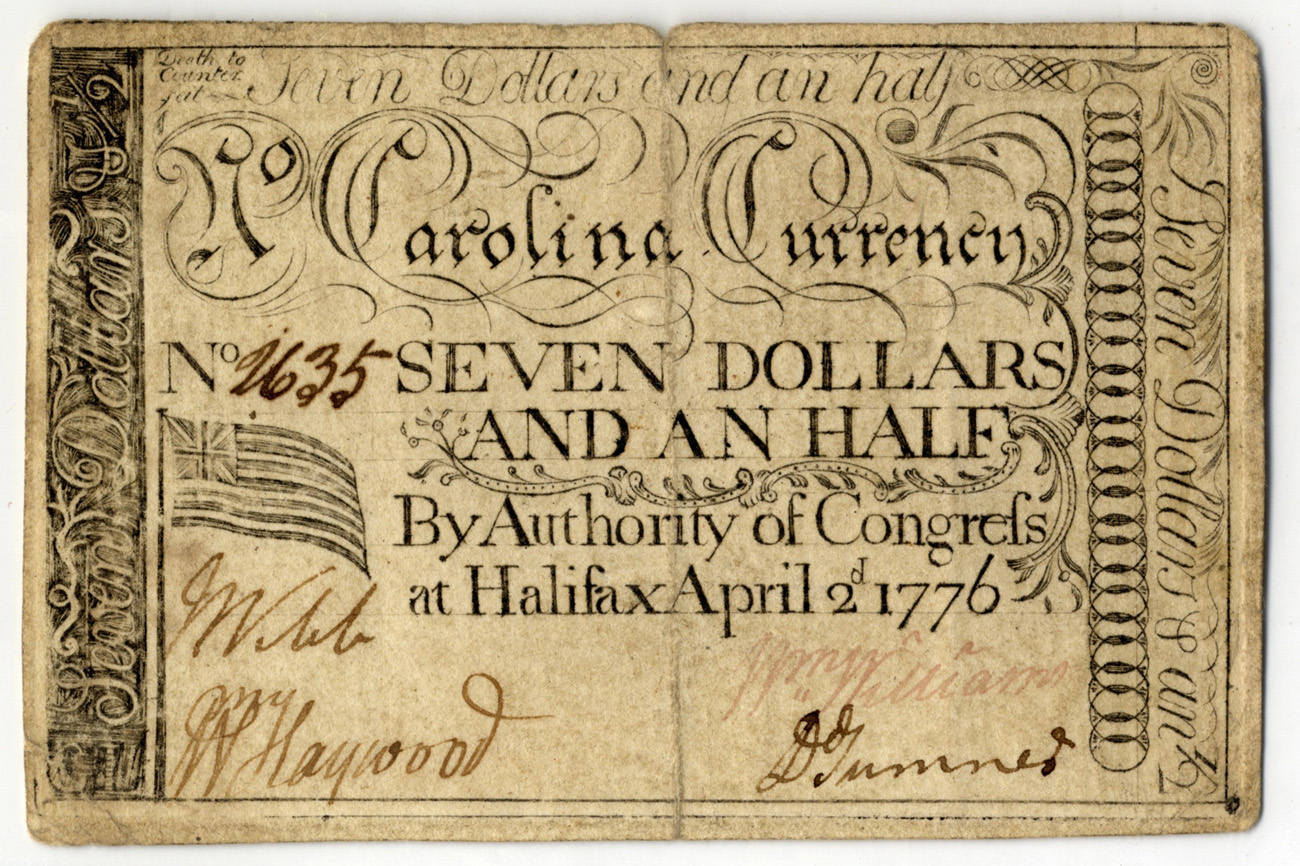
North Carolina $7½ bill issued at Halifax on April 2, 1776, featuring the Continental Union Flag fully hoisted

In a letter to members of the Continental Congress from Virginia dated January 5, 1776, the Naval Committee described the Continental Union Flag as the British "Union flag... striped red and white in the field." Having seen the Continental Union Flag flying aboard Admiral Esek Hopkins' flagship a few days later, a Philadelphia resident further defined the flag as a British "Union flag, with 13 stripes in the field, emblematical of the Thirteen United Colonies."

British author and professor and Nick Groom believes incorporation of the Union Jack of 1707 in the canton of the Continental Union Flag suggests the Americans adopted it, not as a protest against the British Ministry, but as a profession of loyalty to King George. This view is shared by Laurie Calkhoven, a biographer of George Washington, who suggests it was designed to reflect their hope for reconciliation.

The Continental Union Flag is strikingly similar to the Flag of the East India Company. The red and white stripes on that flag, however, varied from nine to fifteen. One theory is that Americans would have been somewhat familiar with the East India Company flag and it may have influenced the design.

== History ==
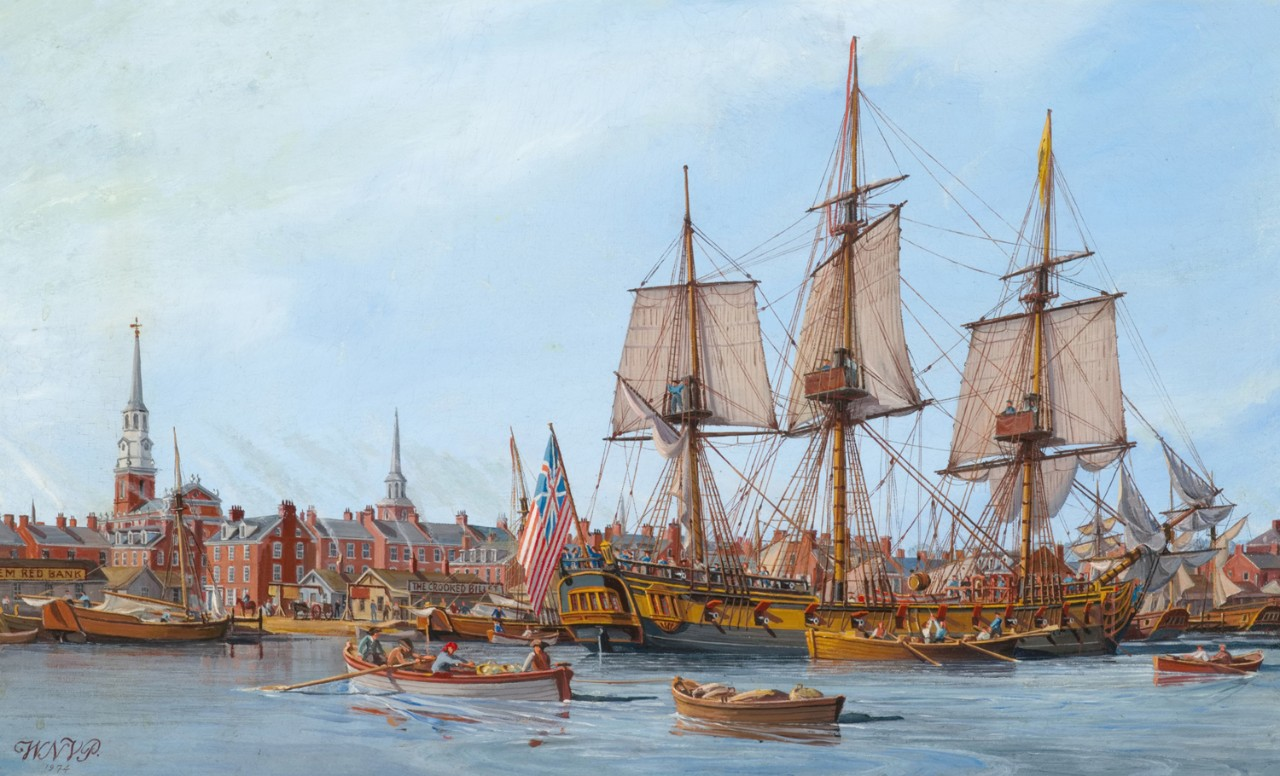
The Continental Ship Alfred by W. Nowland Van Powell, depicting Continental Navy Lieutenant John Paul Jones first hoisting the flag at Philadelphia on December 3, 1775

By the end of 1775, during the first year of the Revolutionary War, the Continental Congress operated as a de facto war government, who had authorized the creation of the Continental Army, the Navy, and Marines. A new flag was needed to represent both the Congress and the United Colonies, with a banner distinct from the Red Ensign, White Ensign, and Blue Ensign flown by British ships and the Union Flag carried on land by British troops. The emerging states had been using their own independent flags, with Massachusetts Bay using the Taunton Flag, and New York using the George Rex Flag, prior to the adoption of united colors. It is not known for certain when or by whom the Continental Union Flag design was created, but it could easily be produced by sewing white stripes onto the Red Ensign.

American sailors first hoisted the Continental Union Flag on the warship Alfred, in the harbor on the western shore of the Delaware River at Philadelphia, Pennsylvania, on December 3, 1775, under the command of the new appointed Lieutenant John Paul Jones of the formative Continental Navy. The event was documented in letters to Congress and eyewitness accounts. The "Alfred" flag has been credited to Margaret Manny. The flag was also used as a naval ensign and garrison flag throughout 1776 and early 1777.

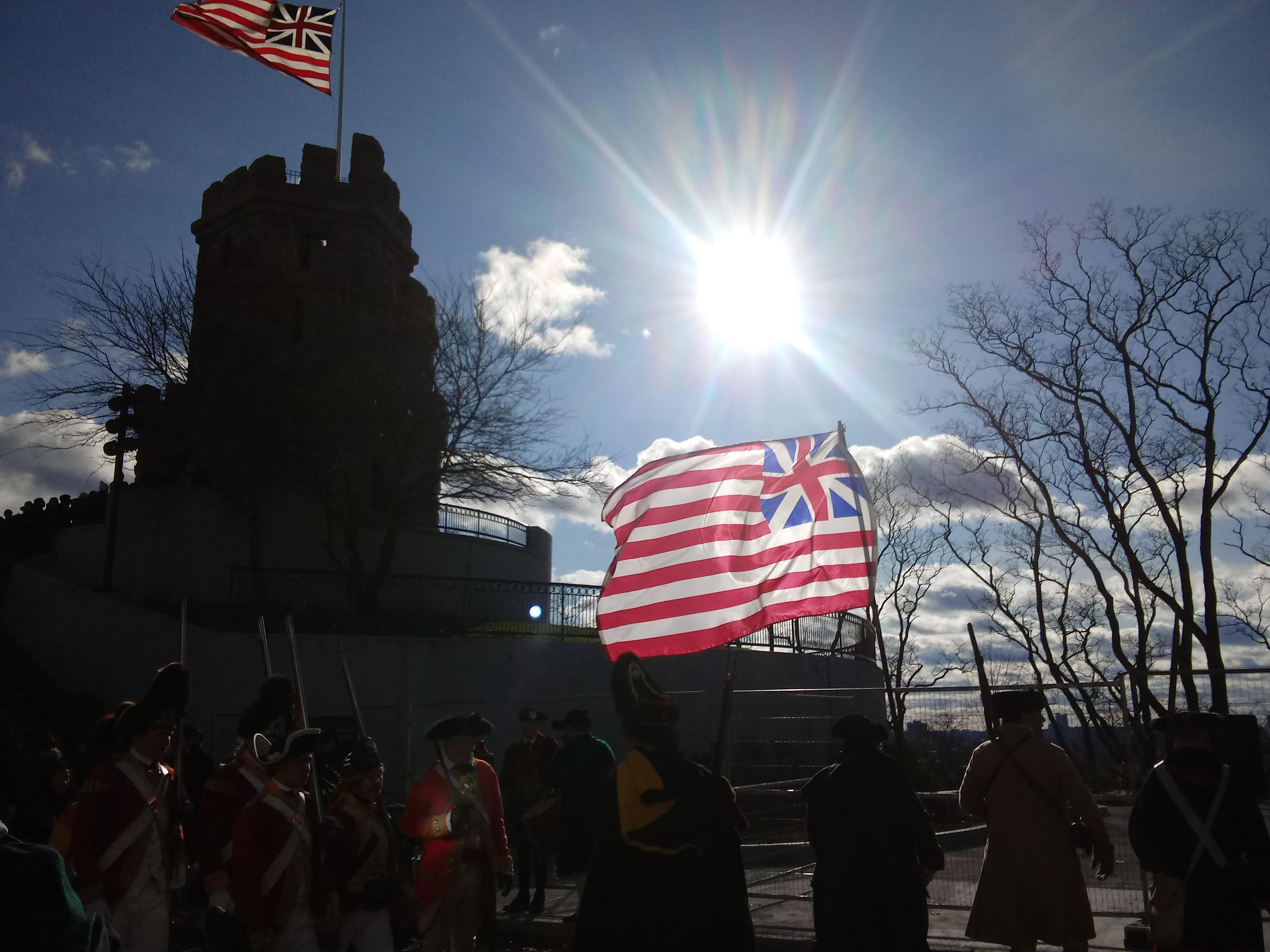
244th First Flag Raising Ceremony atop Prospect Hill, Massachusetts

It was widely believed that the flag was raised by George Washington's army on January 2, 1776, at Prospect Hill in Charlestown (present-day Somerville), near his headquarters at Cambridge, Massachusetts (across the Charles River to the north from Boston), which was then surrounding and laying siege to the British forces then occupying the city. It is also stated that the flag was interpreted by British military observers in Boston as a sign of surrender. However, some scholars dispute the traditional account and conclude that the flag raised at Prospect Hill was probably the British Union flag, though subsequent research supports the contrary. The city of Somerville hosts an annual commemoration of the flag raising each January.

The Continental Union Flag became obsolete after the passing of the Flag Act of 1777 by the Second Continental Congress. The new national flag replaced the British Union flag in the canton with thirteen stars (representing the United States) on a blue field. The resolution describes only a "new constellation" for the arrangement of the white stars in the blue canton and so overall designs were later interpreted and made with rows, columns, a square with one star in the center, a circle, and various other designs.

== See also ==
- List of flags of the United States
- Timeline of the flag of the United States

== Sources ==
- Ansoff, Peter (2006). "The Flag on Prospect Hill". Raven: A Journal of Vexillology. 13: 77–100. doi:10.5840/raven2006134. ISSN 1071-0043. LCCN 94642220.
- Clark, William Bell, ed. (1968). Naval Documents of the American Revolution. Vol. 3. Washington: U.S. Government Printing Office. LCCN 64-60087 – via Internet Archive.
- DeLear, Byron (2014). "Revisiting the Flag at Prospect Hill: Grand Union or Just British?" (PDF). Raven: A Journal of Vexillology. 21: 19–70. doi:10.5840/raven2014213.
- Fawcett, Charles (October 1937). "The Striped Flag of the East India Company, and its Connexion with the American 'Stars and Stripes'". Mariner's Mirror.
- John Paul Jones' Memoir of the American Revolution presented to King Louis XVI of France. Translated by Gawalt, Gerard W. Introduction by John R. Sellers. Washington: U.S. Government Printing Office. 1979. ISBN 0-8444-0264-8. LCCN 78-006650. OCLC 3844197. OL 4719731M – via Internet Archive.
- Hamilton, Schuyler (1853). History of the National Flag of the United States of America. Philadelphia: Lippincott, Grambo & Co.
- Hopkins, Albert C. (September 30, 1893). "Historic American Flags". The School Journal. XLVII (12) – via Internet Archive.
- Leepson, Marc (2006). Flag: An American Biography. Macmillan. ISBN 978-0312323097.
- Preble, George Henry (1872). Our Flag. Albany: Joel Munsell. LCCN 09026595. OCLC 990016. OL 7159532M – via Internet Archive.
