= Union Square (Somerville) =

Neighborhood in Somerville, Massachusetts

Coordinates: 42.3797°N 71.0964°W

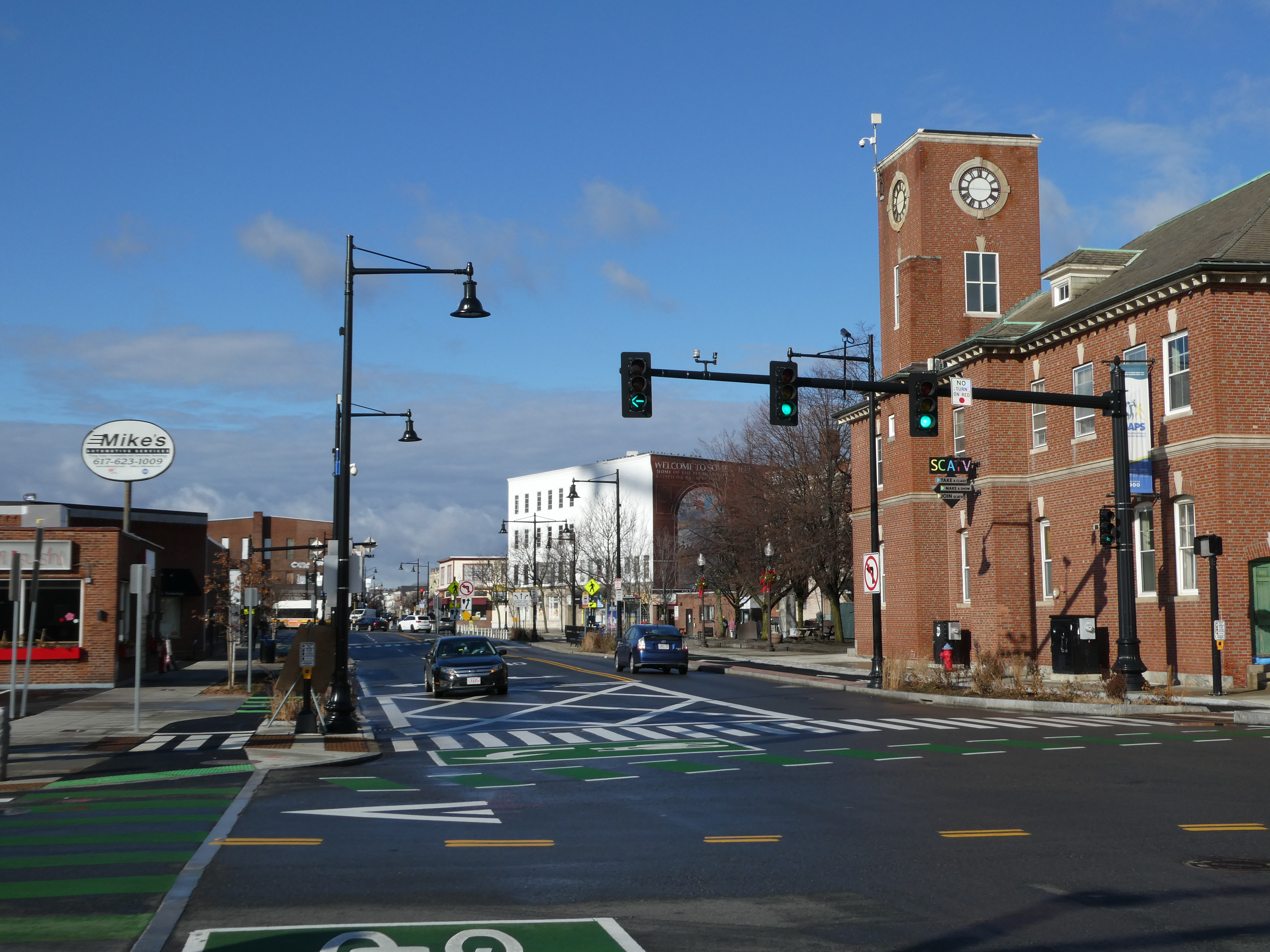
Union Square in December 2021

Union Square is a neighborhood in the southeastern part of Somerville, Massachusetts, United States. It is centered on Union Square proper, which is located at the intersection of Washington Street, Webster Avenue, and Somerville Avenue.

The name "Union Square" comes from the square having been used as a recruitment and mustering site for the Union Army in the Civil War. A plaque commemorating the mustering site sits at the southwestern corner of the square between Somerville Avenue and Washington Street, and the Prospect Hill Monument is located several blocks away atop Prospect Hill. Union Square is now the commercial center of a primarily residential neighborhood with many restaurants, bars and neighborhood stores.

As the oldest and largest commercial area in the city, Union Square is home to a number of community institutions, including the Somerville Police headquarters, Somerville Community Access Television (SCATV), and Boston Free Radio.

== History ==
=== Sand Pit Square ===
Union Square was Somerville's earliest commercial district to develop when it was still a part of Charlestown. Early trade routes passed through the square and a tavern was built there as early as 1770. Originally called "Sand Pit Square," the area's sandy, clay pit-dotted pastures yielded a fine grade of silica used in glass and brick-making.

=== American Revolution ===
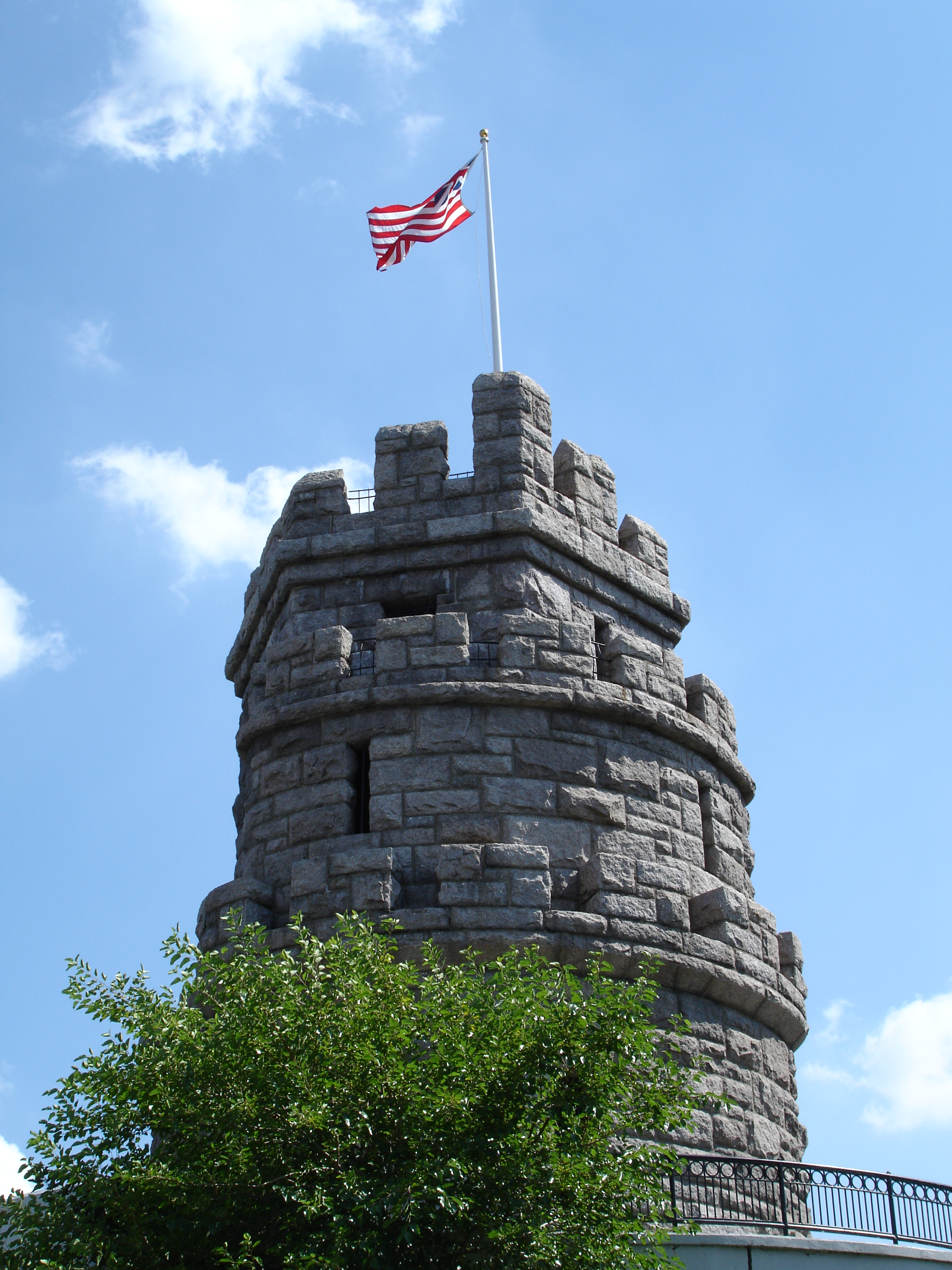
The Continental Union Flag flying above Prospect Hill Monument, overlooking Union Square, in 2005.

It was during the American Revolution that Union Square took center stage. Because of its location and height providing panoramic views and control of Charlestown, Somerville, and Cambridge, Prospect Hill had great strategic importance in the Revolutionary War and became known as the "Citadel". The castle, dedicated in 1903, is a monument commemorating the fortifications atop the hill during that war. A tablet inside reads: "This tablet is erected in memory of the soldiers of the Revolution and of the Civil War who encamped on Prospect Hill and of the banners under which they valiantly fought."

Somerville is one of several municipalities claiming to have hosted the first raising of the Continental Union Flag (the flag of the United Colonies from 1775 to 1776 and de facto flag of the United States until 1777, when the 13 star flag was adopted). Tradition claims George Washington raised it on Prospect Hill on January 1, 1776, and a plaque there indicates such. However, some scholars dispute these traditional accounts, concluding the flag raised at Prospect Hill was probably a British Union Flag. Since a favorable pardon was then being offered to the rebelling colonists, the raising of a flag similar or identical to the Union Flag was briefly mistaken for a gesture of allegiance to the Crown.

=== Industry growth ===
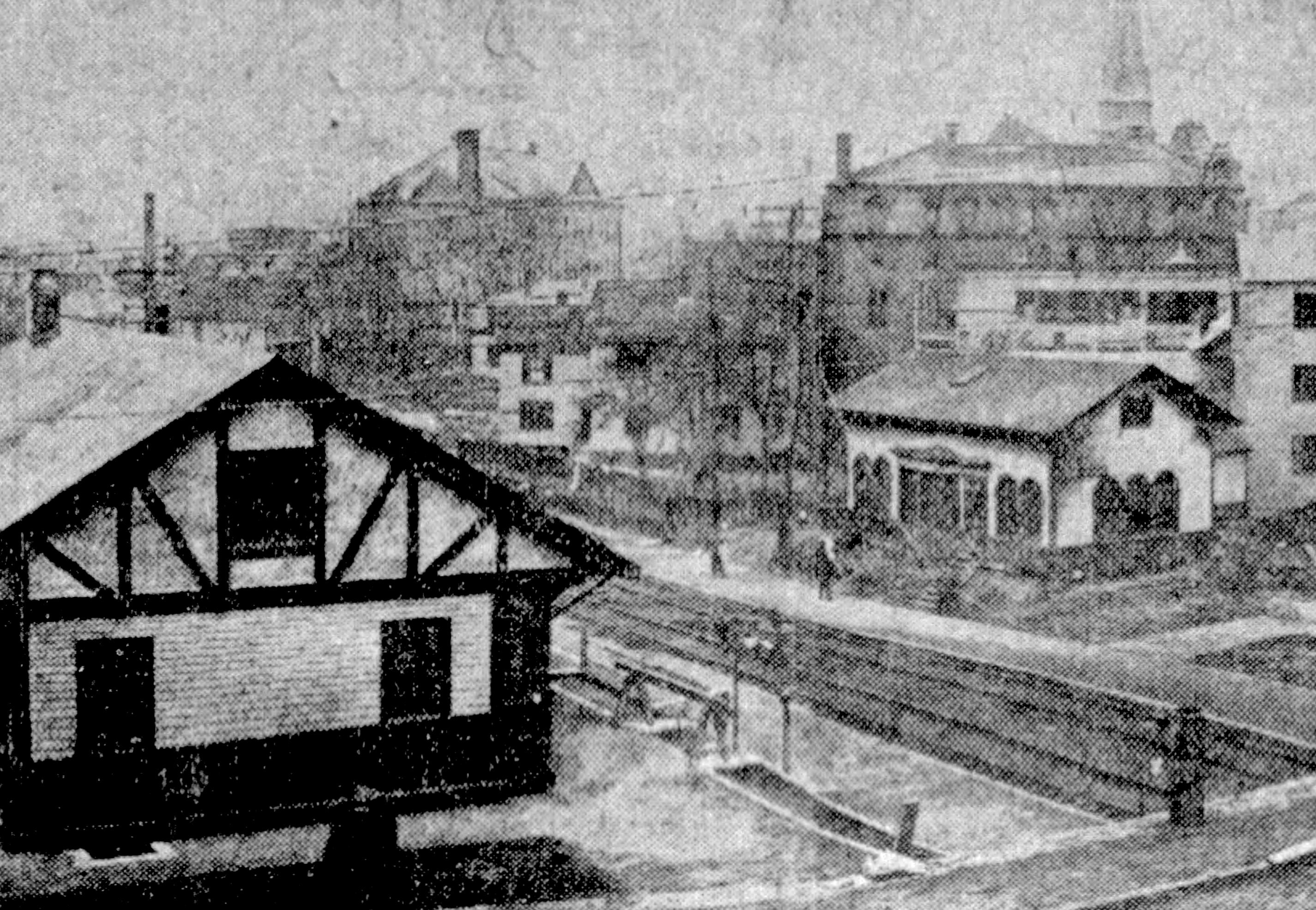
New (left) and old Union Square station buildings on the Fitchburg Railroad in 1911

In its early years, Somerville was an agricultural suburb, supplying the growing urban area surrounding Boston. For a time the Union Square area was known as Milk Row after the small farms surrounding it.

Union Square became a major commercial center during the early 19th century due to its location at an important crossroads. When the Warren Bridge opened to link Charlestown and Boston in 1828, it caused a considerable increase in traffic along Washington Street and Charlestown Lane (now Somerville Avenue). Railroad access began with the opening of the Fitchburg Railroad in 1843 and then opening of the Union Square railroad station just west of Webster Avenue. The Boynton Yards area south of the rail line and east of Union Square was created in 1874 when the swampy ground was filled with material from the top of Prospect Hill. It became a meat packing and manufacturing district, with a slaughterhouse, brickyard, glass shop, and later other industries.

After 1853, the square was known as Liberty Pole Square, in honor of the liberty pole erected there by anti-slavery firemen. In 1861 it was again renamed as Union Square as a pro-reunification gesture for the American Civil War and after the square's Revolutionary War history.

In 1917, the first Marshmallow Fluff to be sold in stores was produced in Union Square. In honor of this, since 2006 an annual Somerville Fluff Festival has been held in Union Square.

Service to the Union Square railroad station ended in 1938, as some local stops on the Fitchburg Railroad were dropped due to competition from streetcars. By then, Union Square was well served, first by Boston Elevated Railway streetcars, then by buses.

=== Commerce and gentrification ===
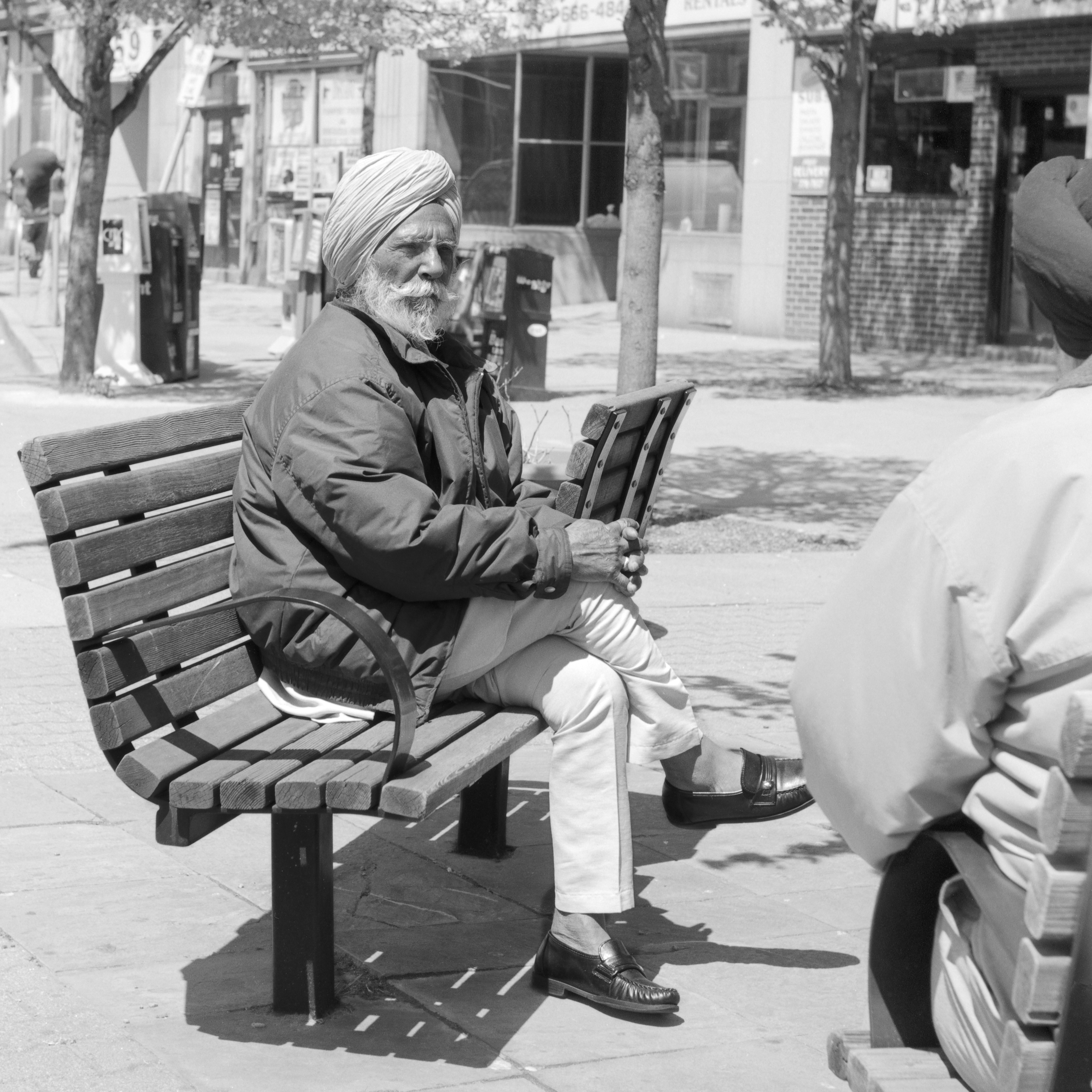
Members of the Sikh community gathering in Union Square

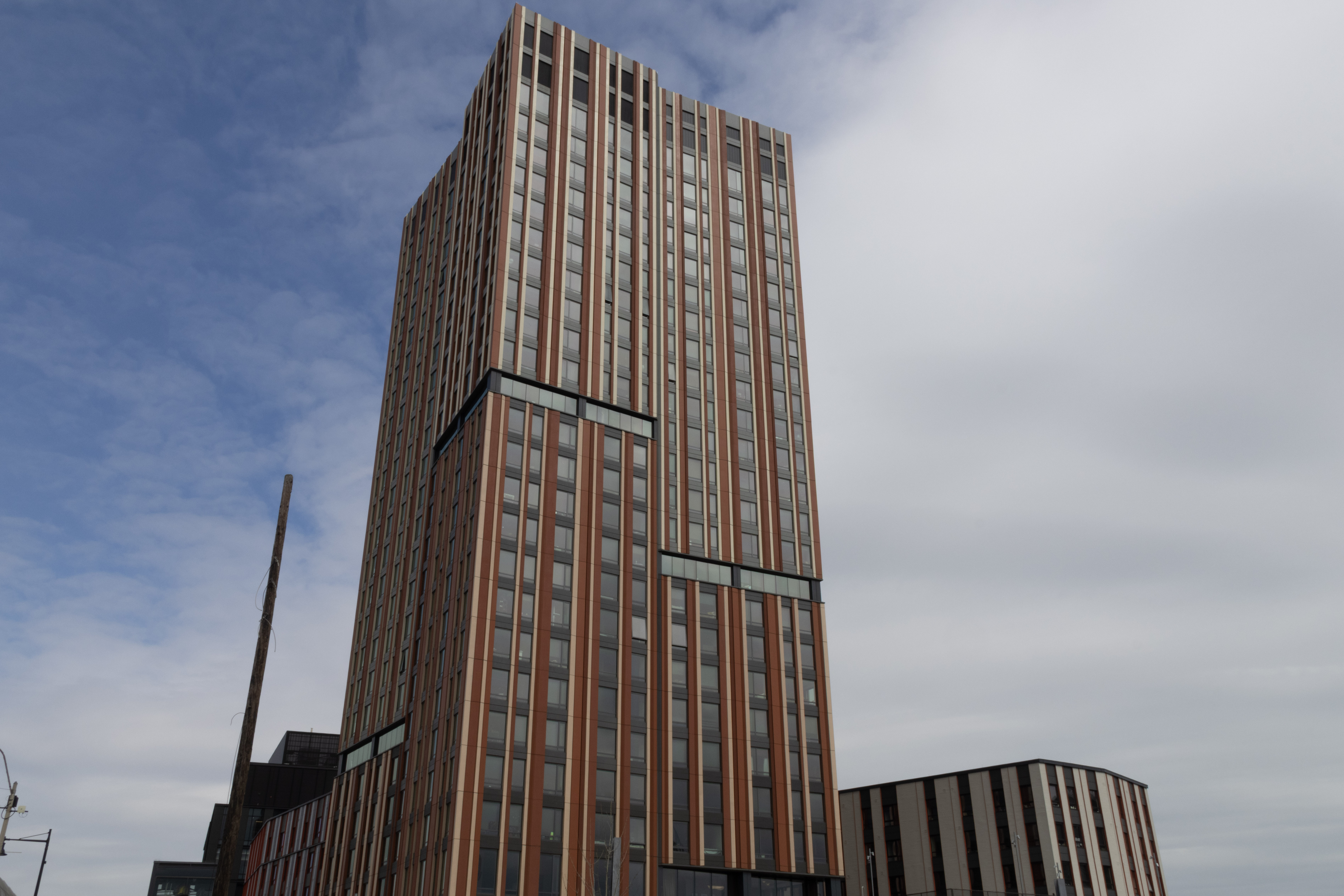
Prospect Union Square, a residential building that opened in 2023, seen here in 2026.

Like much of Somerville, Union Square suffered economic decline in the 20th century as wealthy residents moved to more distant suburbs and manufacturing moved away from the area. The city began planning for a revitalization of Boynton Yards in the 1980s, including the construction of South Street to allow trucks to serve lots once only reachable by rail. The area proceeded to attract new manufacturing, including Taza Chocolate, several breweries, and other food companies. The city approved a cluster of four life sciences laboratory-office buildings (the first in Somerville), of which 101 South Street opened in 2022, 808 Windsor is expected to open in 2024.

With rents lower than nearby Cambridge, Union Square attracted new immigrant populations towards the end of the 20th century, including large groups of Brazilian, Punjabi, and Sikh residents. Many markets in the area are run by and cater to the various ethnic groups that live in and around Union Square.

Union Square's location at the juncture of working-class East Somerville and the city's tonier western sections have made it the focal point of changing demographics. More upscale cafes, bars, and restaurants have opened since the 1990s, bringing gentrification deeper into Somerville. Union Square Main Streets, a local development group, began running a Saturday morning farmers' market in 2005 as one of its first visible efforts in the square. A landscaped community garden with regularly scheduled concerts and artistic events sits just outside Union Square at the site of an old school.

== Transportation ==
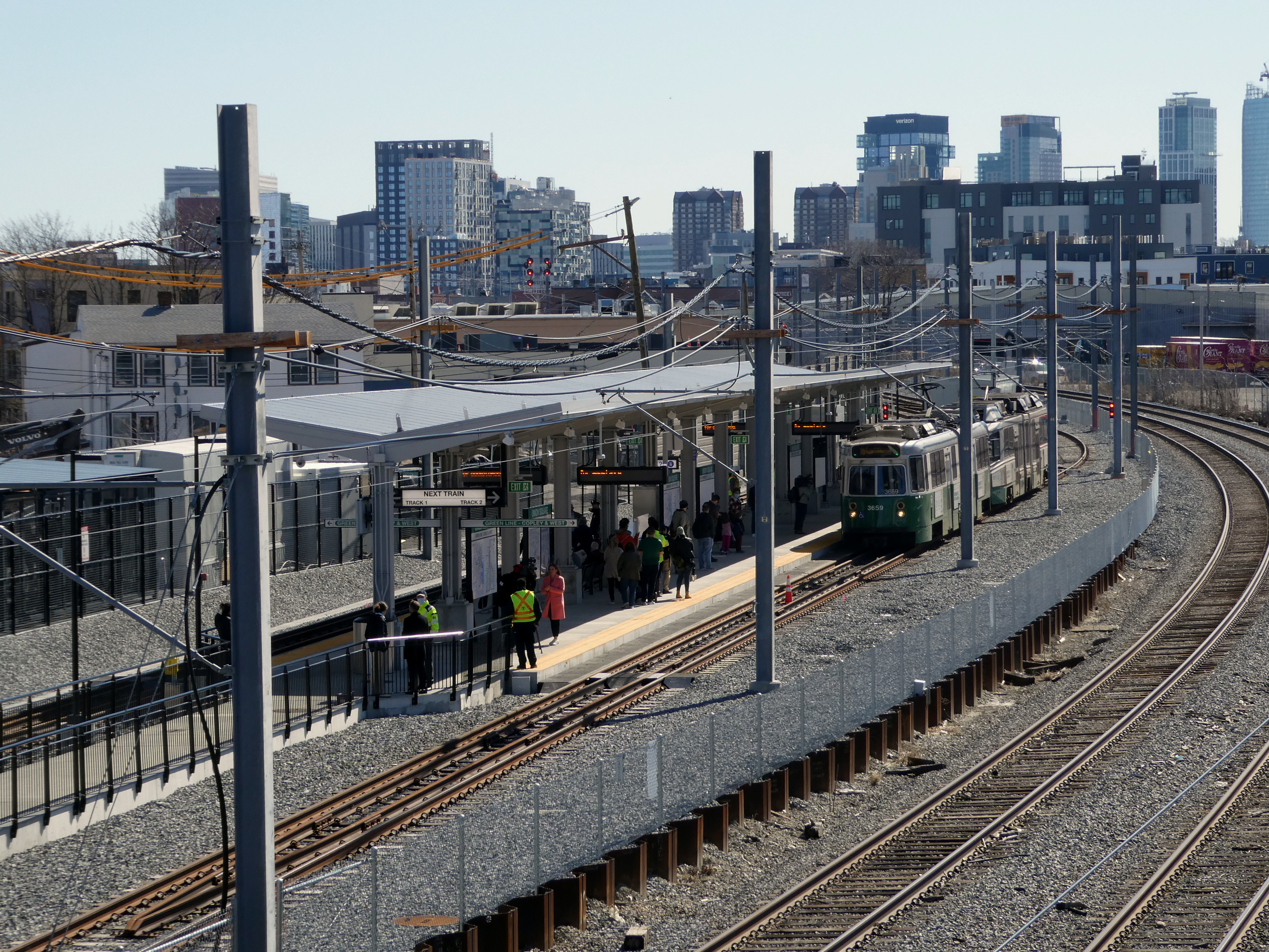
Union Square station on the first day of service in March 2022

Union Square station on the MBTA Green Line, located on Prospect Street south of Union Square, opened on March 21, 2022, as part of the Green Line Extension project. East Somerville station, located on Washington Street east of the square, opened on December 12, 2022. Union Square is also served by MBTA bus routes 85, 87, 91, and 109.
