= George Henry Preble =

American naval officer and writer

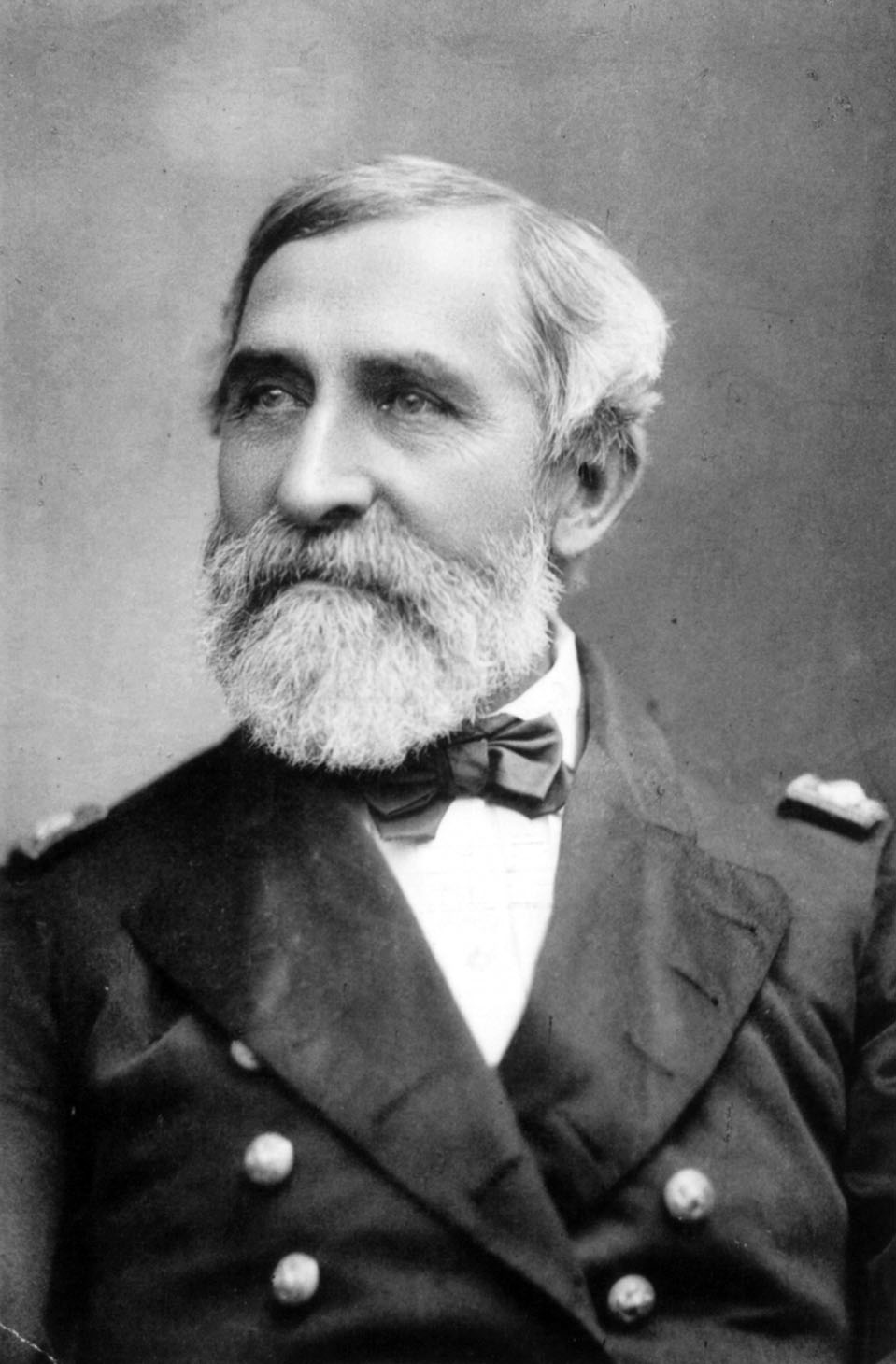
- Born: February 25, 1816; Portland, Maine, U.S.
- Died: March 1, 1885 (aged 69); Brookline, Massachusetts, U.S.
- Burial place: Evergreen Cemetery, Portland, Maine, U.S.
- Relatives: Edward Preble (uncle)
- Military career
- Allegiance: United States
- Branch: United States Navy
- Service years: 1835–78
- Rank: Rear Admiral
- Commands: Katahdin; Oneida; St. Louis; State of Georgia; Pensacola; South Pacific Station
- Conflicts: Second Seminole War; Mexican–American War; American Civil War
- Other work: Writer of historical and genealogical studies

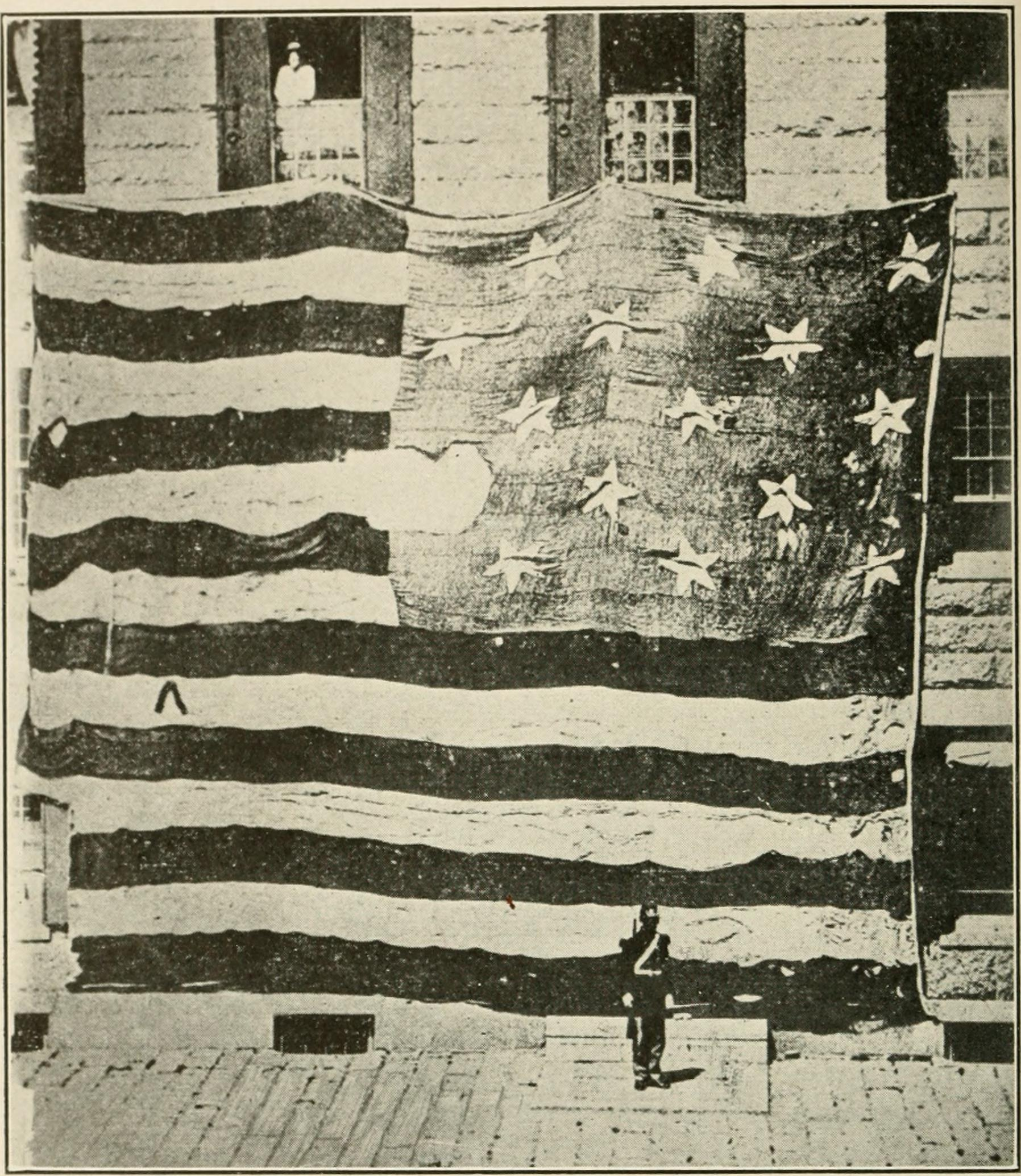
Preble's 1873 photo of the Ft. McHenry flag in the Boston Navy Yard

George Henry Preble (February 25, 1816 – March 1, 1885) was an American naval officer and writer, notable for his history of the flag of the United States and for taking the first photograph of the Fort McHenry flag that inspired the U.S. national anthem, "The Star-Spangled Banner".

== Early life and education ==
He was born in Portland, Maine, into a seafaring family; his father was sea captain Enoch Preble, whose brother was the noted Commodore Edward Preble. George entered the Navy as a midshipman on October 10, 1835, serving on the frigate United States until 1838.

== Career ==
He was in the Florida war in 1841, and was on the sloop St. Louis for its circumnavigation of the world in 1843–1845, taking ashore the first American force to land in China. In the Mexican–American War, he participated in the capture of Alvarado, Veracruz, and Tuxpan. He became master on July 15, 1847, and lieutenant on February 5, 1848. While serving on the frigate St. Lawrence, he went with Matthew C. Perry to Japan in 1853, during which Preble surveyed various harbors in the Far East.

After a period as lighthouse inspector and at Charlestown Navy Yard, he served on Narragansett, 1859–1861, then took command of the steam-gunboat Katahdin, serving with David Farragut on the Mississippi River, was promoted to commander on July 16, 1862, and given command of the steam-sloop Oneida blockading Mobile Bay.

After the Confederate cruiser CSS Florida ran the blockade into Mobile Bay on September 4, 1862, Preble was dismissed from the Navy. On February 12, 1863, President Abraham Lincoln nominated him for restoration.

In 1872, a formal court of inquiry concluded that Preble's failure to stop Florida was a “venial violation of duty” and that, once the vessel's intention to violate the blockade became apparent, he did all that a loyal, brave, and efficient officer could do to capture or destroy her.

In written statements collected by Preble after his dismissal, officers aboard Oneida generally supported his account, describing the ship's prompt preparation for action and his energetic pursuit of Florida. According to their accounts, Florida appeared at around 5:00 pm on September 4, 1862, bearing the ensign of a ship of the English Navy. Preble commanded Oneida and served as the senior officer of the blockading force off Mobile; Commander James S. Thornton commanded Winona. On September 4, the vessels available to oppose Florida were Oneida, Winona, and the mortar schooner Rachel Seaman; several other vessels assigned to the blockade were absent for repairs, coal, or duty elsewhere. Winona had been dispatched to chase another blockade runner and was returning from that chase when Florida began her run. One of Oneida’s two boilers had been shut down to repair a leaking tube, limiting the ship’s speed during the chase. Still believing the approaching vessel to be British, Preble hailed her and, after receiving no reply, ordered three warning shots in quick succession. When she continued toward the harbor, he ordered a fourth shot directed at the vessel. Oneida and Winona then maintained fire during the pursuit, while Rachel Seaman opened fire when Florida came within range. Despite sustaining substantial damage, Florida reached Mobile Bay and passed under the protection of Fort Morgan.

After his restoration, Preble commanded the sailing sloop St. Louis while searching the eastern Atlantic for Confederate cruisers. He encountered Florida while she was attempting to obtain coal and supplies at Madeira, but the faster Confederate vessel departed while St. Louis was becalmed.

=== Writing career ===
Preble was a writer on naval and historical subjects and a collector of naval documents. The Navy Department Library holds the George Henry Preble Collection, which includes books, pamphlets, manuscripts, correspondence, photographs, and other materials assembled by him. at the Navy Department Library. He was also active in various learned and genealogical societies of the time. In 1868, he published a genealogical history of the Preble family in North America, which included his biography and portrait, as well as that of his famous uncle, Edward The book also set forth a defense of his actions that led to his dismissal from the Navy, as well as the efforts of himself and others that led to his exoneration and reinstatement. In 1872, he published his Our Flag: Origin and Progress of the Flag of the United States of America, which is still cited as a source. He also took care of the original "Star-Spangled Banner" which had flown over Fort McHenry and had the flag sewn to a piece of sailcloth in order to preserve it.

== Later life and death ==
After the war, Preble commanded the steamer State of Georgia, and rescued 600 passengers from the wrecked steamer Golden Rule. He was at the Boston Navy Yard from 1865 to 1868, where he was promoted to captain on March 16, 1867, then commanded the screw steamer Pensacola until 1870. He became commodore on November 2, 1871, commanding the Philadelphia Navy Yard from 1873 to 1875. Preble became rear admiral on September 30, 1876, commanding the South Pacific Station from 1877 to 1878. He retired from active duty on February 25, 1878.

He was a member of the Military Order of the Loyal Legion of the United States.

In 1873 Preble was elected a member of the American Antiquarian Society

Preble died while living at the home of his son in Brookline, Massachusetts near Boston, on March 1, 1885. He is buried in Evergreen Cemetery in Portland, Maine.

== Dates of rank ==
- Midshipman - 10 October 1835
- Passed Midshipman - 22 June 1841
- Master - 15 July 1847
- Lieutenant - 5 February 1848
- Commander - 16 July 1862
- Captain - 29 January 1867
- Commodore - 2 November 1871
- Rear Admiral - 30 September 1876
- Retired List - 25 February 1878

== Publications ==
- Chase of the Rebel Steamer of War "Oreto" (Cambridge, 1862)
- A genealogical Sketch of the First Three Generations of Prebles in America (Boston, 1868)
- First Cruise of the United States Frigate "Essex" (Salem, 1870)
- Our Flag: Origin and Progress of the Flag of the United States of America (Albany, 1872)
- History of Steam Navigation (Philadelphia, 1883)
- History of the Flag of the United States of America (1880)
