= Prospect Hill Monument =

Stone structure in Somerville, Massachusetts, USA

Coordinates: 42°22′54″N 71°05′37″W

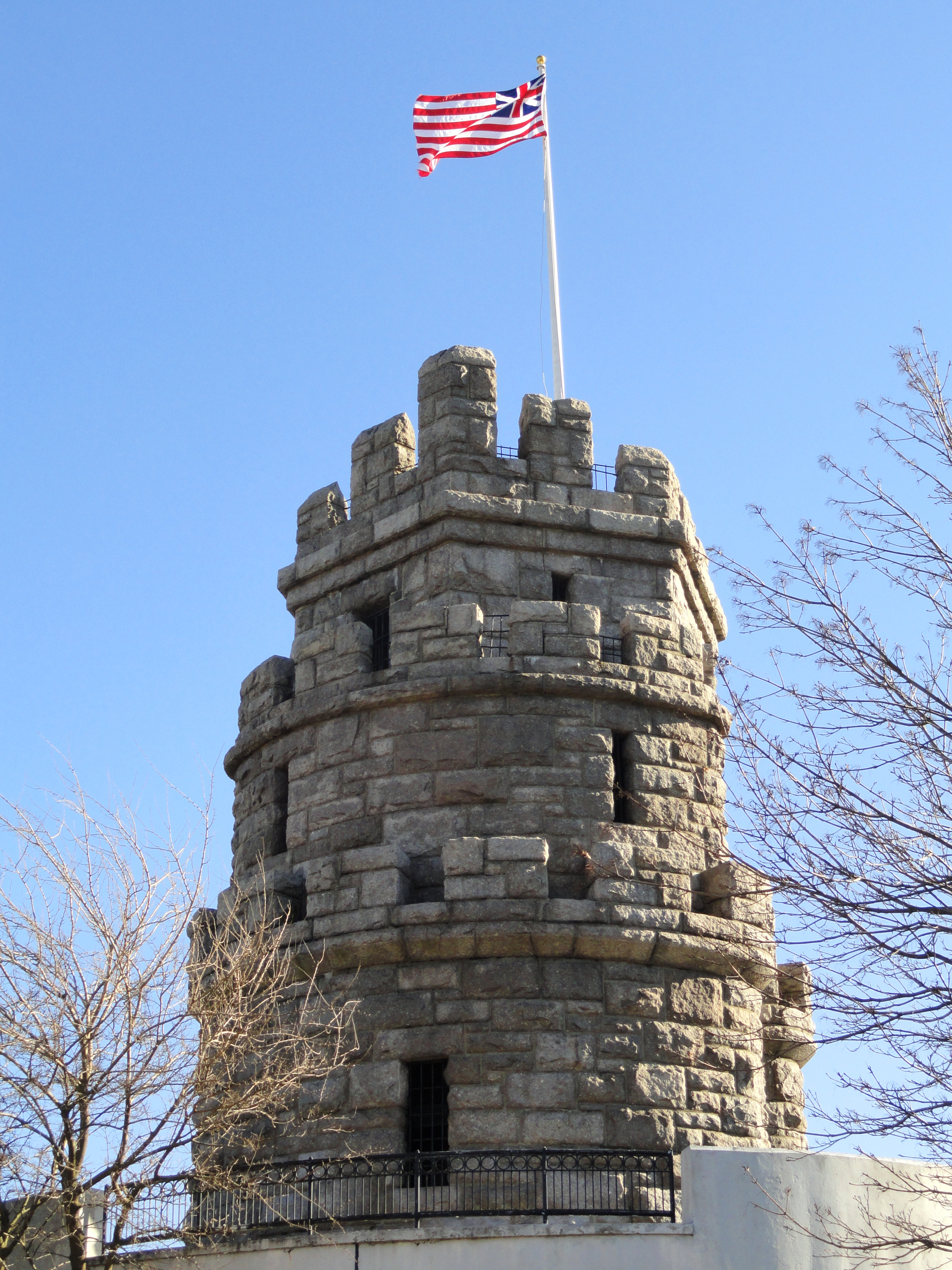
Prospect Hill Monument bearing the Continental Union Flag, 2012

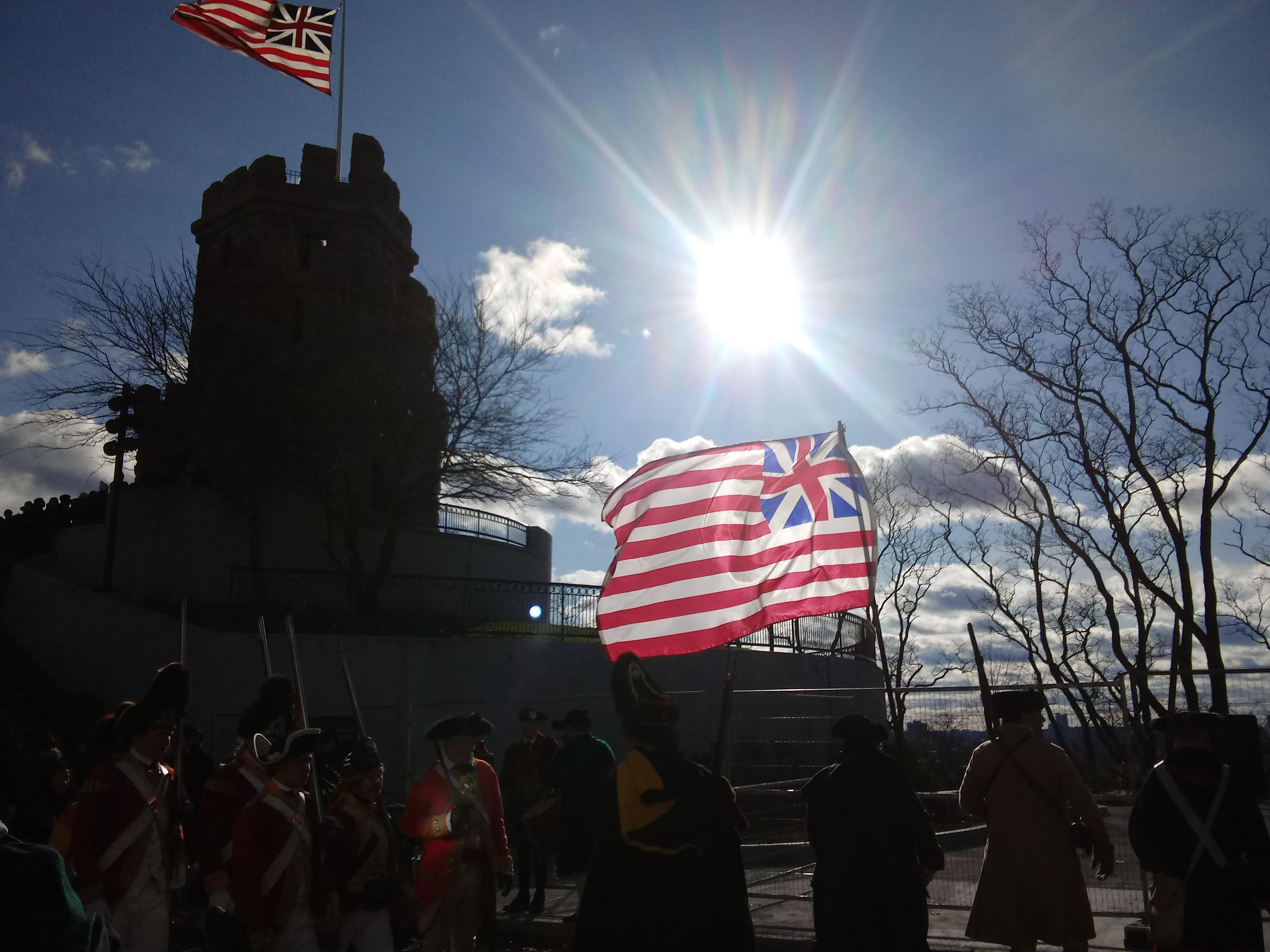
Grand Union Prospect Hill

The Prospect Hill Monument, also occasionally called the Prospect Hill Tower is a stone structure in Somerville, Massachusetts. It is a block away from the heart of Union Square, a neighborhood in Somerville. Its name is formally the Prospect Hill Memorial Flag Tower and Observatory.

The tower is four stories tall and built out of iron and stone. The lower deck, outside of the first floor is open to the public and offers a panoramic view of Boston, Somerville, and Cambridge. The city of Somerville has offered tours of the tower.

There is a tradition of annual flag-raising ceremonies involving American Revolutionary War reenactors that are held at Prospect Hill on New Year's Day.

== History ==
Prospect Hill was the location of George Washington's command post and rebel fortifications during the Siege of Boston in the American Revolution. It also served as a training facility during the American Civil War. The tower monument was built in 1903. The plaque states that:

From this aminence on January 1, 1776 The flag of the United Colonies Bearing thirteen stripes and the crosses of Saint George and Saint Andrew First waved defiance to a foe.

=== Flag exhibit ===
The monument flies the Continental Union Flag, the first American flag. On New Year's Day in 1776, Washington conducted a flag-raising ceremony to raise the morale of the men of the Continental Army. The standard account features the Continental Union Flag, although in 2006, Peter Ansoff advanced a theory that it was actually a British Union flag instead. Others, such as Byron DeLear, have argued in favour of the traditional version of events.

== Bibliography ==
- Ansoff, Peter (2006). "The Flag on Prospect Hill". Raven: A Journal of Vexillology. 13: 77–100. doi:10.5840/raven2006134. ISSN 1071-0043.
- DeLear, Byron (2018). The First American Flag: Revisiting the Grand Union at Prospect Hill. Talbot Publishers. ISBN 978-1-94-683102-6.
- DeLear, Byron (2014). "Revisiting the Flag at Prospect Hill: Grand Union or Just British?" (PDF). Raven: A Journal of Vexillology. 21: 19–70. doi:10.5840/raven2014213.
- Orchard, Chris (30 December 2013). "Research upholds traditional Prospect Hill flag story". Patch Media. New York.
