= Cliff House =

Cliff House may refer to:

== Canada ==
- Cliff House, Edmonton, Alberta, Edmonton's smallest laneway house

== England ==
- Cliff House, Ipswich, Suffolk, home of Thomas Cobbold (1708–1767)
- Cliff House, Marske-by-the-Sea, North Yorkshire, summer residence of Joseph Pease (1799–1872)

== India ==
- Cliff House (Kerala), the official residence of the Chief Minister of Kerala

== United States ==
- Cliff House (San Francisco, California), historic name of a series of landmarks on the same site that have housed a variety of restaurants by different names
- Cliff House (Manitou Springs, Colorado), listed on the NRHP in El Paso County, Colorado
- Cliff Cottage, Southbridge, Massachusetts, listed on the NRHP in Massachusetts
- Z. E. Cliff House, Somerville, Massachusetts, listed on the NRHP in Massachusetts
