= List of mayors of Somerville, Massachusetts =

Mayor of Somerville
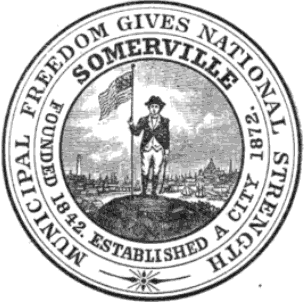
- Former City Seal (1872–1972) depicting George Washington

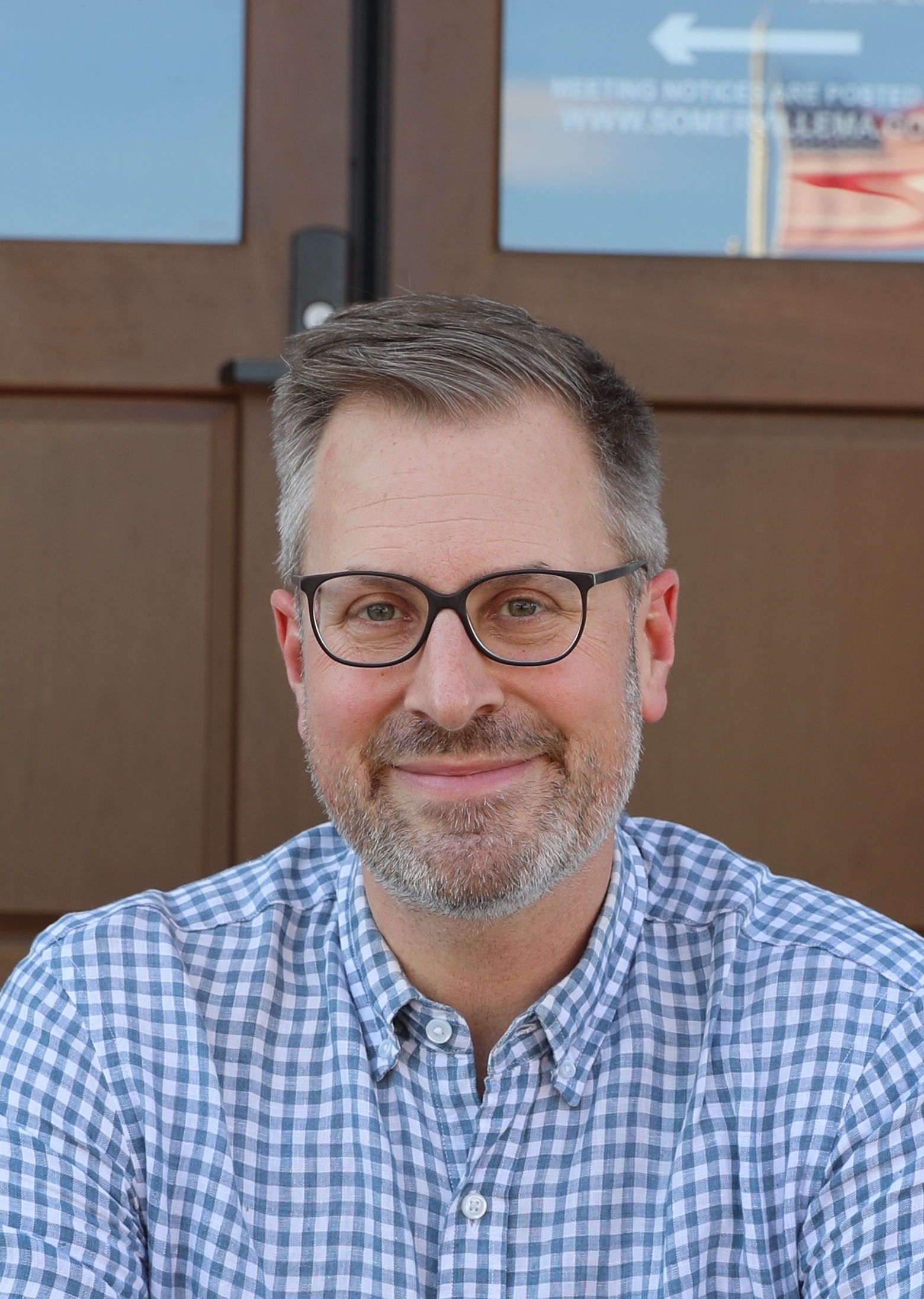
- Incumbent; Jake Wilson since January 2, 2026
- Seat: Somerville City Hall
- Term length: Two years
- Formation: 1872
- First holder: George O. Brastow
- Website: www.somervillema.gov/mayor

From 1841 until 1872 Somerville was run by the Board of Selectmen, because up to that point Somerville was still incorporated as a town. The Mayor is the current head of the municipal government in Somerville, Massachusetts.

== Mayors of Somerville, Massachusetts ==
#	Mayor	Picture	Term	Party
1st	George O. Brastow		January 1, 1872 – January 5, 1874	
2nd	William Henry Furber		January 5, 1874 – January 3, 1876	
3rd	Austin Belknap		January 3, 1876 – January 1878	
4th	George A. Bruce		January 1878 – 1880	Republican
5th	John Adams Cummings		1881–1884	
6th	Mark F. Burns		1885–1888	Republican
7th	Charles G. Pope		1889–1891	Republican
8th	William H. Hodgkins		1892 – January 6, 1896	Republican
9th	Albion A. Perry		January 6, 1896 – 1898	Citizens and Republican
10th	George O. Proctor		1899–1900	Republican
11th	Edward Glines		January, 1901 – January 4, 1904	Republican
12th	Leonard B. Chandler		January 4, 1904 – January 1, 1906	Republican
13th	Charles Arnold Grimmons		January 1, 1906 – January 4, 1909	Republican
14th	John M. Woods		January 4, 1909 – January 2, 1911	Republican
15th	Charles A. Burns		January 2, 1911 – January 5, 1914	Republican
16th	Zebedee E. Cliff		January 5, 1914 – January 7, 1918	Republican
17th	Charles W. Eldridge		January 7, 1918 – January 1922	Republican
18th	John M. Webster		January 1922 – January 4, 1926	Republican
19th	Leon Martin Conwell		January 4, 1926 – January 6, 1930	Republican
20th	John J. Murphy		January 6, 1930 – January 1, 1934	Democratic
21st	James E. Hagan		January 1, 1934 – January 6, 1936	Democratic
22nd	Leslie E. Knox		January 6, 1936 – January 3, 1938	Republican
23rd	John M. Lynch		January 3, 1938 – January 1943	Democratic
24th	G. Edward Bradley		January 1943 – January 1950	Democratic
25th	John M. Lynch		January 1950 – January 1954	Democratic
26th	William J. Donovan		January 1954 – November 24, 1959	
(Acting)	Paul M. Haley		November 24, 1959 – January 1960	
27th	Harold W. Wells		January 1960 – January 1, 1962	Democratic
28th	Lawrence F. Bretta		January 1, 1962 – July 17, 1967	Democratic
(Acting)	John R. Havican		July 17, 1967 – January 1968	
29th	James F. Brennan		January 1968 – January 1970	
30th	S. Lester Ralph		January 1970 – January 1978	Democratic
31st	Thomas F. August		January 1978 – January 1980	
32nd	Eugene C. Brune		January 1980 – January 1990	Democratic
33rd	Michael Capuano		January 1, 1990 – January 5, 1999	Democratic
(Acting)	William M. Roche		January 5, 1999 – May 20, 1999	
34th	Dorothy Kelly Gay		May 21, 1999 – January 5, 2004	Democratic
35th	Joseph Curtatone		January 5, 2004 — January 3, 2022	Democratic
36th	Katjana Ballantyne		January 3, 2022 — January 2, 2026	Democratic
37th	Jake Wilson		January 2, 2026 — present	

== See also ==
- Timeline of Somerville, Massachusetts
