= Somerville City Hall =

- Somerville High School
- U.S. National Register of Historic Places
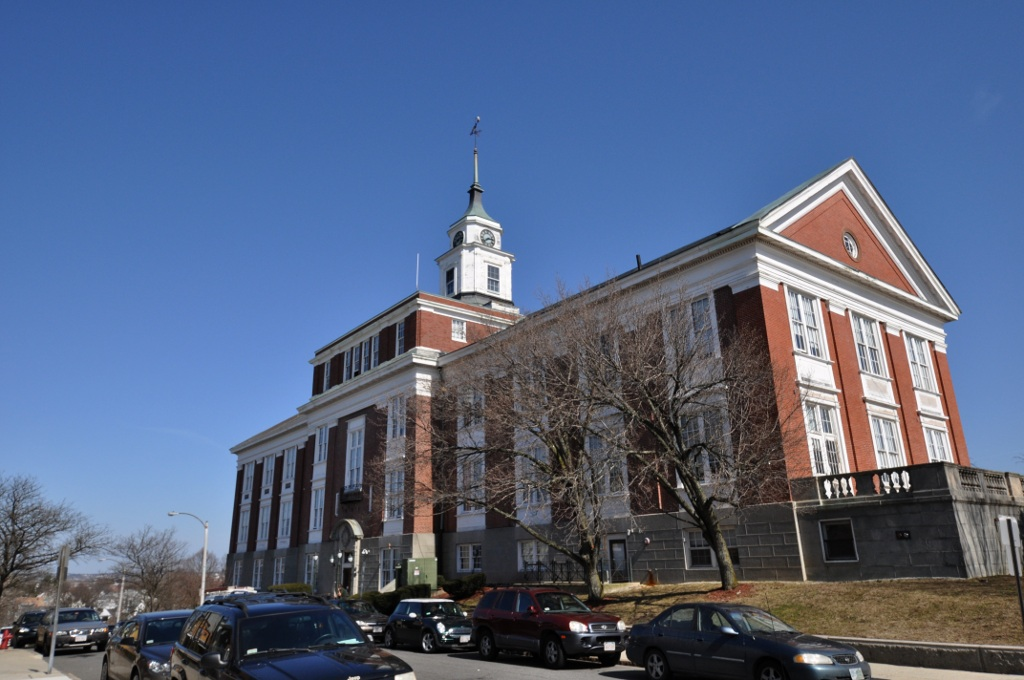

- Location within Massachusetts Location within the United States
- Location: 93 Highland Ave., Somerville, Massachusetts
- Coordinates: 42°23′13.92″N 71°5′53.48″W
- Area: less than one acre
- Built: 1851-52; 1896-97; 1923-24
- Built by: J. S. & I. W. Tuttle (1851-52); Alfred H. Hines (1896-97); Unknown (1923-24)
- Architect: Melvin & Young (1851-52); Thomas M. Sargent (1896-97); Ritchie, Parsons & Taylor (1923-24)
- Architectural style: Colonial Revival, Other, Georgian Revival
- MPS: Somerville MPS
- NRHP reference No.: 89001261
- Added to NRHP: September 18, 1989

The Somerville City Hall (which formerly served as Somerville High School) is a historic municipal building at 93 Highland Avenue in Somerville, Massachusetts. Built in 1852 and enlarged several times, it has served as the city's first high school, first public library, and only city hall. The building was added to the National Register of Historic Places in 1989.

== Description ==
Somerville City Hall is located at the northeast corner of School Street and Highland Avenue at the western end of the Central Hill area of the city, a cluster of municipal buildings that includes the current Somerville High School and its Central Library. The present appearance of the building is as a 2-1/2 story brick Colonial Revival structure, with a gable roof and a projecting square section at the center of its east-facing front facade. The building is topped by a wood-frame belfry and clocktower with cupola.

== History ==
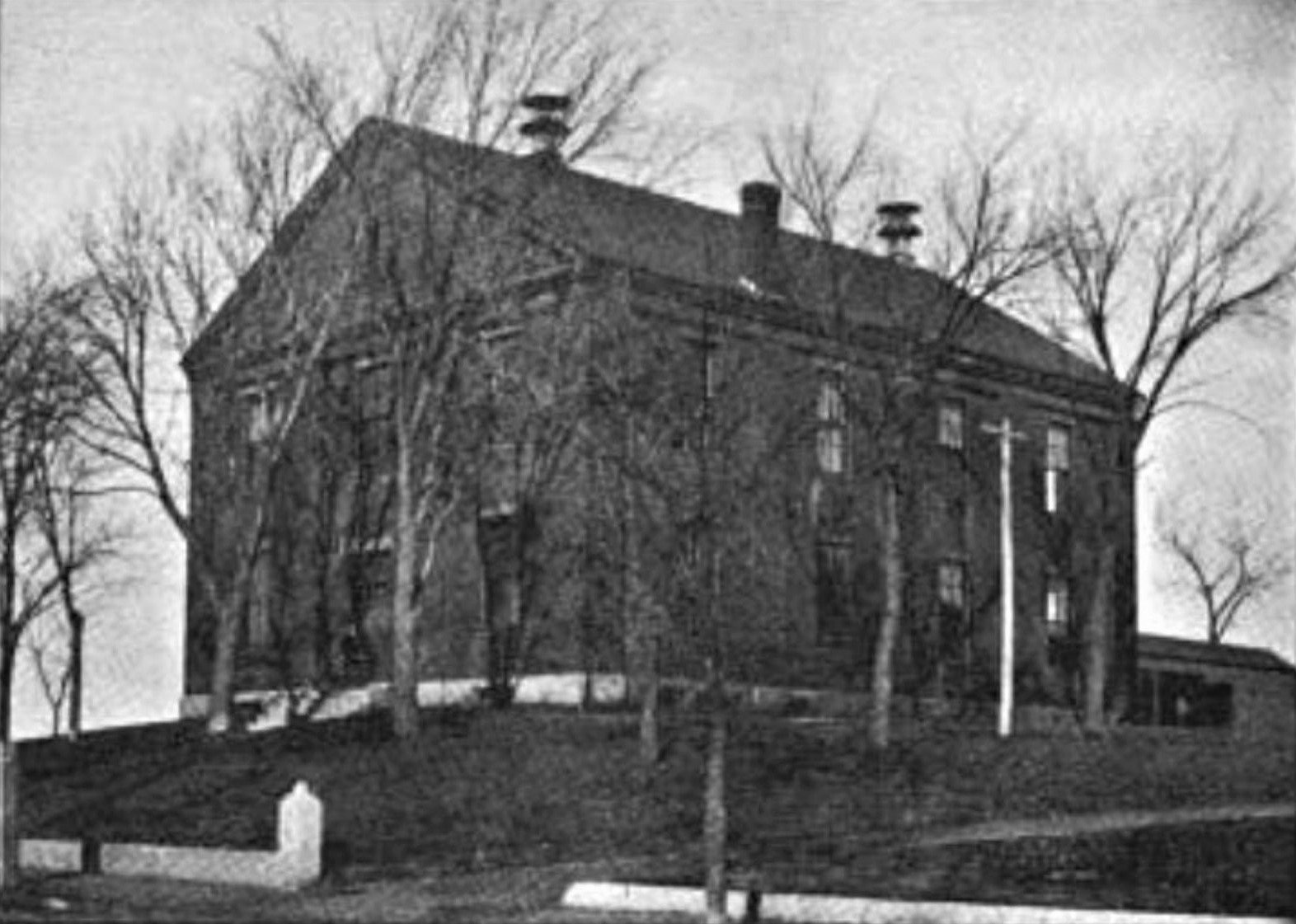
Somerville City Hall in 1892, prior to later alterations.

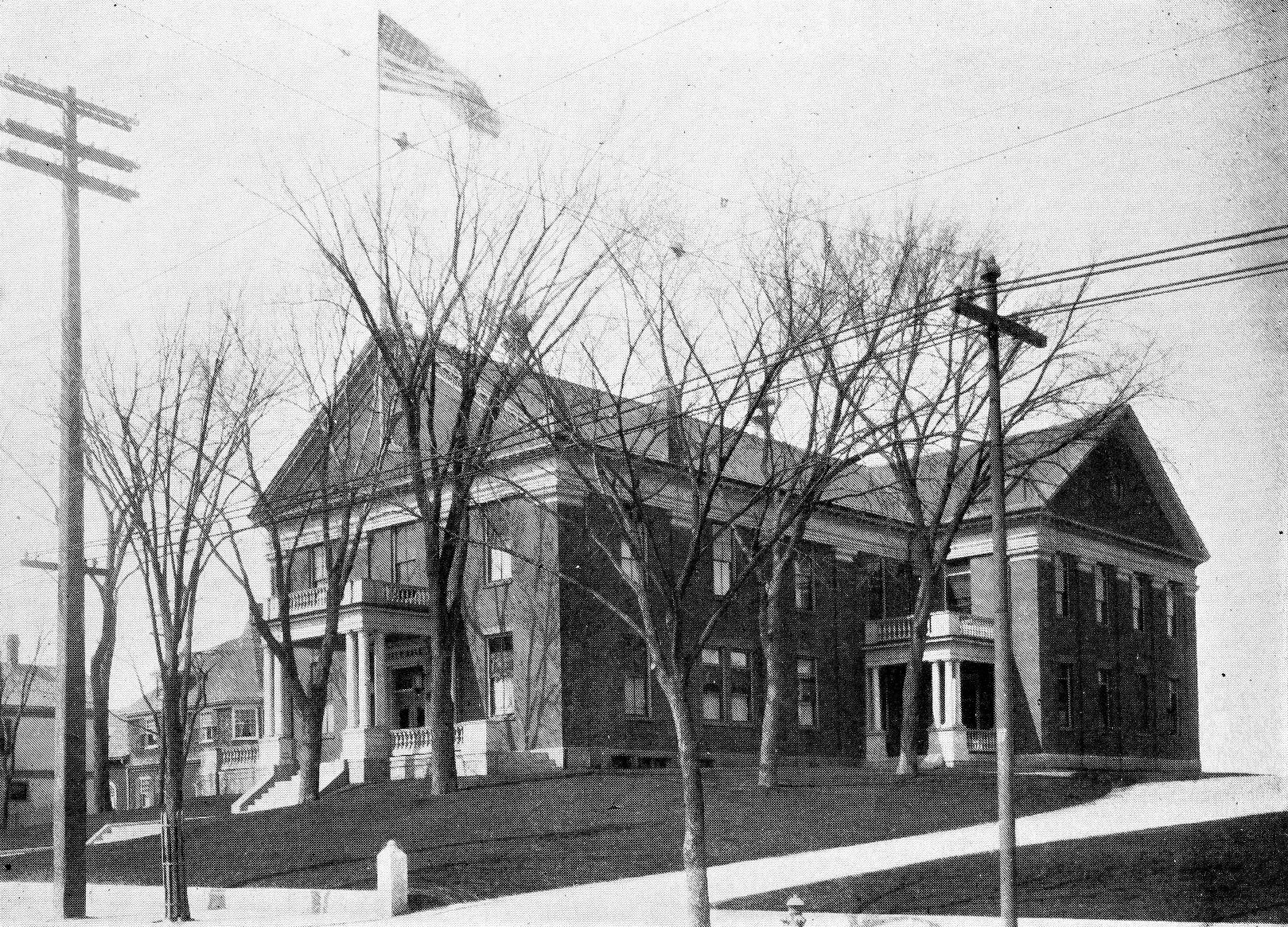
Somerville City Hall in 1912, following the alterations of 1896 and 1902.

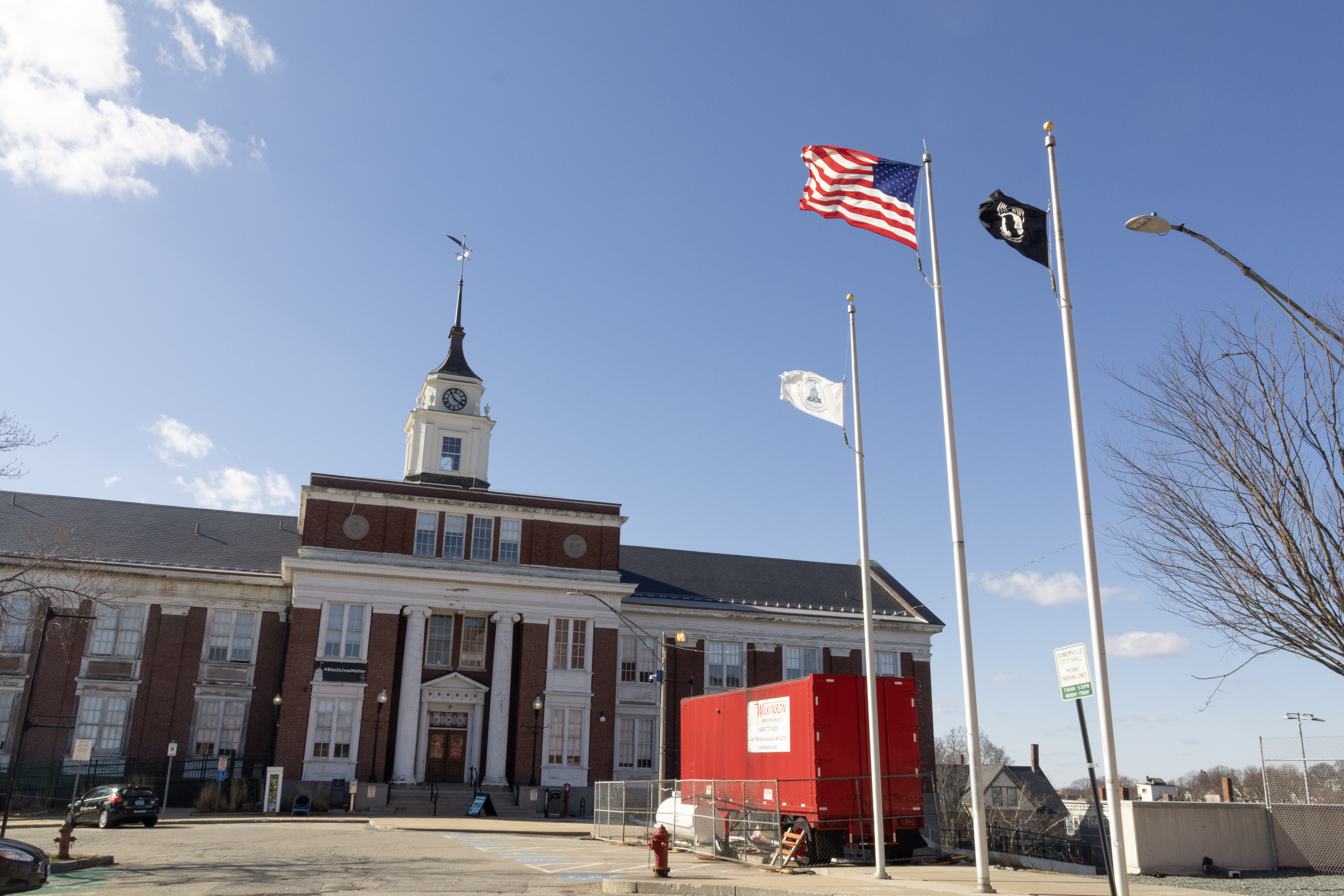
Somerville City Hall in 2026

It was decided to build the building in 1851. Melvin & Young of Boston were the architects, and James S. Tuttle and Isaiah W. Tuttle of Somerville were the builders. When it was completed in 1852, the brick Greek Revival building housed the Free High School on the second floor, and a large meeting hall, called Town Hall, on the first. Rapid expansion of the town during the next fifteen years created cramped conditions for the High School, and in 1866 it was voted that the school would take over the entire building. Almost simultaneously, the Forster School on Sycamore Street was destroyed by fire. It was decided that the new Forster School would include a large hall, called Forster Hall, on its third floor to replace Town Hall. This was completed in 1867, and the High School moved into the vacant space. This too was quickly outgrown, and a new Somerville High School was built in 1871, and dedicated in 1872. Also in 1871, the Massachusetts legislature reincorporated Somerville as a city, which was approved by the voters, which was to take effect on January 1, 1872. Once the new High School was dedicated, the old building was converted into the Somerville City Hall. Continued growth of the city necessitated more changes in the building, with the police department and public library moving into their own buildings in 1875 and 1885, respectively.

In 1893, 1894 and 1895, then-mayor William H. Hodgkins agitated for a new City Hall. This was however rejected by his successor, Albion A. Perry, who advocated instead for an extension to the building. Thomas M. Sargent, a Boston architect and Somerville resident, was commissioned to do the work. A large addition was built on the rear of the building. The original brick cornice was removed at this time, and replaced with a Tuscan order entablature. Additional alterations, including the addition of a front porch and terrace, were carried out in 1902. The architect of this work was Walter T. Littlefield, assistant commissioner of public buildings, and built by George F. Matthews. The building was extended one last time in 1923-24. This work also overhauled the entire of the existing building. A new wing was built on the north side, and the main entrance moved to Sargent's east facade, where a two Ionic columns in antis were inserted. A secondary entrance was added on the west facade, facing School Street. Sargent's 1896 wing was further extended with a full third floor, topped by a cupola with a clock made by the E. Howard Clock Company. The interior was remodeled as well, and changes included a new chamber for the Board of Aldermen (now City Council), main lobby and grand stair. Much of the building's Greek Revival origins were erased at this time, with only the shape of the original wing and the brick pilasters remaining. The architects for this work were Ritchie, Parsons & Taylor of Boston.

Following the completion of the Somerville High School project, it has been proposed to renovate the building again.

== See also ==
- National Register of Historic Places listings in Somerville, Massachusetts
