= Senator Blanchard (disambiguation) =

Newton C. Blanchard (1849–1922) was a U.S. Senator from Louisiana from 1894 to 1897. Senator Blanchard may also refer to:

- Charles V. Blanchard (1866–1939), Massachusetts State Senate
- George W. Blanchard (1884–1964), Wisconsin State Senate
