= Mark F. Burns =

American politician

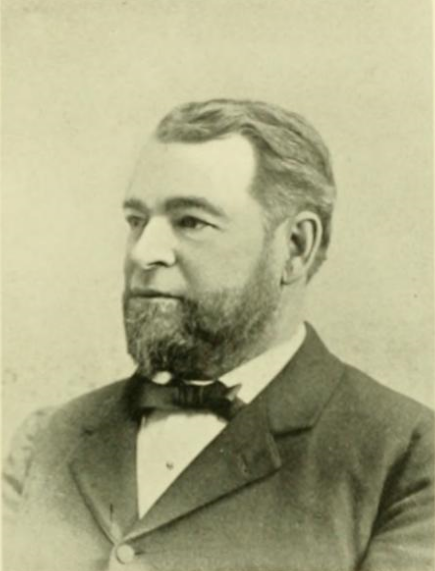

6th Mayor of Somerville, Massachusetts
- In office 1885–1888
- Preceded by: John A. Cummings
- Succeeded by: Charles G. Pope

Trustee of the Somerville, Massachusetts Public Library
- In office 1884–1884

Member of the Somerville, Massachusetts Board of Aldermen Ward 1
- In office 1882–1883

President of the Somerville, Massachusetts Common Council
- In office 1881–1881
- Preceded by: Joseph Warren Bailey
- Succeeded by: Albion A. Perry

Member of the Somerville, Massachusetts Common Council Ward 1
- In office 1880–1881

Personal details
- Born: May 24, 1841 Milford, New Hampshire
- Died: January 16, 1898 Winchester, Massachusetts
- Party: Republican
- Spouse(s): Elvira Bowers d. January 13, 1885.; Sarah A. Miles, m. April 27, 1892
- Children: Samuel A. Burns; Robert Burns, b. March 1, 1869, d. April 4, 1923; Maud; Paul S. Burns.

Mark F. Burns (May 24, 1841 – January 16, 1898) was an American politician who served on the Board of Aldermen, as a member and President of the Common Council, and as the sixth Mayor of Somerville, Massachusetts.

== Notes ==
Political offices
Preceded by John A. Cummings	6th Mayor of Somerville, Massachusetts; 1885–1888	Succeeded by Charles G. Pope
Preceded by Joseph Warren Bailey	President of the Somerville, Massachusetts, Common Council; 1881-1881	Succeeded by Albion A. Perry
