= Electoral history of Ed Markey =

Elections featuring American politician

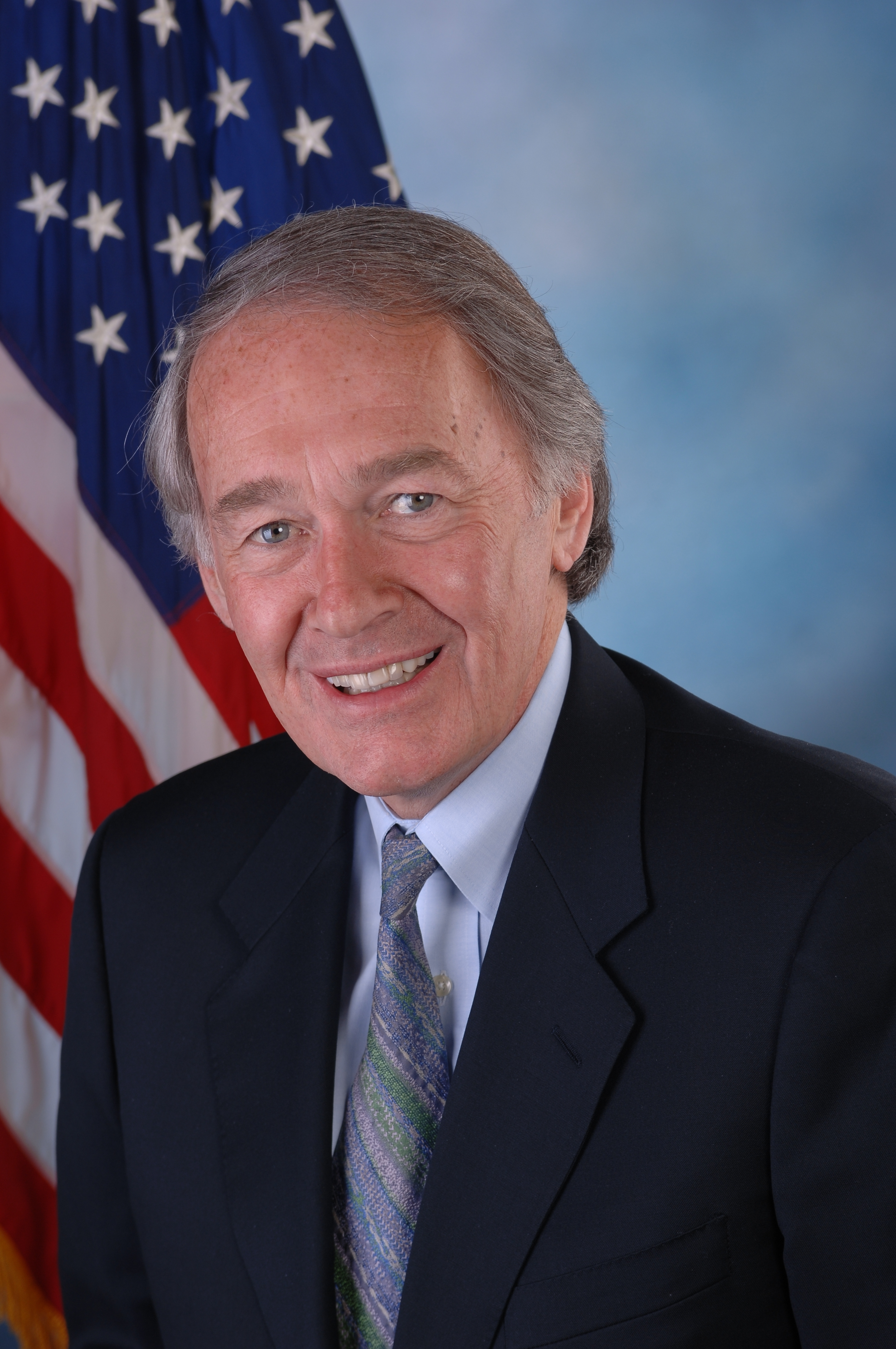
Representative Ed Markey, 2011

This is the electoral history of Ed Markey, a Democratic Senator from Massachusetts. He was previously a Democratic Representative from Massachusetts, representing the 7th and 5th districts. Markey was first elected in a 1976 special election to replace the deceased Torbert Macdonald, and was re-elected in every subsequent election. He was also the Democratic candidate, and winner, of the 2013 special election, for the United States Senate.

== Massachusetts House of Representatives ==
Massachusetts House of Representatives District 81 Democratic Primary election, 1974
Party	Candidate	Votes	%	+%
Democratic	Edward Markey	2,433	40.5%	
Democratic	John McNeil	1,946	32.4%	
Democratic	John Brennan, Jr.	1,623	27.0%	

Massachusetts House of Representatives District 81 election, 1974
Party	Candidate	Votes	%	+%
Democratic	Edward Markey	5,810	81.6%	
Independent	Vernon Newman	1,308	18.4%	

== United States House of Representatives ==
Massachusetts 7th Congressional District Democratic Primary special election, 1976
Party	Candidate	Votes	%	+%
Democratic	Edward Markey	22,137	21.6%	
Democratic	Joseph Croken	16,298	15.9%	
Democratic	Vincent LoPresti	13,787	13.4%	
Democratic	Stephen McGrail	13,757	13.4%	
Democratic	George McCarthy	12,838	12.5%	
Democratic	William Reinstien	5,989	5.8%	
Democratic	William Hogan	5,143	5.0%	
Democratic	Robert Donovan	5,083	5.0%	
Democratic	Jack Left	4,266	4.2%	
Democratic	Robert Leo	1,759	1.7%	
Democratic	Rose Marie Turino	852	0.8%	
Democratic	Bartholomew Conte	756	0.7%	

Massachusetts 7th Congressional District Democratic Primary election, 1980
Party	Candidate	Votes	%	+%
Democratic	Edward Markey (inc.)	29,190	84.8%	
Democratic	James Murphy	5,247	15.2%	

Massachusetts 7th Congressional District Democratic Primary election, 1984
Party	Candidate	Votes	%	+%
Democratic	Edward Markey (inc.)	55,248	53.9%	
Democratic	Samuel Rotondi	41,507	40.5%	
Democratic	Philip Doherty	2,873	2.8%	
Democratic	Michael Barrett	2,396	2.3%	
Democratic	Michael Gelber	387	0.4%	

Massachusetts 7th Congressional District Democratic Primary election, 2002
Party	Candidate	Votes	%	+%
Democratic	Edward Markey (inc.)	73,014	84.9%	
Democratic	James Hall	12,964	15.1%	

Massachusetts's 7th congressional district: Results 1976–2010
Year	Democrat	Votes	%	Republican	Votes	%	Third Party	Party	Votes	%	Third Party	Party	Votes	%
1976	Edward Markey	162,126	77%	Richard Daly	37,063	18%	James Murphy	Independent	6,851	3%	Harry Chickles	Independent	4,748	2%
1978	Edward Markey (incumbent)	145,615	85%	No candidate			James Murphy	Independent	26,017	15%				
1980	Edward Markey (incumbent)	155,759	100%	No candidate										
1982	Edward Markey (incumbent)	151,305	78%	David Basile	43,063	22%								
1984	Edward Markey (incumbent)	167,211	71%	S. Lester Ralph	66,930	29%								
1986	Edward Markey (incumbent)	124,183	100%	No candidate										
1988	Edward Markey (incumbent)	188,647	100%	No candidate										
1990	Edward Markey (incumbent)	155,380	100%	No candidate										
1992	Edward Markey (incumbent)	174,837	62%	Stephen Sohn	78,262	28%	Robert Antonelli	Independent	28,421	10%				
1994	Edward Markey (incumbent)	146,246	64%	Brad Bailey	80,674	36%								
1996	Edward Markey (incumbent)	177,053	70%	Patricia Long	76,407	30%								
1998	Edward Markey (incumbent)	137,178	71%	Patricia Long	56,977	29%								
2000	Edward Markey (incumbent)	211,543	99%	No candidate			Other		2,814	1%				
2002	Edward Markey (incumbent)	170,968	98%	No candidate			Other		2,206	1%	Daniel Melnechuk	write-in	863	0%
2004	Edward Markey (incumbent)	202,399	74%	Kenneth Chase	60,334	22%	James Hall	Independent	12,139	4%				
2006	Edward Markey (incumbent)	171,902	98%	No candidate			Other		2,889	2%				
2008	Edward Markey (incumbent)	212,304	76%	John Cunningham	81,802	24%								
2010	Edward Markey (incumbent)	145,696	66%	Gerry Dembrowski	73,467	33%								

Massachusetts's 5th congressional district: Results 2012
Year	Democrat	Votes	%	Republican	Votes	%	Third Party	Party	Votes	%
2012	Ed Markey (incumbent)	257,490	75%	Tom Tierney	82,944	24%	Other		675	0%

== United States Senate ==
=== 2013 Special Election ===
United States Senate special election in Massachusetts, 2013 - Democratic Primary
Party	Candidate	Votes	%
Democratic	Ed Markey	309,854	57.4%
Democratic	Stephen Lynch	229,973	42.6%

United States Senate special election in Massachusetts, 2013
Party	Candidate	Votes	%
Democratic	Edward Markey	642,988	54.84%
Republican	Gabriel Gomez	525,080	44.78%
Twelve Visions Party	Richard Heos	4,518	0.39%

=== 2014 ===
2014 United States Senate election in Massachusetts
Party	Candidate	Votes	%
Democratic	Ed Markey (Incumbent)	1,285,736	61.96%
Republican	Brian Herr	789,378	38.04%
Total votes		2,075,114	100%
Democratic hold			

=== 2020 ===
2020 United States Senate election in Massachusetts - Democratic Primary
Party	Candidate	Votes	%
Democratic	Ed Markey (incumbent)	782,694	55.4%
Democratic	Joe Kennedy III	629,359	44.6%
Total votes		1,412,053	100%

2020 United States Senate election in Massachusetts - General Election
Party	Candidate	Votes	%
Democratic	Ed Markey (incumbent)	2,357,809	66.15%
Republican	Kevin O'Connor	1,177,765	33.05%
Independent	Shiva Ayyadurai (write-in)	21,134	0.59%
Write-in		7,428	0.21%
Total votes		3,564,136	100.0%
Democratic hold			

=== 2026 ===
2026 United States Senate election in Massachusetts - Democratic Primary
Party	Candidate	Votes	%
Democratic	Ed Markey (incumbent)		
Democratic	Seth Moulton		
Total votes			
