= Edward Glines =

American politician (1849–1917)

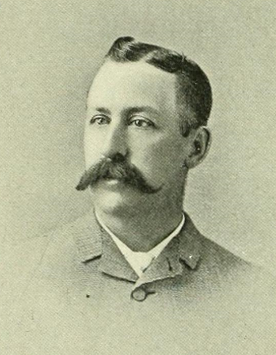

Eleventh Mayor of Somerville, Massachusetts
- In office January, 1901 – January 4, 1904
- Preceded by: George O. Proctor
- Succeeded by: Leonard B. Chandler

Member of the Massachusetts State Senate For the First Middlesex District
- In office 1887–1888
- Preceded by: Eliazer Boynton
- Succeeded by: James F. Dwinell

Member of the Massachusetts House of Representatives For the Sixth Middlesex District
- In office 1882–1883
- Preceded by: Person Davis
- Succeeded by: Joseph Warren Bailey

President of the Somerville, Massachusetts Common Council
- In office 1879–1879

Member of the Somerville, Massachusetts Common Council Ward Three
- In office 1878–1879

Personal details
- Born: August 13 or 31, 1849 Somerville, Massachusetts, U.S.
- Died: March 1, 1917 (aged 67) Somerville, Massachusetts, U.S.
- Party: Republican
- Spouse: Frances C. Hankes

Edward Glines (1849–1917) was a Massachusetts politician who served as the eleventh Mayor of Somerville, Massachusetts.

Glines was a delegate to the 1892 Republican National Convention. Glines was chosen as a Presidential elector in 1892 and he voted for Benjamin Harrison and Whitelaw Reid in the Electoral College.

== See also ==
- 109th Massachusetts General Court (1888)

== Notes ==
Political offices
Preceded by George O. Proctor	Mayor of Somerville, Massachusetts; January, 1901-January 4, 1904	Succeeded by Leonard B. Chandler
