= John M. Woods =

American politician (1839-1927)

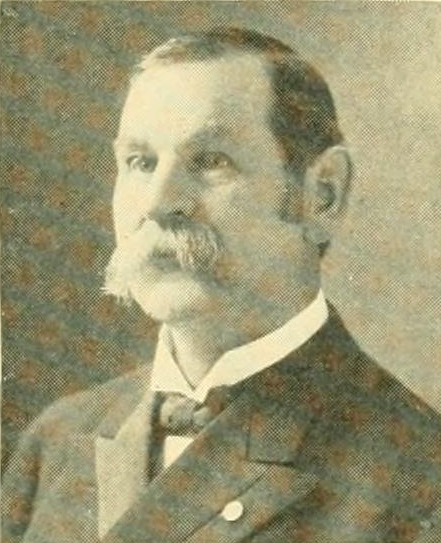

14th Mayor of Somerville, Massachusetts
- In office January 4, 1909 – January 2, 1911
- Preceded by: Charles A. Grimmons
- Succeeded by: Charles A. Burns

Member of the Massachusetts Senate Third Middlesex District
- In office 1904–1906
- Preceded by: Leonard B. Chandler
- Succeeded by: Elmer A. Stevens

Member of the Massachusetts House of Representatives Fifth Middlesex District
- In office January 1884 – January 1885
- Preceded by: Robert L. Spear
- Succeeded by: William H. Flynn

Personal details
- Born: August 18, 1839
- Died: Pelham, New Hampshire, U.S.
- Party: Democratic (until 1892); Republican

Military service
- Allegiance: United States of America; Union
- Branch/service: Union Army
- Years of service: August 18, 1862-June 21, 1865
- Unit: Company I Thirteenth New Hampshire Volunteers *Army of the James and of the Potomac
- Battles/wars: American Civil War *Battle of Fredericksburg

John M. Woods (October 22, 1839 – April 10, 1927) was a Massachusetts businessman and politician who served in both branches of the Massachusetts legislature and as the fourteenth Mayor of Somerville, Massachusetts.

Woods was a delegate to the 1884 Democratic National Convention.

== See also ==
- 126th Massachusetts General Court (1905)

== Notes ==
Political offices
Preceded by Charles A. Grimmons	Mayor of Somerville, Massachusetts; January 4, 1909-January 2, 1911	Succeeded by Charles A. Burns
Preceded by Leonard B. Chandler	Massachusetts State Senator; Third Middlesex District; January 1904-January 1906	Succeeded by Elmer A. Stevens
Preceded by Robert L. Spear	Massachusetts State Representative; Fifth Middlesex District; January 1884-January 1885	Succeeded by William H. Flynn
