= Zebedee E. Cliff =

American politician and architect (1864-1934)

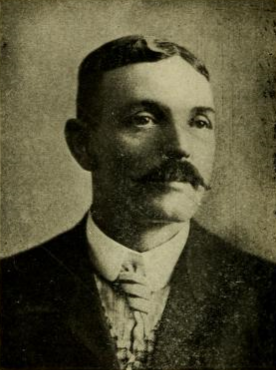

16th Mayor of Somerville, Massachusetts
- In office January 5, 1914 – January 7, 1918
- Preceded by: Charles A. Burns
- Succeeded by: Charles W. Eldridge

Member of the Massachusetts House of Representatives 26th Middlesex District
- In office 1910–1912

Member of the Board of Health of Somerville, Massachusetts
- In office 1907–1909

Member of the Board of Aldermen of Somerville, Massachusetts
- In office 1905–1906

Personal details
- Born: September 23, 1864 Fredericton, New Brunswick
- Died: June 13, 1934 (aged 69) Lexington, Massachusetts, U.S.
- Party: Republican
- Spouse: Ada Cliff
- Profession: Architect and Builder

Zebedee E. Cliff (September 23, 1864 – June 13, 1934) was an American architect, builder and politician who served in the Massachusetts House of Representatives and as the sixteenth Mayor of Somerville, Massachusetts.

== Early life ==
Cliff was born in Fredericton, New Brunswick on September 23, 1864.

== Trivia ==
The four masted schooner Zebedee E. Cliff was named for Cliff.

Cliff's home in Somerville, built circa 1900, was listed on the United States National Register of Historic Places in 1989.
