= Charles A. Burns =

American politician (1863-1930)

Charles Alonzo Burns

Fifteenth Mayor of Somerville, Massachusetts
- In office January 2, 1911 – January 5, 1914
- Preceded by: John M. Woods
- Succeeded by: Zebedee E. Cliff

Member of the Board of Aldermen of Somerville, Massachusetts Ward 5

Personal details
- Born: January 3, 1863 Wilton, New Hampshire, U.S.
- Died: December 31, 1930 (aged 67) Winchester, Massachusetts, U.S.
- Party: Republican
- Spouse(s): Lulie C. Jones, m. October 21, 1885; d., August 25, 1896
- Children: Robert A. Burns; Charles Henry Burns; and Elizabeth Burns
- Education: St Paul's School; Concord, New Hampshire
- Profession: Manufacturer of cotton yarn; quarry operator

Charles Alonzo Burns (January 3, 1863 – December 31, 1930) was a Massachusetts businessman and politician who served on the Board of Aldermen and as the fifteenth mayor of Somerville, Massachusetts.

== Biography ==
Burns was born on January 3, 1863, in Wilton, New Hampshire, to Charles Henry and Sarah Naomi (Mills) Burns.

Burns attended St Paul's School in Concord, New Hampshire, and Chauncey Hall School in Boston, from which he graduated in 1881.

Burns was married to Lulie C. Jones. They had three children: Robert A., Charles Henry and Elizabeth. Lulie Burns died on August 25, 1896.

Burns first entered into the business of manufacturing cotton yarn in Wilton. He later managed soapstone quarries in Chester, Vermont, and in Virginia, and in 1893 moved to Somerville where he worked as the president of the Union Soapstone Co.

In 1927, Burns moved to Winchester, Massachusetts. He died there on December 31, 1930.

== Notes ==
Political offices
Preceded by John M. Woods	15th Mayor of Somerville, Massachusetts; January 2, 1911 – January 5, 1914	Succeeded by Zebedee E. Cliff
