= James F. Brennan (mayor) =

American politician

29th Mayor of Somerville, Massachusetts
- In office January 1968 – January 1970
- Preceded by: John R. Havican (acting)
- Succeeded by: S. Lester Ralph

Personal details
- Born: July 23, 1916
- Died: July 27, 2002 (aged 86) Ireland
- Resting place: Holy Cross Mausoleum, Malden, Massachusetts
- Spouse(s): Ruth L. McAvoy, d. September 8, 2002
- Children: James F. Brennan, Jr.; Thomas M. Brennan

James F. Brennan (July 23, 1916 – July 28, 2002) was a Massachusetts politician who served as the 29th Mayor of Somerville, Massachusetts.

== Notes ==
Political offices
Preceded by Lawrence F. Bretta	29th Mayor of Somerville, Massachusetts; January 1968-January 1970	Succeeded by S. Lester Ralph
