= Thomas F. August =

American politician (1926–2005)

31st Mayor of Somerville
- In office January 1978 – January 1980
- Preceded by: S. Lester Ralph
- Succeeded by: Eugene C. Brune

Member of the Somerville, Massachusetts Board of Aldermen Ward 1

Member of the Somerville, Massachusetts School Committee Ward 1

Personal details
- Born: December 17, 1926 Cambridge, Massachusetts
- Died: March 9, 2005 (aged 78) Salem, Massachusetts
- Resting place: Mount Auburn Cemetery, Cambridge, Massachusetts
- Education: Boston University; Boston University School of Law
- Profession: Lawyer

Military service
- Allegiance: United States of America
- Branch/service: U.S. Navy
- Rank: Chief Pharmacists Mate
- Battles/wars: World War II; Korean War

Thomas F. August (December 17, 1926 – March 9, 2005) was a Massachusetts attorney and politician who served as the 31st mayor of Somerville, Massachusetts. August lost re-election in a three-way race with Eugene C. Brune, who won by 2,400 votes, and Michael E. Capuano, who succeeded Brune.

== Early life ==
August was the son of John and Margaret (Reidy) August.

== Education ==
August was a graduate of Boston University and its Boston University School of Law.

== Military service ==
During World War II and the Korean War, August served as a Chief Pharmacists Mate in the U.S. Navy.

== Death and burial ==
August died on March 9, 2005, in Salem, Massachusetts, and was buried at Mount Auburn Cemetery in Cambridge, Massachusetts.

Political offices
Preceded by S. Lester Ralph	31st Mayor of Somerville, Massachusetts; January 1978 – January 1980	Succeeded by Eugene C. Brune
