= John A. Cummings =

American politician (1838–1887)

John Adams Cummings
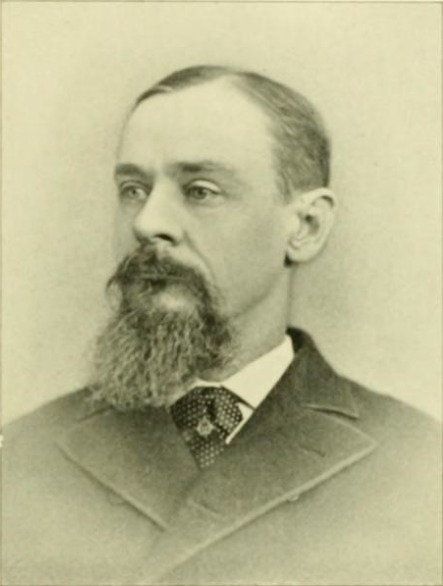

5th Mayor of Somerville, Massachusetts
- In office 1881–1884
- Preceded by: George A. Bruce
- Succeeded by: Mark F. Burns

Member of the Somerville, Massachusetts Board of Aldermen Ward 4
- In office January 1877 – January 1878

Member of the Massachusetts House of Representatives
- In office 1875–1876

Personal details
- Born: January 16, 1838 Nelson, New Hampshire
- Died: January 6, 1887
- Profession: Printer, Newspaper publisher

Military service
- Allegiance: United States of America; Union
- Branch/service: Union Army
- Rank: Lieutenant, Major
- Unit: Sixth New Hampshire Volunteers Army of the Potomac; First New Hampshire Cavalry
- Battles/wars: American Civil War

John Adams Cummings (January 16, 1838 – January 6, 1887) was a Massachusetts politician who served as the fifth Mayor of Somerville, Massachusetts.

From 1872 to 1874 Cummings was the publisher of The Somerville Journal.

== Notes ==
Political offices
Preceded by George A. Bruce	5th Mayor of Somerville, Massachusetts; January 1881–1884	Succeeded by Mark F. Burns
