= William H. Furber =

American politician

William Henry Furber
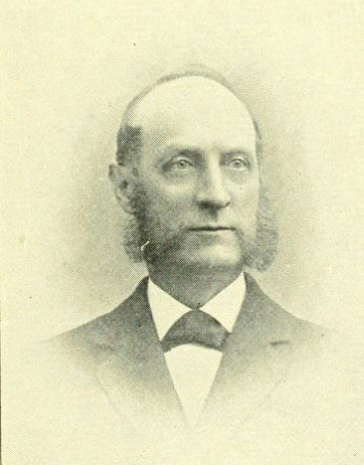

Mayor of Somerville
- In office January 3, 1874 – January 1876
- Preceded by: George O. Brastow
- Succeeded by: Austin Belknap

Member of the Somerville, Massachusetts Board of Aldermen Ward 1
- In office 1872–1873

Personal details
- Born: October 1, 1828 Boston, Massachusetts, US
- Died: April 15, 1912 (aged 83) Newton, Massachusetts, US
- Resting place: Mount Auburn Cemetery
- Occupation: Politician

William Henry Furber (1828–1912) was a Massachusetts politician who served as the second Mayor of Somerville, Massachusetts.

== Biography ==
William Henry Furber was born in Boston on October 1, 1828.

He died at his home in Newton on April 15, 1912, and was buried at Mount Auburn Cemetery.

== Notes ==
Political offices
Preceded by George O. Brastow	2nd Mayor of Somerville, Massachusetts; January 3, 1874 – January 1876	Succeeded by Austin Belknap
