= Charles G. Pope =

American mayor

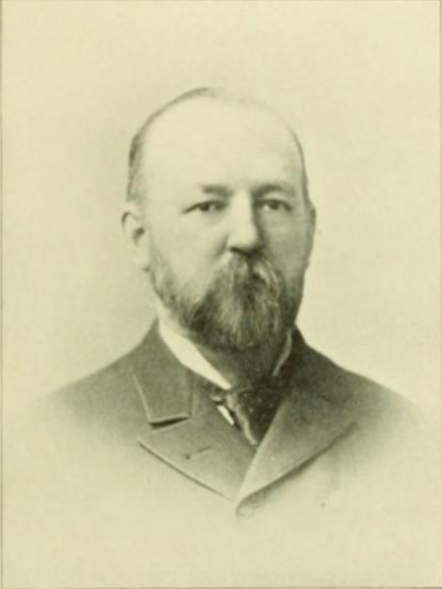

7th Mayor of Somerville, Massachusetts
- In office 1889–1891
- Preceded by: Mark F. Burns
- Succeeded by: William H. Hodgkins

President of the Somerville, Massachusetts Common Council
- In office 1873–1873
- Preceded by: Oren S. Knapp
- Succeeded by: William H. Hodgkins

Member of the Somerville, Massachusetts Common Council Ward 1
- In office 1872–1873

Personal details
- Died: April 24, 1893 Somerville, Massachusetts
- Party: Republican
- Profession: Teacher, lawyer and politician

Charles G. Pope was an American teacher, lawyer and politician who served as a member and President of the Somerville, Massachusetts Common Council and as the seventh Mayor of Somerville, Massachusetts.

== Notes ==
Political offices
Preceded by Mark F. Burns	8th Mayor of Somerville, Massachusetts; 1889–1891	Succeeded by William H. Hodgkins
Preceded by Oren S. Knapp	President of the Somerville, Massachusetts, Common Council; 1873-1873	Succeeded by William H. Hodgkins
