= Gen. Samuel Chandler House =

Historic house in Massachusetts, United States

- U.S. National Register of Historic Places
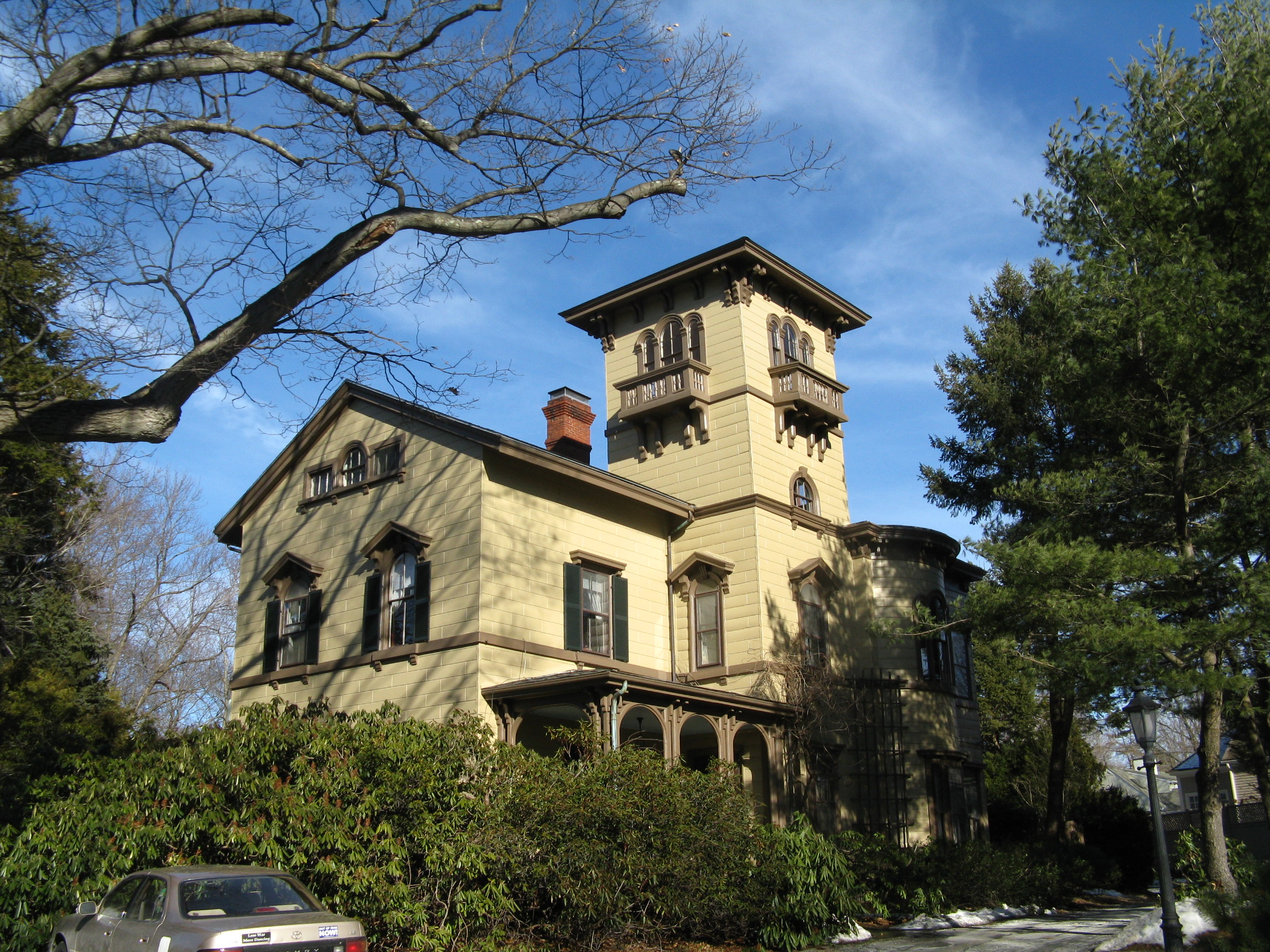
- General Samuel Chandler House

- Location within Massachusetts Location within the United States
- Location: Lexington, Massachusetts
- Coordinates: 42°27′4″N 71°13′45″W
- Built: 1846
- Architect: Isaac Melvin
- Architectural style: Italian Villa
- NRHP reference No.: 77000176
- Added to NRHP: April 13, 1977

The Gen. Samuel Chandler House is a historic house at 9 Goodwin Road in Lexington, Massachusetts. The two story wood-frame house was built in 1846 to a design by architect Isaac Melvin. The Italianate style house features a bracketed shallow-pitch roof, and a three-story campanile-style tower with a steeply pitched pyramidal roof and three-part round-arch windows with balconies at its top level. A hip-roof porch with arch-forming brackets extends along one side.

The house was listed on the National Register of Historic Places in 1977.

== See also ==
- National Register of Historic Places listings in Middlesex County, Massachusetts
