= George O. Proctor =

American politician (1847-1925)

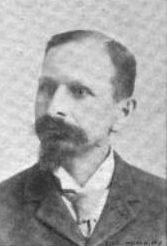

10th Mayor of Somerville, Massachusetts
- In office 1899–1900
- Preceded by: Albion A. Perry
- Succeeded by: Edward Glines

Member of the Massachusetts House of Representatives
- In office 1892–1893

Personal details
- Born: February 23, 1847 Rockingham, Vermont
- Died: March 4, 1925 (aged 78) Somerville, Massachusetts
- Party: Republican
- Spouse(s): Lilian A. Clark, m. February 7, 1865
- Occupation: Hay, Grain and Fuel Business

George Olcott Proctor (February 23, 1847 – March 4, 1925) was an American politician who served in the Massachusetts House of Representatives and as the tenth Mayor, of Somerville, Massachusetts.

== Notes ==
Political offices
Preceded by Albion A. Perry	10th Mayor of Somerville, Massachusetts; 1899–1900	Succeeded by Edward Glines
