= Ellen Stone Building =

- U.S. National Register of Historic Places
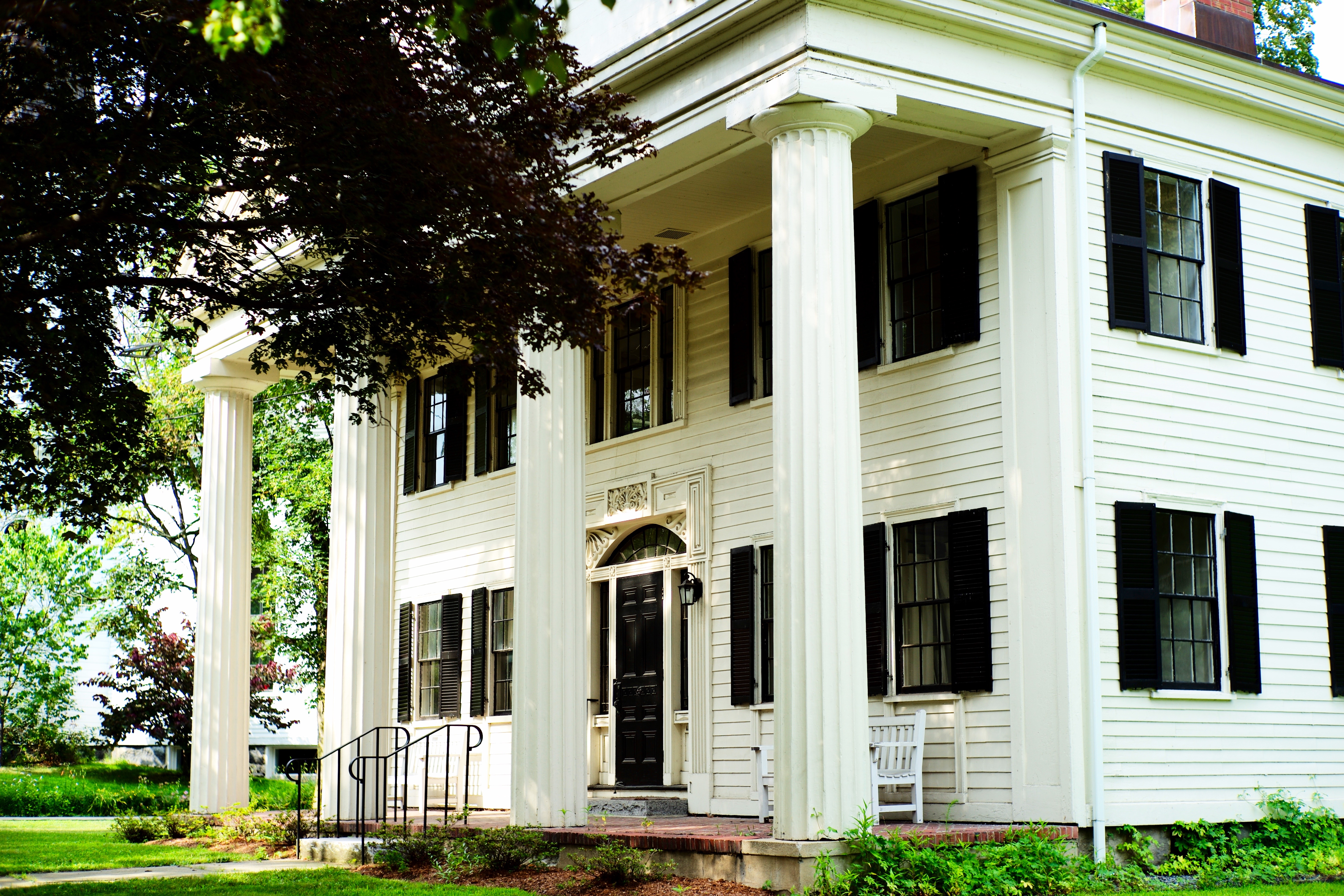
- Ellen Stone Building in 2015

- Location within Massachusetts Location within the United States
- Location: Lexington, Massachusetts
- Coordinates: 42°25′46″N 71°12′26″W
- Built: 1833
- Architect: Isaac Melvin; Curtiss Capell
- Architectural style: Greek Revival
- NRHP reference No.: 76000252
- Added to NRHP: April 30, 1976

The Ellen Stone Building, built in 1833, is an historic Greek Revival style building located at 735 Massachusetts Avenue in Lexington, Massachusetts. It was originally a meeting hall and lyceum for East Lexington, which had its own civic identity and, later, its own church, the neighboring Follen Community Church. Notable speakers at the Lyceum included Ralph Waldo Emerson, Charles Sumner, Wendell Phillips, Theodore Parker, Lucy Stone, Josiah Quincy Jr. and possibly Henry David Thoreau. Emerson served as a minister in the building for three years prior to the building of Follen Community Church.

The building was deeded to the Trustees of the Cary Memorial Library for $2,000 in 1891, by Ellen Stone, granddaughter of Eli Robbins, who built it, and it was named after her. After her death in 1944, she bequeathed $2,000 to the Town for a fund to aid needy and deserving girls in pursuit of education. The East Lexington branch library which had been established in 1883, occupied it until the building was closed for repairs after a flood in 2007.

In 1945 a demolition permit was issued for the building followed by several attempts to find a new site on which to locate it. Ultimately it was renovated as the East Branch of Cary Memorial Library in 1947.

It was listed on the National Register of Historic Places in 1976.

== Current status ==
A non-profit 501(c)(3) organization, The Lexington Lyceum Advocates, was incorporated on March 3, 2023, to promote the restoration of the building and to return it to use as a modern-day lyceum as recommended in the 2022 Stone Building Feasibility/Re-Use Committee report.

On March 29, 2023, Lexington Town Meeting approved $400k to fund a design study to explore restoration of the building.

In August 2020, the Lexington Select Board revived the proposal for the Ad Hoc Stone Building Feasibility/Re-Use Committee to find a purpose for this historic building after being unused for 13 years.

In February 2009, the Cary Memorial Library Board of Trustees announced their decision to use the Stone Building as a Lexington Heritage Center which never came to fruition.

In August, 2007, the building suffered damage from burst pipes, and was closed for repairs. The East Lexington Library never reopened.

== See also ==
- National Register of Historic Places listings in Middlesex County, Massachusetts

== Gallery ==
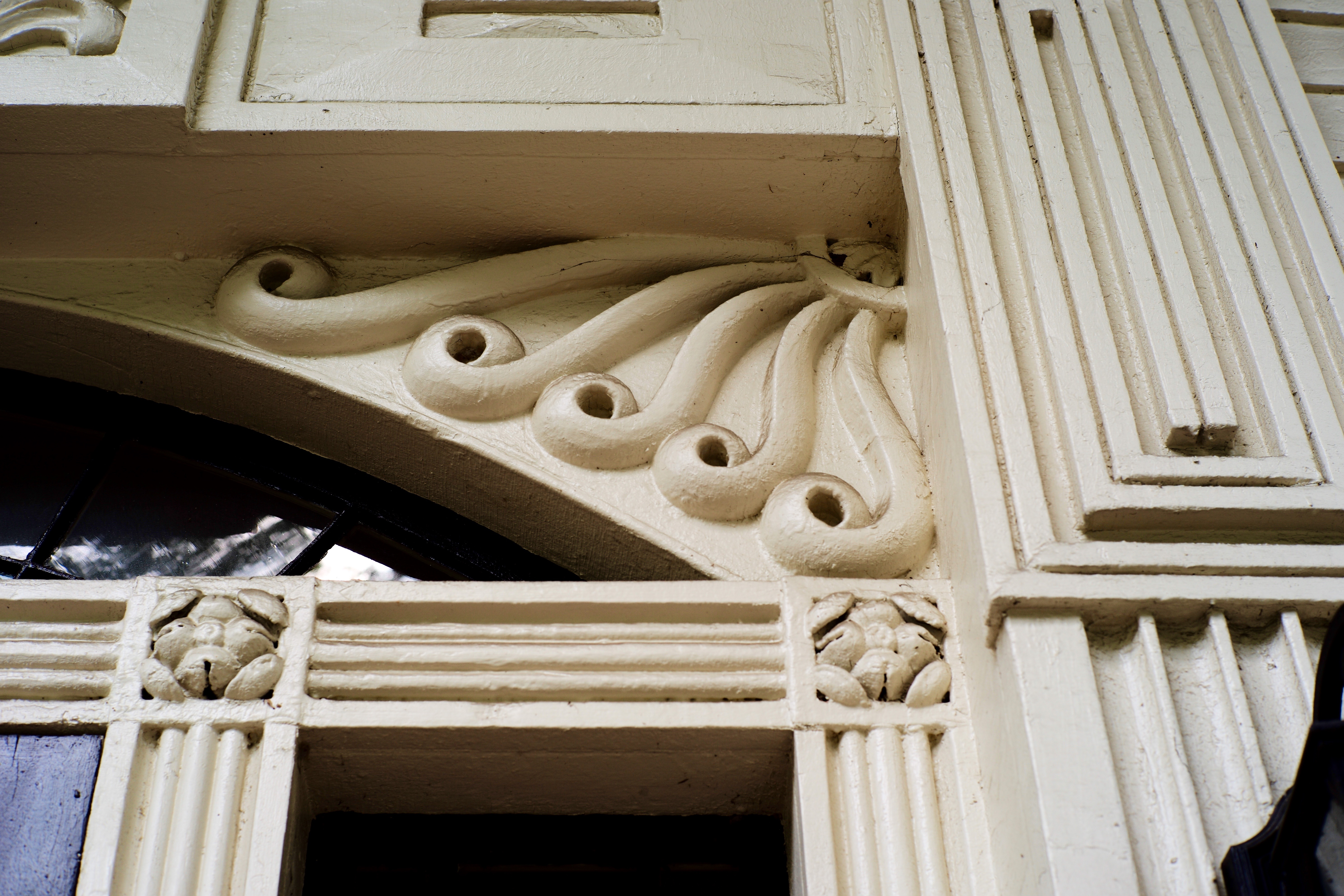
Intricate detailed woodwork around the main door
