= Leonard B. Chandler =

American politician and businessman (1851-1927)

Leonard Blanchard Chandler
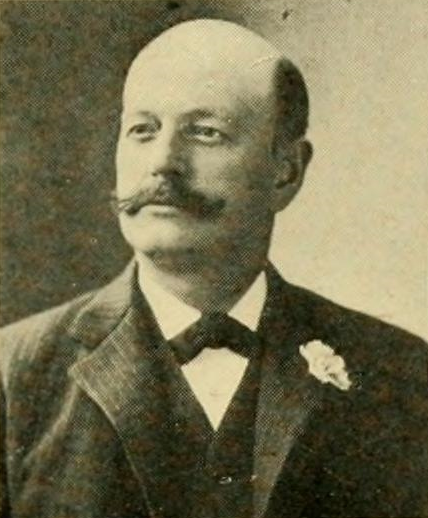

Delegate to the 1917 Massachusetts Constitutional Convention Representing the 23rd Middlesex District of the Massachusetts House of Representatives.
- In office June 6, 1917 – August 13, 1919

Twelfth Mayor of Somerville, Massachusetts
- In office January 4, 1904 – January 1, 1906
- Preceded by: Edward Glines
- Succeeded by: Charles Arnold Grimmons

Member of the Massachusetts Senate Third Middlesex District
- In office 1902–1903
- Preceded by: Franklin E. Huntress
- Succeeded by: John M. Woods

Member of the Massachusetts House of Representatives 8th Middlesex District
- In office 1897–1899

Member of the Somerville, Massachusetts Board of Aldermen Ward Three

Personal details
- Born: August 29, 1851 Princeton, Massachusetts, U.S.
- Died: November 9, 1927 (aged 76) Somerville, Massachusetts, U.S.
- Resting place: Woodlawn Cemetery, Everett, Massachusetts
- Party: Republican
- Spouse(s): Hattie Betsey Stuart, married on October 22, 1874.
- Occupation: Milk Distributor

Leonard Blanchard Chandler (August 29, 1851 – November 9, 1927) was a Massachusetts businessman and politician who served in the 1917 Massachusetts Constitutional Convention, in both branches of the Massachusetts legislature, both branches of the city council and as the twelfth Mayor of Somerville, Massachusetts.

== Early life ==
Chandler as born August 29, 1851, to Leonard and Sarah (Blanchard) Chandler in Princeton, Massachusetts.

== Family life ==
Chandler married Hattie Betsey Stewart of Charlestown, Massachusetts in Princeton, Massachusetts, on October 22, 1874. They had three children.

== 1917 Massachusetts Constitutional Convention ==
In 1916 the Massachusetts legislature and electorate approved a calling of a Constitutional Convention. In May 1917, Chandler was elected to serve as a member of the Massachusetts Constitutional Convention of 1917, representing the 23rd Middlesex District of the Massachusetts House of Representatives.

Political offices
Preceded by Edward Glines	Mayor of Somerville, Massachusetts; January 4, 1904 to January 1, 1906	Succeeded by Charles Arnold Grimmons
Preceded by Franklin E. Huntress	Massachusetts State Senator; Third Middlesex District; January 1902 to January 1903	Succeeded by John M. Woods
