= Isaac Melvin House =

Historic house in Massachusetts, United States

- U.S. National Register of Historic Places
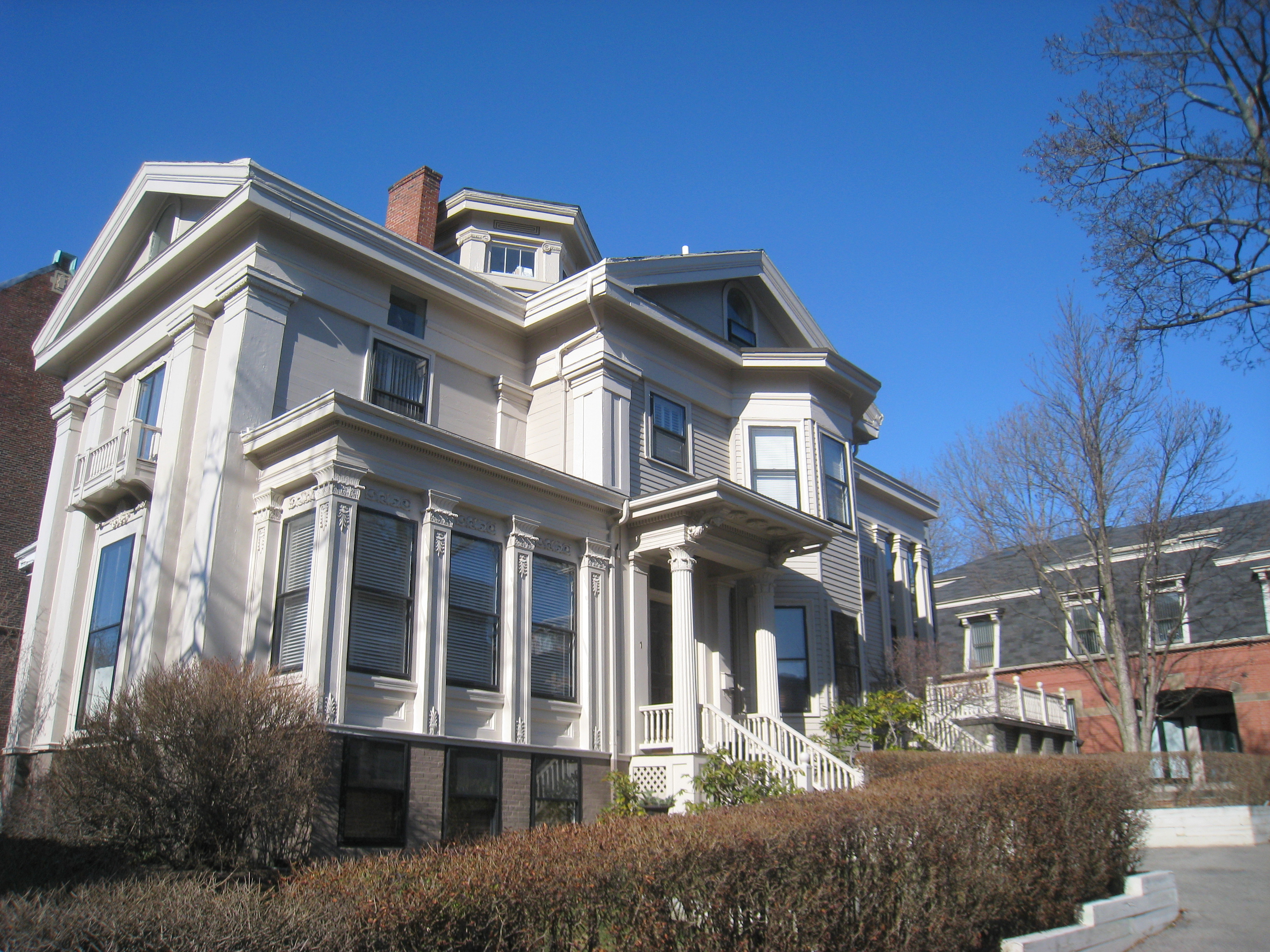

- Location within Massachusetts Location within the United States
- Location: Cambridge, Massachusetts
- Coordinates: 42°22′11.7″N 71°06′33.5″W
- Built: 1842
- Architect: Isaac Melvin; Oliver Woods
- Architectural style: Greek Revival, Italianate
- MPS: Cambridge MRA
- NRHP reference No.: 82001962
- Added to NRHP: April 13, 1982

The Isaac Melvin House is a historic house at 19 Centre Street in Cambridge, Massachusetts. This 2 1/2-story Greek Revival-Italianate house was built in 1842 by Oliver Wood and Isaac Melvin as the latter's home. Melvin is also notable for designing the North Avenue Congregational Church. Despite an Italianate T-shaped massing, the building's front facade is strongly Greek Revival, with 4 two-story pilasters supporting an entablature and topped by the fully pedimented gable end of the roof. The tympanum of the pediment has an Italianate round-arch window in it.

The house was listed on the National Register of Historic Places in 1982.

== See also ==
- National Register of Historic Places listings in Cambridge, Massachusetts
