= Austin Belknap =

American politician

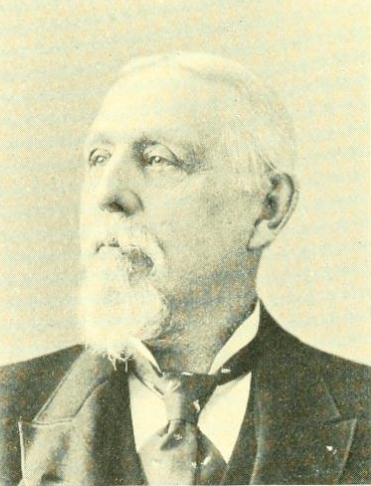

3rd Mayor of Somerville, Massachusetts
- In office January 3, 1876 – January, 1878
- Preceded by: William H. Furber
- Succeeded by: George A. Bruce

Chairman of the Somerville Massachusetts Board of Selectmen
- In office 1870 – January 2, 1872
- Preceded by: Frances Houghton
- Succeeded by: George O. Brastow, Mayoralty; Selectmen's Office Abolished

Member of the Somerville Massachusetts Board of Selectmen
- In office 1869 – January 2, 1872
- Preceded by: New position Board of Selectmen expanded from five to nine members.
- Succeeded by: George O. Brastow, Mayoralty; Selectmen's office abolished

Member of the Somerville Massachusetts School Committee
- In office 1862–1864

Personal details
- Born: July 18, 1819 Westboro, Massachusetts, U.S.
- Died: December 9, 1902 Roxbury, Massachusetts, U.S.
- Spouse: Jane P. Brigham
- Children: Robert W. Belknap
- Education: Worcester Manual Labor High School
- Profession: Civil engineer, engaged in Railway construction until 1843; Produce business from 1843 to December 1902

Austin Belknap (July 18, 1819 – December 9, 1902) was a Massachusetts businessman and politician who served as a member, and last Chairman, of the Board of Selectmen of Somerville, Massachusetts, and as the third Mayor, of Somerville.

== Early life ==
Belknap was born July 18, 1819, in Westboro, Massachusetts, to John and Ruth (Fay) Belknap of Westboro.

== Notes ==
Political offices
Preceded by Frances Houghton	Chairman of the Somerville, Massachusetts; Board of Selectmen; 1870-January 2, 1872	Succeeded by Office abolished
Preceded by William H. Furber	Mayor of Somerville, Massachusetts; January, 1876-January, 1878	Succeeded by George A. Bruce
