= North Avenue Congregational Church =

Historic church in Cambridge, Massachusetts

- U.S. National Register of Historic Places
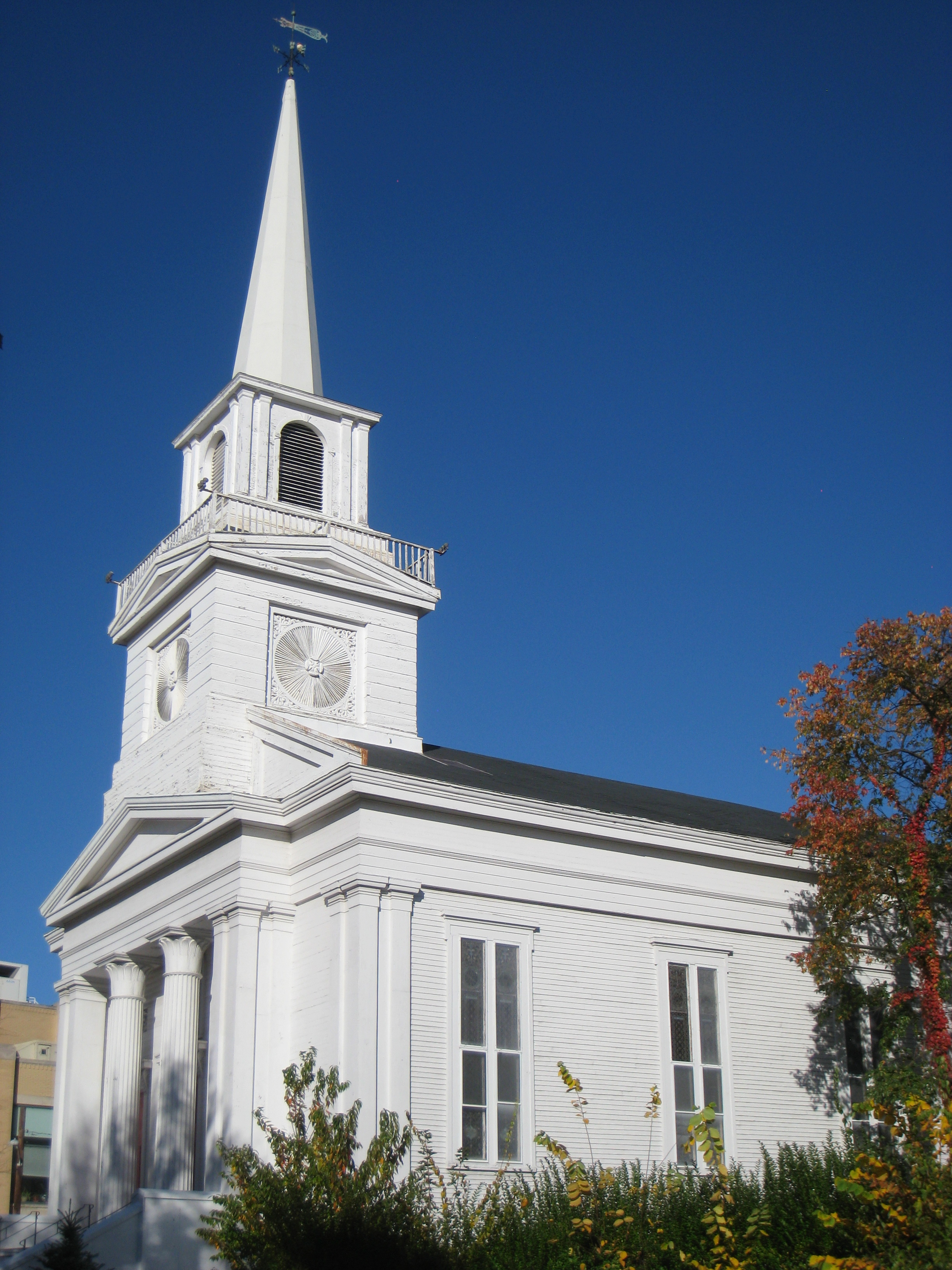

- Location within Massachusetts Location within the United States
- Location: Cambridge, Massachusetts
- Coordinates: 42°23′11″N 71°07′07″W
- Built: 1845
- Architectural style: Greek Revival
- MPS: Cambridge MRA
- NRHP reference No.: 83000819
- Added to NRHP: June 30, 1983

North Avenue Congregational Church (now known as John and Carol Moriarty Library, and previously as Old Cambridge Baptist Church and North Prospect Congregational Church and Prospect Hall) is a historic church meetinghouse at 1801 (previously at 1803) Massachusetts Avenue in Cambridge, Massachusetts. It was completely renovated in 2015 to become a library for Lesley University. The former church now forms part of what is now the Lunder Arts Center complex.

== History of ownership ==
The church was originally built in 1845 on Kirkland Street near Harvard Square, for the Old Cambridge Baptist Church congregation, to designs by local architect Isaac Melvin. It was sold to the North Avenue Congregational Society in 1866 at which time it was renamed the North Avenue Congregational Church. In 1867 it was moved up Massachusetts Avenue (called North Avenue at the time) to a site immediately north of its current location. The building was added to the National Register of Historic Places in 1983, and sold to Lesley University in 2006 subsequent to the movement of the congregation to Medford, Massachusetts.

=== Lesley University ===
The university used the former church primarily as an auditorium and lecture hall space following its purchase until preparations for the Lunder Arts Center began. Prior to renovation, the university sold or donated many of the church fixtures. A new home was found for the historic 18-foot organ, in a Texas church. The stained-glass windows, however, were restored and were returned to the building after renovations. In addition to the window restoration, the historic exterior details of the building were restored. A cupola, which is a reproduction of the former belfry c. 1900, was added, with the original weathervane atop.

The renovated building houses a library specializing in Art and Art History for Lesley's College of Art and Design (previously located in the Kenmore area of Boston).

On December 5, 2013, the university moved the building approximately 100 feet south on its lot to make way for the new building at the corner of Massachusetts Avenue and Roseland Street, between the church and the adjacent University Hall building. The new location changes the building's address from 1803 Massachusetts Avenue to 1801.

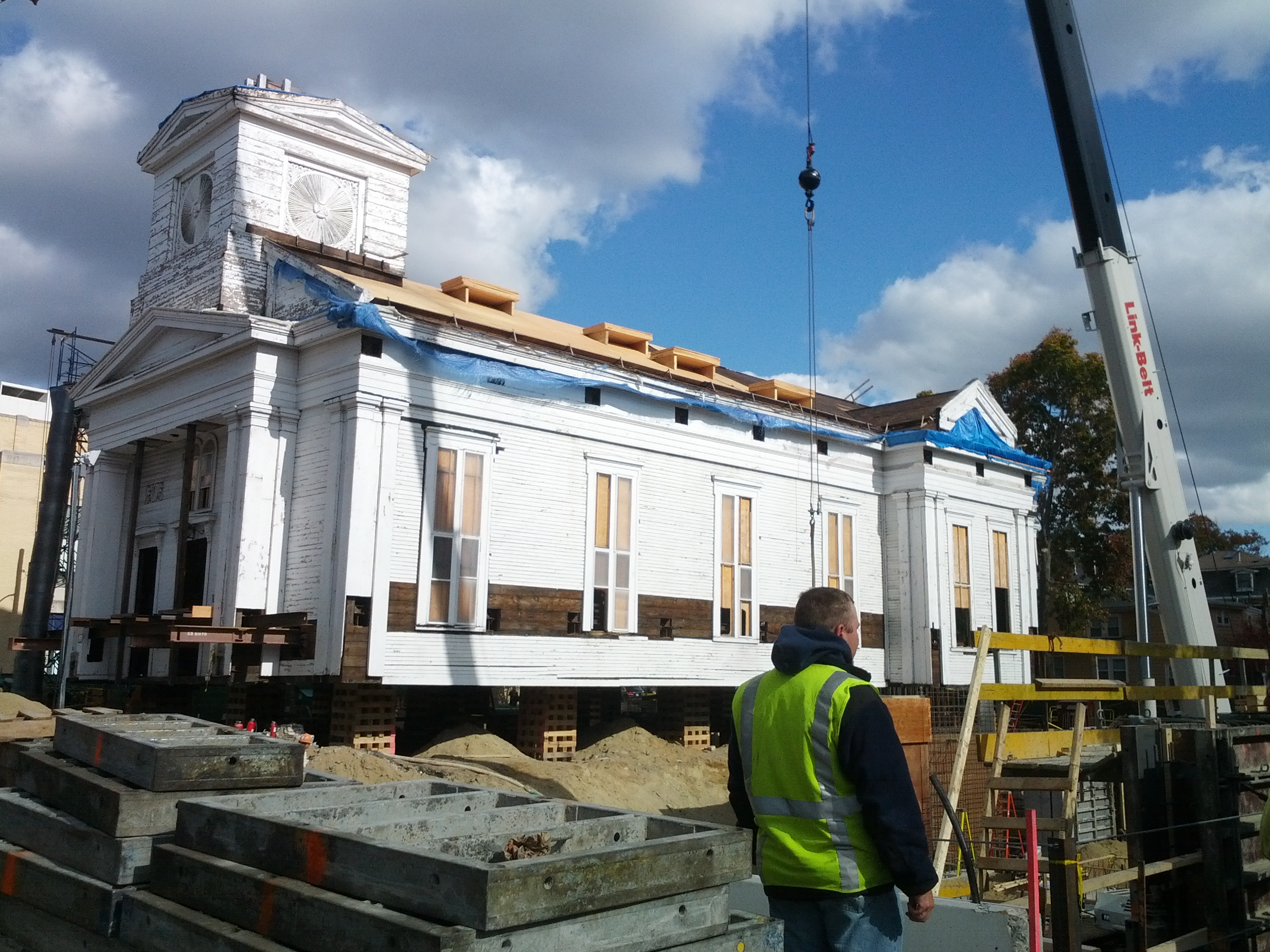
Workers prepare to relocate the North Prospect Church, future home of Lesley University's College of Art and Design

== Design ==
The building's simple, rectangular plan was originally four bays deep with a tall, multi-stage spire surmounting a projecting entrance portico; it then resembled Charles Bulfinch's New South Church in Boston (1814) though in Greek Revival form with Egyptian columns. The addition of a chancel and transepts in 1872 created a cruciform plan. The original three-stage tower and spire, similar to that of the New South Church, was damaged in a storm, and in 1906 its upper two round stages and spire were replaced with a square belfry and a copper dome. Today's eight-faceted spire was built in 1964 after the dome was struck by lightning and caught fire, and now only the pedimented first stage of the original steeple remains.

== See also ==
- Isaac Melvin House
- National Register of Historic Places listings in Cambridge, Massachusetts
