= Charles W. Eldridge =

American politician (1877-1965)

Charles Wadleigh Eldridge
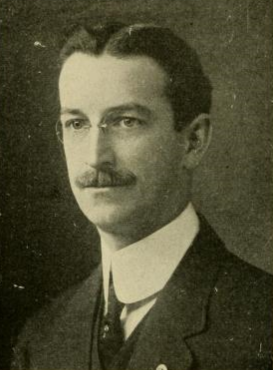

Seventeenth Mayor of Somerville, Massachusetts
- In office January 7, 1918 – January 1922
- Preceded by: Zebedee E. Cliff
- Succeeded by: John M. Webster

Member of the Massachusetts Senate Third Middlesex District
- In office January 1914 – January 1918
- Preceded by: Charles V. Blanchard
- Succeeded by: Joseph O. Knox

Member of the Massachusetts House of Representatives Twenty Sixth Middlesex District
- In office 1911–1913

Member of the Somerville, Massachusetts Board of Aldermen
- In office 1907–1910

Personal details
- Born: October 16, 1877 Boston, Massachusetts, U.S.
- Died: May 15, 1965 (aged 87)
- Party: Republican
- Spouse: Edith L.
- Children: Raymon W. Eldridge; Arthur F. Eldridge; Warren P. Eldridge; Louise Eldridge; Charlotte Eldridge
- Profession: Salesman for Chase & Sanborn

Charles Wadleigh Eldridge (October 16, 1877 – May 15, 1965) was a Massachusetts businessman and politician who served as a member in both the House and Senate of the Massachusetts legislature, as a member of the Board of Aldermen, and as the seventeenth Mayor of Somerville, Massachusetts.

Eldridge was a delegate to the 1920 Republican National Convention.

In addition to his duties as an officeholder, Eldridge also started working as a salesman for Chase & Sanborn in 1893.

Eldridge had married Edith, the daughter of Harriett J. Brown. Eldridge had five children: Raymon W. Eldridge, Arthur F. Eldridge, Warren P. Eldridge, Louise Eldridge, and Charlotte Eldridge.

== See also ==
- 1915 Massachusetts legislature
- 1916 Massachusetts legislature
- 1917 Massachusetts legislature

== Notes ==
Political offices
Preceded by Zebedee E. Cliff	Mayor of Somerville, Massachusetts; January 7, 1918-January 1922	Succeeded by John M. Webster
Preceded by Charles V. Blanchard	Member of the Massachusetts Senate; Third Middlesex District; January 1914 – January 1918	Succeeded by Joseph O. Knox
