= Harold W. Wells =

American politician (died 1978)

27th Mayor of Somerville, Massachusetts
- In office January 1960 – January 1, 1962
- Preceded by: Paul M. Haley
- Succeeded by: Lawrence F. Bretta

Personal details
- Born: Somerville, Massachusetts
- Died: February 13, 1978 (aged 64) Somerville, Massachusetts, U.S.
- Resting place: Greenlawn Cemetery; Nahant, Massachusetts, U.S.
- Party: Democratic
- Spouse: Josephine R. Sileno
- Children: 2
- Education: Tufts College
- Occupation: Politician; jeweler

Harold W. Wells (died February 13, 1978) was a Massachusetts politician who served as the 27th Mayor of Somerville, Massachusetts.

== Early life ==
Harold W. Wells was born in Somerville, Massachusetts, to Mary E. (née Coughlin) and James B. Wells. His father was a bakery salesman. As a boy, he helped the milkman make deliveries and did house-to-house doughnut sales. He attended St. Ann's School and graduated from Bridgton Academy in Maine. He attended Tufts College and majored in chemistry, but left after his second year due to the Great Depression.

== Career ==
Wells served in the United States Navy during World War II. He was a torpedoman on a destroyer.

In 1956, Wells was elected as city assessor in Somerville. He served in that role for four years. He ran for mayor, but lost to William J. Donovan. He served as mayor from 1960 to 1961. The Boston Globe's "Spotlight" team found evidence in 1971 that he favored five contractors while mayor and gave half a million dollars of no-bid business to them. He ran again in 1961, but lost to Lawrence F. Bretta.

Wells was owner and manager of Marwel Jewelers in Magoun Square in Somerville. He served as military aide to Governor Foster Furcolo. He was president of the Somerville Lions Club.

== Personal life ==
Wells married Josephine R. Sileno. They had two sons, James P. and Richard H. In 1959, he lived on Walker Street in Somerville. Later in life, he lived in Nahant.

He died on February 13, 1978, aged 64, in Somerville Hospital. He was buried in Greenlawn Cemetery in Nahant.

== Awards ==
In 1957, the American Legion in Somerville selected him as "Man of the Year".

Political offices
Preceded by Paul M. Haley	27th Mayor of Somerville, Massachusetts; January 1960-January 1, 1962	Succeeded by Lawrence F. Bretta
