= John M. Webster =

American politician (1877-1963)

18th Mayor of Somerville, Massachusetts
- In office January 1922 – January 4, 1926
- Preceded by: Charles W. Eldridge
- Succeeded by: Leon M. Conwell
- Majority: 4,626 (1921)

President of the Somerville, Massachusetts Board of Aldermen

Member of the Somerville, Massachusetts Board of Aldermen Ward 4

Personal details
- Born: July 20, 1877 New Brunswick, Canada
- Died: June 7, 1963 (aged 85) Somerville, Massachusetts, U.S.
- Party: Republican

John M. Webster (July 20, 1877 – June 7, 1963) was an American politician who served as the eighteenth Mayor, of Somerville, Massachusetts.

In December 1921 Webster was elected Mayor of Somerville, he was reelected over John J. Murphy in December 1923.

== Notes ==
Political offices
Preceded by Charles W. Eldridge	18th Mayor of Somerville, Massachusetts; January 1922 – January 4, 1926	Succeeded by Leon M. Conwell
