= Lawrence F. Bretta =

Politician in Massachusetts, US

Lawrence Francis Bretta

Mayor of Somerville
- In office January 1, 1962 – July 17, 1967
- Preceded by: Harold W. Wells
- Succeeded by: John R. Havican (acting)

Massachusetts House of Representatives
- In office 1959 – 1962
- Preceded by: Harold A. Palmer
- Succeeded by: Joseph Thomas Travalini
- Constituency: 24th Middlesex district

Chairman of the Somerville School Committee
- In office 1958 – 1958

Member of the Somerville School Committee
- In office 1956 – 1962

Personal details
- Born: January 12, 1928 Somerville, Massachusetts
- Died: September 2, 2006 Medford, Massachusetts
- Resting place: Oak Grove Cemetery, Medford, Massachusetts
- Party: Democratic
- Spouse: Joan E. Benway
- Criminal information
- Convictions: Solicitation; bribery
- Penalty: Four years (federal)

Lawrence Francis Bretta (January 12, 1928 – September 2, 2006) was a Massachusetts businessman and politician who served in the Massachusetts House of Representatives and as the Mayor of Somerville, Massachusetts. He was regional director of the General Service Administration until his resignation in February 1984 while under investigation on corruption charges. He pleaded guilty to a federal indictment alleging solicitation and acceptance of bribes on connection with the location of a federal Social Security office in the Mystic Mall in Chelsea, Massachusetts and was sentenced to four years in prison. He was released in 1988.

Political offices
Preceded by Harold W. Wells	Mayor of Somerville, Massachusetts; January 1, 1962 – July 17, 1967	Succeeded by James F. Brennan
Preceded by Harold A. Palmer	Massachusetts State Representative; 24th Middlesex District; January 1959 – January 1962	Succeeded by Joseph Thomas Travalini
