= Isaac Melvin =

American architect

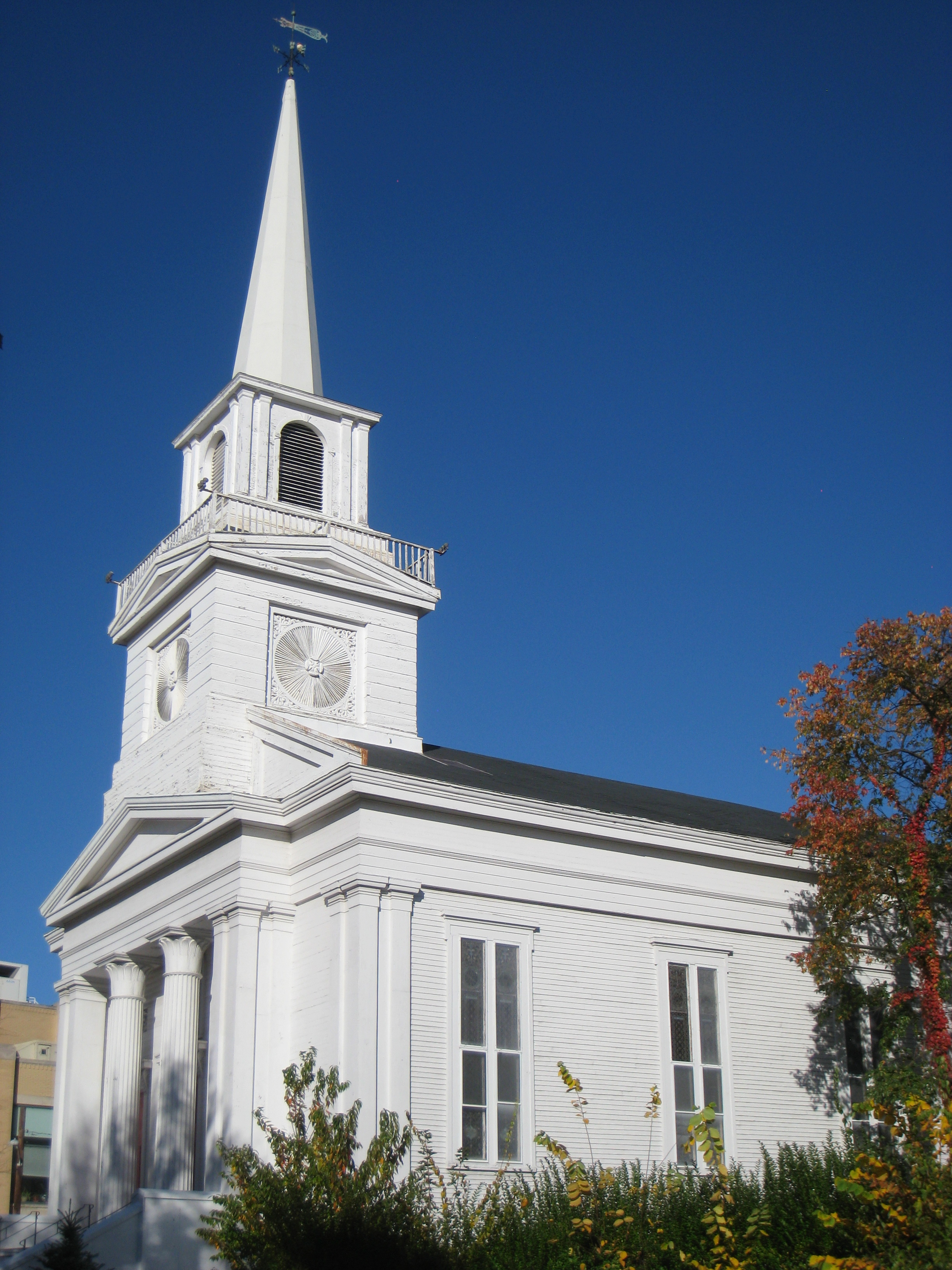
Old Cambridge Baptist Church, Cambridge, MA. 1845.

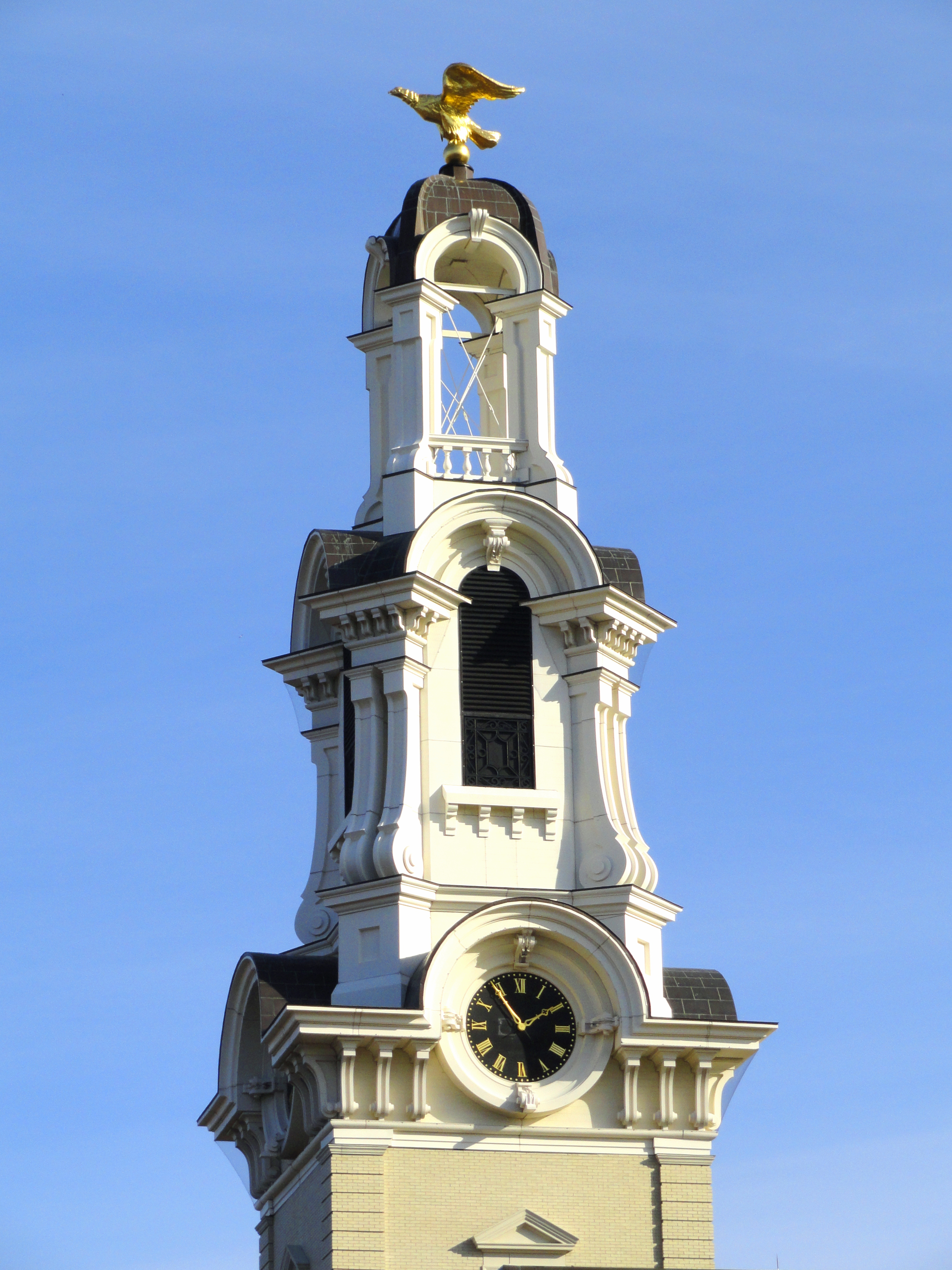
Tower, Lawrence City Hall, Lawrence, MA. 1848-49.

Isaac Melvin (1811-1853) was an American architect from Massachusetts.

Melvin was born in Concord, Massachusetts in 1811. In the 1830s, he established himself as a builder in Lexington. In 1841 he relocated to Cambridge, where he added architecture to his profession. In about 1848 he gave up construction, taking up solely architecture. He formed a partnership with Isaiah B. Young (who had worked with him since 1846), and the two opened an office in Boston. They dissolved their partnership in 1852, when Melvin decided to go to San Francisco. He grew ill on the voyage, and died in San Francisco soon after his arrival.

After Melvin's departure, Young pursued an architectural career in Boston, New York, Philadelphia, and Cincinnati.

== Works ==
- Stone Building, 735 Massachusetts Ave., East Lexington, MA (1833)
- Isaac Melvin House, 19 Centre St., Cambridge, MA (1842)
- Old Cambridge Baptist Church, 1801 Massachusetts Ave., Cambridge, MA (1845)
- Samuel Chandler House, 8 Goodwin Rd., Lexington, MA (1846)
- Lexington Town Hall, 1475 Massachusetts Ave., Lexington, MA (1846) - Demolished.
- Mount Pleasant Congregational Society, Roxbury, MA (1846) - Demolished.
- First Church of Christ, 136 Main St., Sandwich, MA (1847)
- First Parish Church, 7 Harrington Rd., Lexington, MA (1847)
- Lawrence City Hall, 100 Common St., Lawrence, MA (1848–49) - Remodeled in 1923 by George G. Adams.
- Porter Congregational Church, 33 N. Main St., Brockton, MA (1850)
- Allen Street Congregational Church, Allen & Orchard Sts., Cambridge, MA (1851) - Demolished.
- Somerville City Hall, Somerville, Massachusetts (1851–52)
- Arlington Town Hall, Massachusetts Ave. & Mystic St., Arlington, MA (1852–53) - Demolished.
- Union No. 2 Engine House, 789 Main St., Cambridge, MA (1852)
