= Cary Memorial Library =

Public library in Lexington, Massachusetts

Coordinates: 42°26′53.8″N 71°13′46.8″W

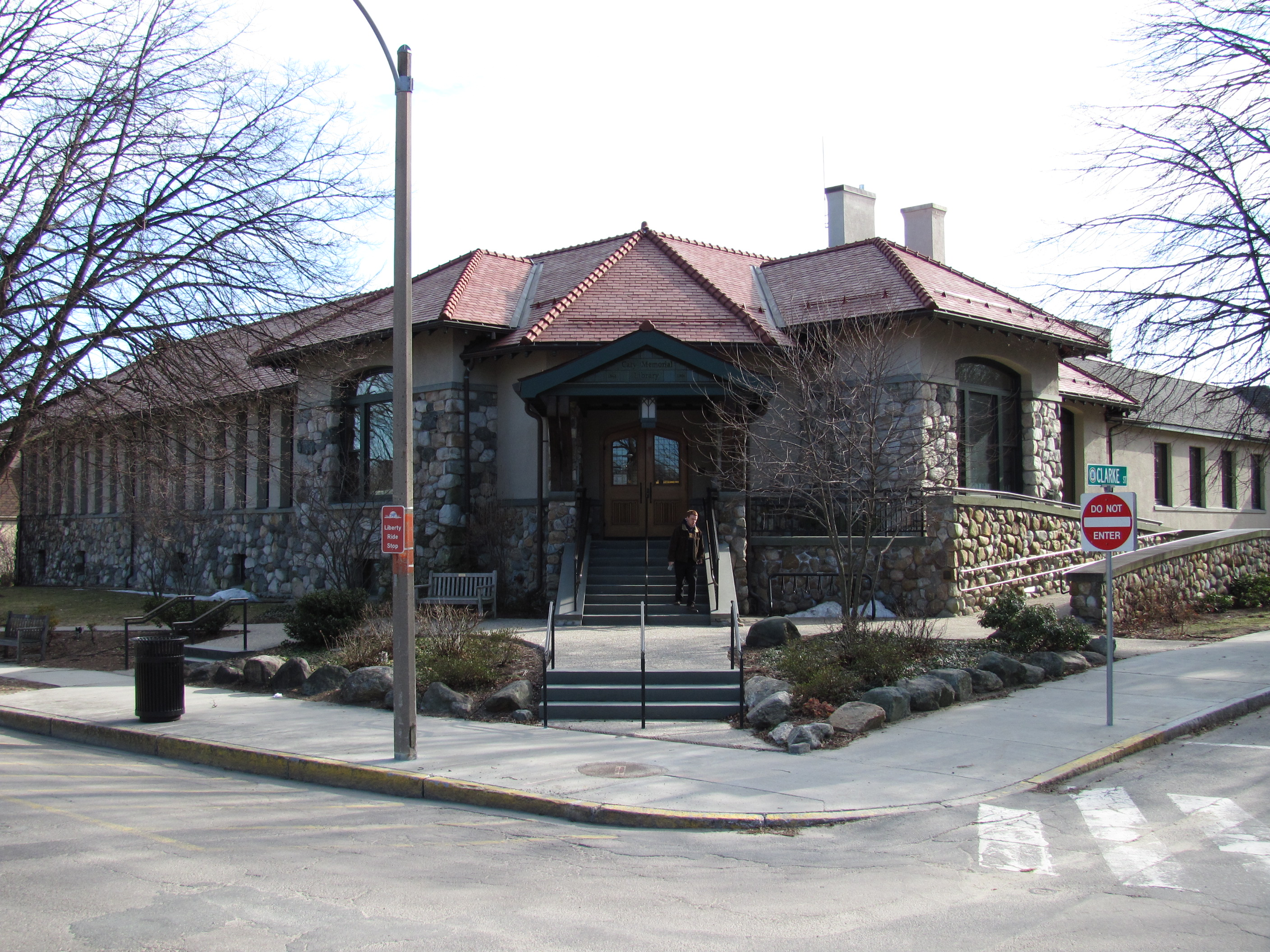
- The Cary Memorial Library in 2010
- Location: 1874 Massachusetts Ave, Lexington, Massachusetts, USA
- Established: 1869

Other information
- Website: https://www.carylibrary.org/

The Cary Memorial Library (est.1869) is the main branch of the public library in Lexington, Massachusetts. It is located at 1874 Massachusetts Avenue in the town center.

== History ==
"In 1868 Mrs. Maria Hastings Cary proposed to give $1000 to Lexington to establish a free public library, on condition that a similar sum should be raised in money or in books for the same object. ... The proposition was gratefully accepted and the conditions complied with, by the donation of the other libraries to this object and an appropriation of money by the town. Such was the origin of Cary Library, so named in honor of the original donor." "In 1871, Mrs. Cary being pleased with the public appreciation and usefulness of the library, gave $5000 towards a permanent endowment."

By 1890, the library held "between 12,000 and 13,000 volumes. It is highly prized by the people and extensively used; more than 25,000 volumes have been drawn from it during the last year. From 500 to 800 new books are added annually. ... A branch library is maintained in the east village."

The library building was built with a bequest from Alice Butler Cary, adopted daughter of Maria Hastings Cary. Construction began in 1905 and was completed in 1906. The architect was Willard D. Brown of Boston, a Lexington resident. The building has been expanded several times since.

In fiscal year 2008, the town of Lexington spent 1.81% ($1,926,194) of its budget on the library—some $63 per person.

== Image gallery ==
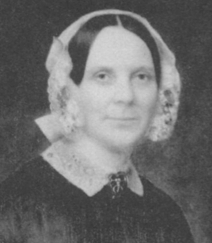
Portrait of Maria Hastings Cary, benefactor, 19th century

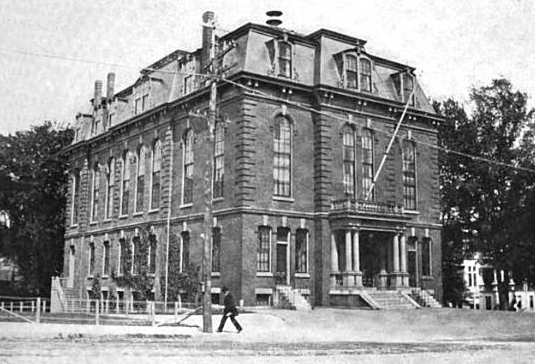
Lexington town hall and public library, c. 1899

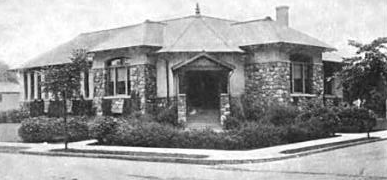
Library, 1913

== See also ==
- Stone Building (Lexington, Massachusetts)
