= Z. E. Cliff House =

Historic house in Massachusetts, United States

- U.S. National Register of Historic Places
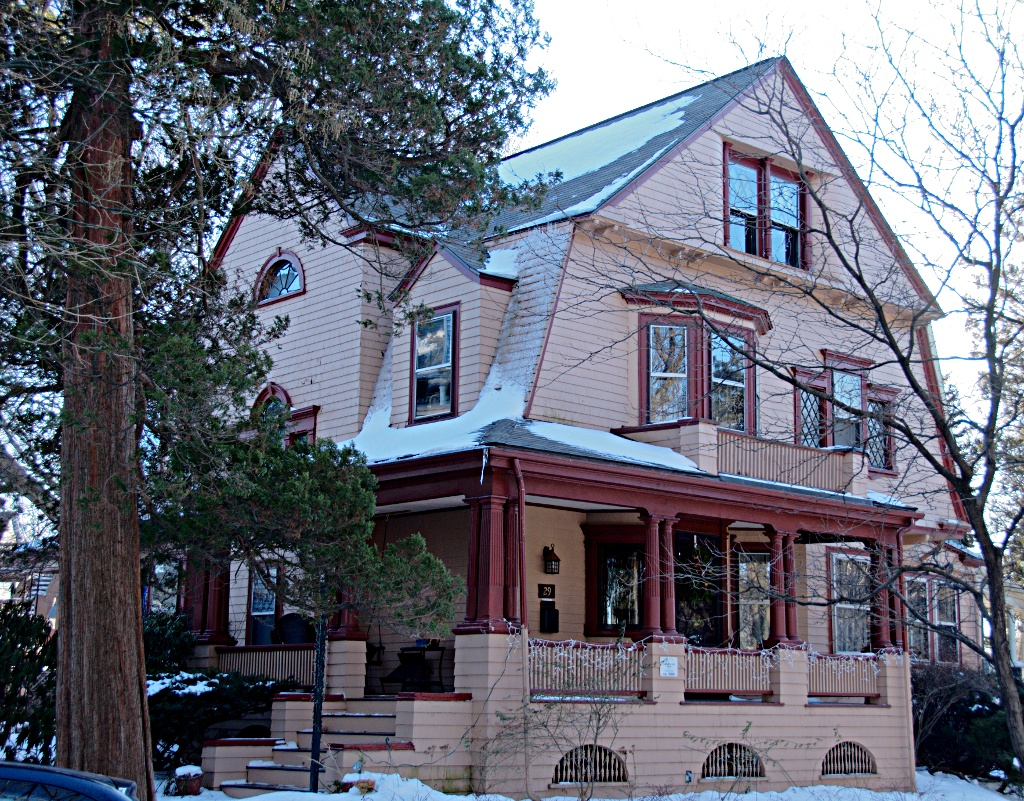

- Location within Massachusetts Location within the United States
- Location: 29 Powderhouse Terr., Somerville, Massachusetts
- Coordinates: 42°23′58.8794″N 71°6′59.8151″W
- Area: less than one acre
- Built: 1900
- Architect: Cliff, Z.E.
- Architectural style: Shingle Style
- MPS: Somerville MPS
- NRHP reference No.: 89001280
- Added to NRHP: September 18, 1989

The Z. E. Cliff House is a historic house located at 29 Powderhouse Terrace in Somerville, Massachusetts. Built about 1900 by a prominent local developer for his own use, it is one of the city's finest examples of residential Shingle style architecture. It was listed on the National Register of Historic Places in 1989.

== Description and history ==
The Z.E. Cliff House stands on the south side of Powderhouse Terrace, facing Nathan Tufts Park to the north, in Somerville's Powder House Square neighborhood. It is a large 2 1/2-story wood-frame structure, with a broad cross-gabled gambrel roof. The roof's side gables are conventional gables, their facades flush to the main wall, with a Palladian style three-part window near the center and a half-round window near the gable peak. The front-facing gambrel has a projecting attic level with a recessed pair of diamond-pane sash windows. The second floor has a projecting polygonal window bay on the left side and a Palladian arrangement on the right. Below the left bay on the first floor is the main entrance, sheltered by a porch that extends around to the left side. The porch is supported by grouped columns set on shingled posts with simple low balustrades between then. To the right of the entrance is a polygonal section with simple sash windows.

The house was built about 1900 by Zebedee E. Cliff, a prominent local real estate developer and politician. Powderhouse Terrace was one of his highest-quality subdivisions. Cliff served an alderman and later mayor of Somerville. A carpenter turned developer, he has been credited with undertaking over $2 million worth of construction in Somerville before his death in 1934.

== Gallery ==
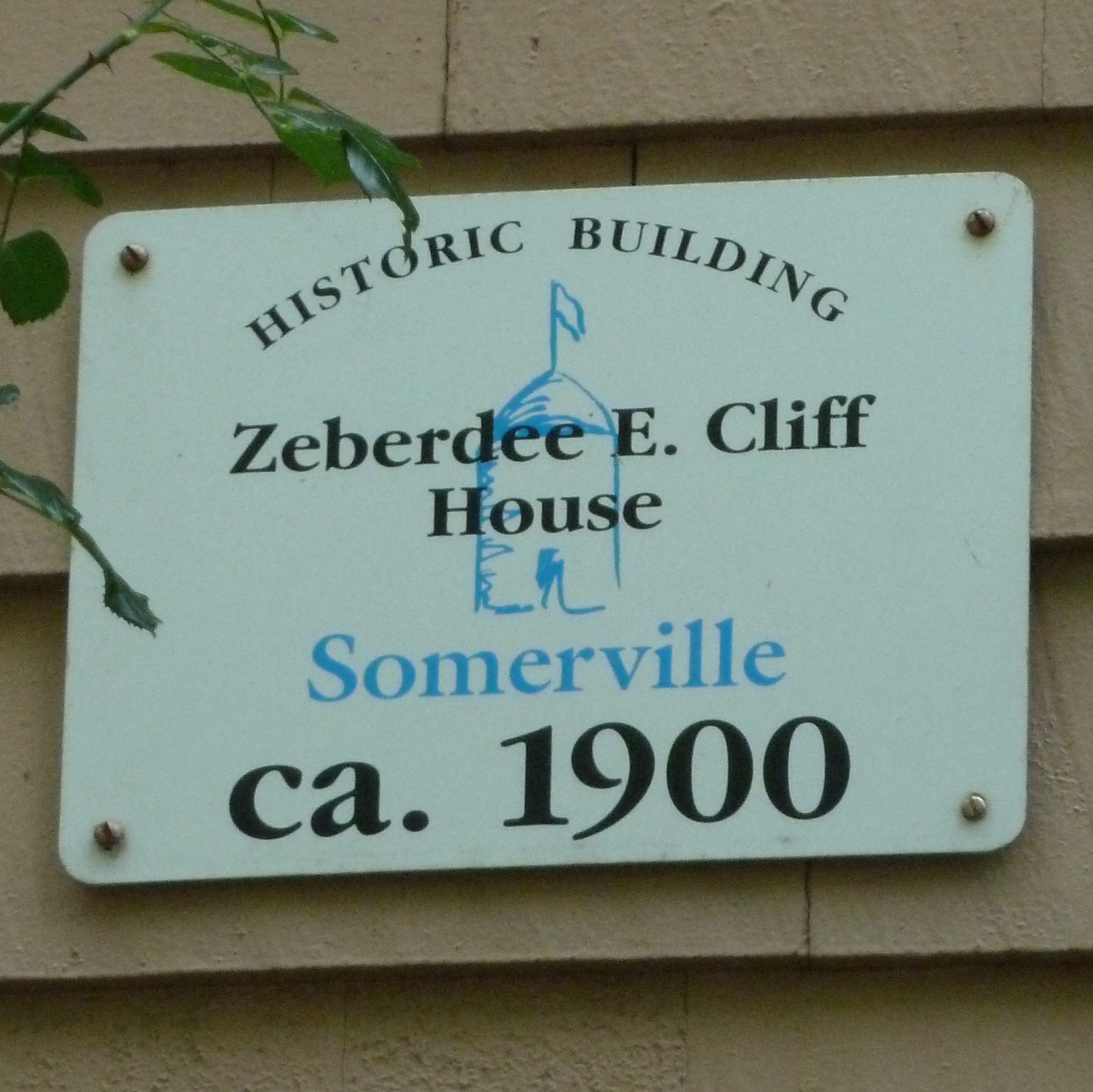
The identifying sign on the face of the Z. E. Cliff House

== See also ==
- National Register of Historic Places listings in Somerville, Massachusetts
