= Cliff Cottage =

Historic house in Massachusetts, United States

- U.S. National Register of Historic Places
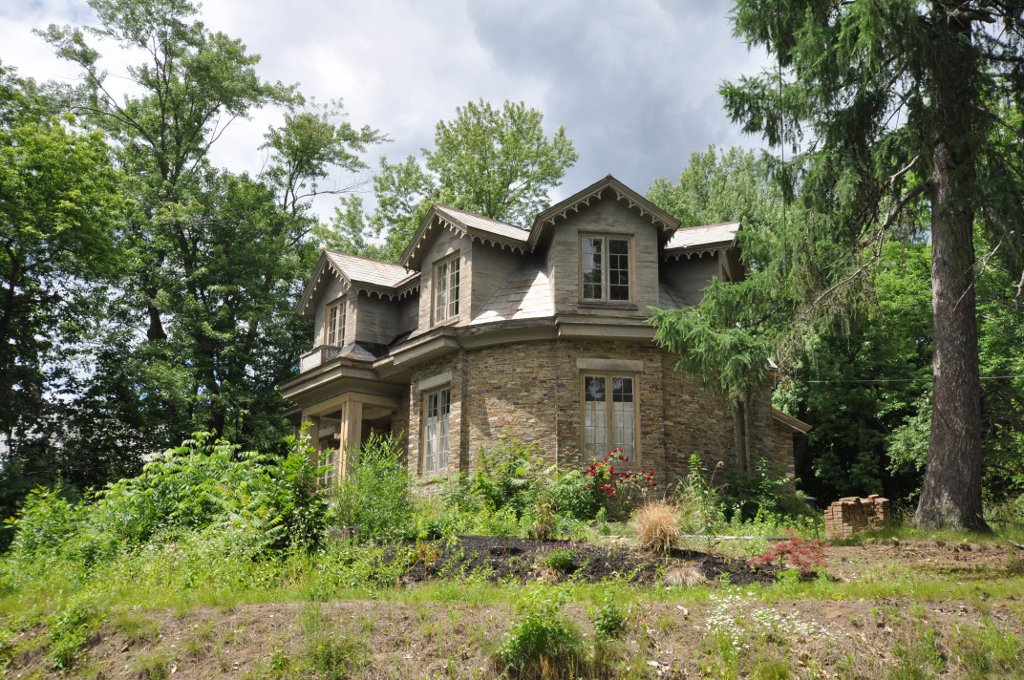

- Location within Massachusetts Location within the United States
- Location: 787 Mill St., Southbridge, Massachusetts
- Coordinates: 42°5′1″N 72°2′29″W
- Architectural style: Greek Revival, Gothic Revival
- MPS: Southbridge MRA
- NRHP reference No.: 89000570
- Added to NRHP: June 22, 1989

The Cliff Cottage is a historic cottage at 187 Mill Street (at its corner with Cliff Street) in Southbridge, Massachusetts. Built before 1855, it is a distinctive combination of Greek Revival and Gothic features executed in stone. It was listed on the National Register of Historic Places in 1989.

== Description and history ==
Cliff Cottage is located in Southbridge's Globe Village area, on the north side of Mill Street east of Fisk Street. It is set on a rise above the street that overlooks the Quinebaug River. It is a 1 1/2-story structure, built principally out of stone. The main level of the house is built of paneled stone, and has an asymmetrical T-shaped layout. It has original casement windows, and its roof is punctured by a series of gable end dormers decorated with scallop trim. The porch is in a Greek Revival style. The house is a rare example of Gothic styling in Southbridge.

The house was built sometime before 1855, when it first appears on local maps. The combination of Greek Revival and Gothic Revival features suggests that it was built after 1830. The area was then experiencing rapid growth due to the success of the Hamilton Company mills, and this part of Globe Village was developed by the locally prominent McKinstry family. It is not known for whom this house was built; its owner in 1855 was listed as F. McKinstry. It was given a substantial renovation in 2014 and 2015. In 2017, the original barn was razed and replaced.

== Gallery ==
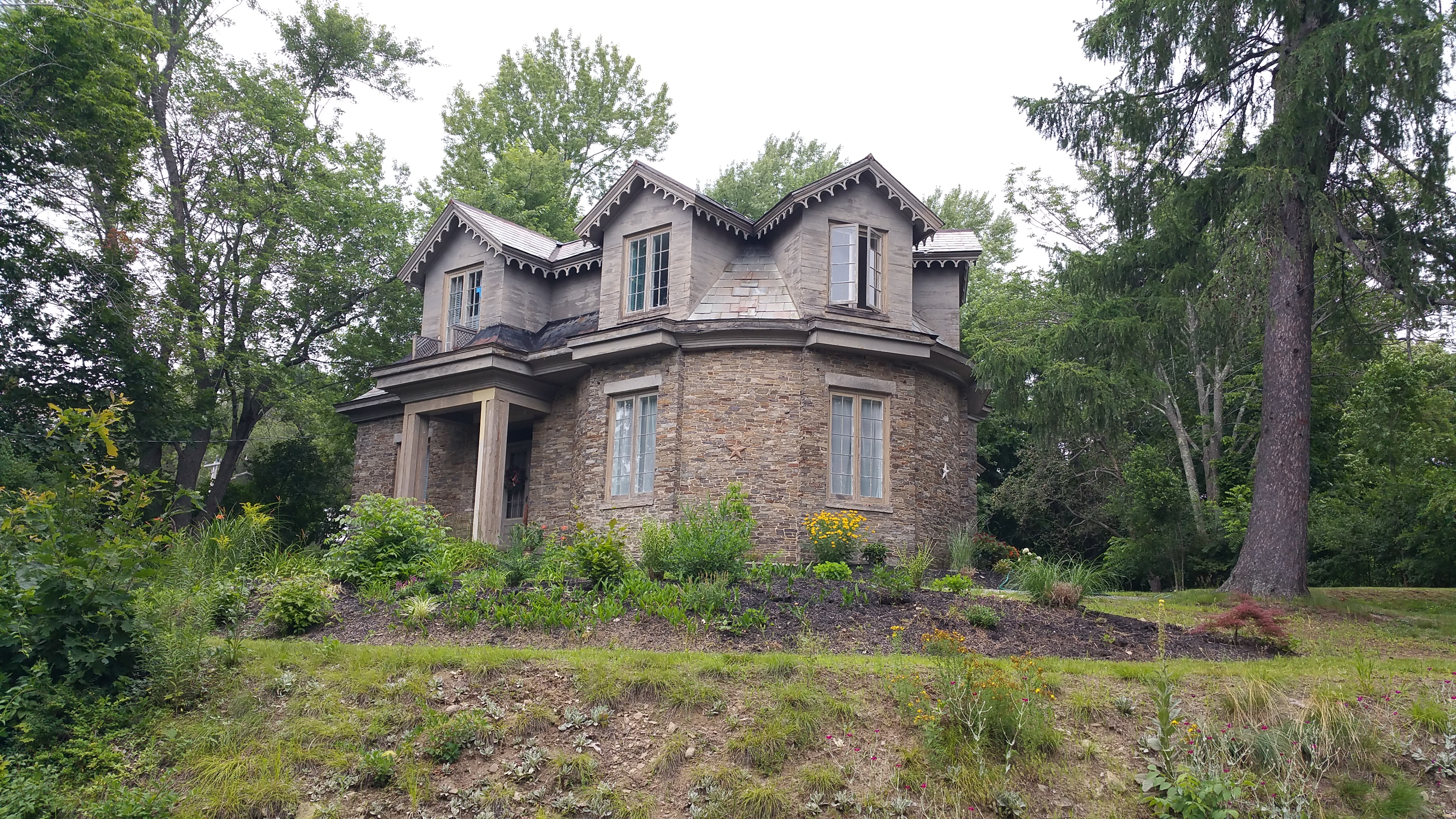
July 2015 photo

== See also ==
- National Register of Historic Places listings in Southbridge, Massachusetts
- National Register of Historic Places listings in Worcester County, Massachusetts
