= William H. Hodgkins =

American politician (1840-1905)

William Henry Hodgkins
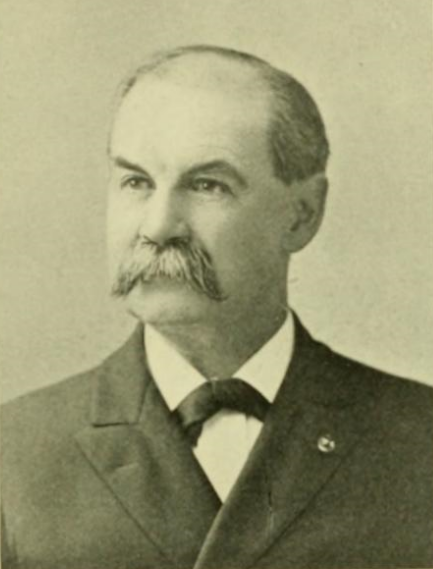

8th Mayor of Somerville, Massachusetts
- In office 1892 – January 6, 1896
- Preceded by: Charles G. Pope
- Succeeded by: Albion A. Perry

Member of the Massachusetts State Senate Third Middlesex District
- In office 1898–1899
- Preceded by: James A. Bailey, Jr.
- Succeeded by: Franklin A. Huntress
- Majority: 2,891 (1898).

President of the Somerville, Massachusetts Common Council
- In office 1874–1874
- Preceded by: Charles G. Pope
- Succeeded by: Samuel M. Pennock

Member of the Somerville, Massachusetts Common Council Ward 3
- In office 1873–1874

Personal details
- Born: June 9, 1840 Charlestown, Massachusetts
- Died: September 24, 1905 (aged 65)
- Party: Republican

Military service
- Allegiance: United States of America; Union
- Years of service: July 22, 1862-June 8, 1865
- Rank: Second Lieutenant, (October 17, 1862); First Lieutenant and Adjutant, (October 23, 1863); Captain (May 6, 1864); Brevet Major, (March 25, 1865).
- Unit: Army of the Cumberland *Company B Thirty-sixth Massachusetts Infantry
- Battles/wars: American Civil War, *Battle of Fort Stedman

William Henry Hodgkins (June 9, 1840 – September 24, 1905) was an American politician who served in the Massachusetts State Senate, as a member and President of the Somerville, Massachusetts, Common Council and as the eighth Mayor of Somerville, Massachusetts.

== See also ==
- 119th Massachusetts General Court (1898)

== Notes ==
Political offices
Preceded by James A. Bailey, Jr.	Member of the Massachusetts State Senate; Third Middlesex District; 1898-1899	Succeeded by Franklin A. Huntress
Preceded by Charles G. Pope	8th Mayor of Somerville, Massachusetts; 1892-January 6, 1896	Succeeded by Albion A. Perry
Preceded by Charles G. Pope	President of the Somerville, Massachusetts, Common Council; 1874-1874	Succeeded by Samuel M. Pennock
