= Charles V. Blanchard =

American politician (1866-1939)

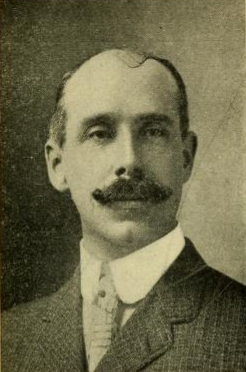
- Blanchard circa 1911

Massachusetts Senate Third Middlesex District
- In office 1910 – January 1914
- Preceded by: Elmer A. Stevens
- Succeeded by: Charles W. Eldridge

Member of the Massachusetts House of Representatives 26th Middlesex District
- In office 1906–1909

Personal details
- Born: February 2, 1866 Cambridge, Massachusetts, U.S.
- Died: February 20, 1939 (aged 73) Florida, U.S.
- Party: Republican
- Children: Howard Blanchard; Ida Blanchard
- Education: Bryant & Stratton's Commercial College
- Profession: Financial Manager

Charles V. Blanchard (February 2, 1866 – February 20, 1939) was an American politician who served as a Massachusetts State Representative and as a Massachusetts State Senator.

While he was a member of the Massachusetts House Blanchard developed a close friendship with Calvin Coolidge. Blanchard, it was rumored, taught Coolidge how to properly dress for various occasions.

Blanchard did not seek reëlection to the senate in 1913. Blanchard was replaced by Charles W. Eldridge for the 1914 legislative term.

Blanchard worked for many years for the N. E. Tel & Tel Co.

Blanchard had a heart attack and died while he was on a trip to Florida, where he had gone to spend the winter.

== See also ==
- 131st Massachusetts General Court (1910)
- 134th Massachusetts General Court (1913)

== Notes ==
Political offices
Preceded by Elmer A. Stevens	Member of the Massachusetts Senate; Third Middlesex District; 1910 – January 1914	Succeeded by Charles W. Eldridge
