= S. Lester Ralph =

American clergyman, attorney, and politician (1931–2019)

Mayor of Somerville, Massachusetts
- In office 1970–1978
- Preceded by: James F. Brennan
- Succeeded by: Thomas F. August

Personal details
- Born: 1931 Lynn, Massachusetts
- Died: August 20, 2019 (aged 88) Reading, Massachusetts
- Party: Democratic (1969–1982); Republican (1982–2019)
- Education: Boston University; Boston University School of Law; Virginia Theological Seminary
- Occupation: Minister; Lawyer; Mayor

S. Lester Ralph (1931 – 2019) was an American clergyman, attorney, and politician who served as mayor of Somerville, Massachusetts from 1970 to 1978 and Middlesex County Commissioner from 1973 to 1981.

== Early life ==
Ralph was born in Lynn, Massachusetts in 1931. He earned a bachelor's degree, a master's degree, and a Law degree from Boston University and a Master of Divinity Degree from the Virginia Theological Seminary. In 1964 he became the rector of the Christ Episcopal Church in West Somerville. He also had a law office in Waltham, Massachusetts.

== Political career ==
=== Mayor ===
In 1969, Ralph ran for Mayor of Somerville. A political novice who had never run for office before, Ralph topped the ticket in the preliminary election with 49% of the vote. Incumbent mayor James F. Brennan finished third with 23%, making it the first time in 50 years that an incumbent Mayor had lost in the preliminary election. In the general election, Ralph defeated former clerk of the Somerville district court Joseph Marino 75% to 25%. During his first term, many of Ralph's programs were rejected by the board of aldermen. However, he was able to implement a competitive bidding process for supplies in services, which resulted in the city's first revenue surplus in 10 years. Ralph allowed the Boston Globe to investigate the city's contracts and the paper's Spotlight Team found that between 1960 and 1970, the administrations of the previous three mayors had channeled $4.3 million in no-bid and split contracts to five contractors. That August, three previous mayors, the retired public works commissioner, and the city auditor were indicted for conspiracy and larceny. The Spotlight team won the Pulitzer Prize for Local Investigative Specialized Reporting for their reporting of corruption in Somerville. In 1971, Ralph defeated state representative Maria Howe 65% to 35% to win reelection. During his tenure as Mayor, the city built new schools and fire stations and renovated libraries. He worked to bring the Red Line to the city, which helped revitalize Davis Square. In 1972, Somerville won the All-America City Award.

In 1973 he was reelected over former Somerville Housing Authority Executive Director Edward Sweeney. In 1975, Ralph narrowly defeated Thomas F. August for reelection. He did not run for reelection in 1977 and August defeated Ralph's preferred successor Eugene C. Brune.

=== County commission ===
In 1972, Ralph and Paul Tsongas were elected to the Middlesex County Commission as reform candidates. Ralph continued to serve as mayor while on the commission. In 1980, he was defeated for reelection by Thomas J. Larkin by 14,000 votes.

=== Bids for higher office ===
In 1974, Ralph ran for Massachusetts Attorney General. He finished fourth in the Democratic primary with 12% of the vote. In 1978, he ran for Middlesex County treasurer as an independent. He was defeated by incumbent Rocco J. Antonelli by more than a 2 to 1 margin. In 1982, Ralph, who had become disillusioned by the Massachusetts Democratic Party, became a Republican. In 1984 he challenged incumbent representative Ed Markey for the 7th congressional district seat. Markey defeated Ralph 71% to 29%.

== Later life ==
A few years after leaving the Mayor's office, Ralph and his family moved to Reading, Massachusetts. He continued to practice law, representing clergy accused of sexual harassment. One of his clients was Rev. James R. Hiles, vicar of the Church of Our Savior in Milton, Massachusetts who was accused by a former church employee of engaging in a five-year sexual affair with her that ended with an abortion. Ralph died on August 20, 2019, at his home in Reading. He was 88 years old.
