= Albion A. Perry =

American politician (1851-1933)

Albion Atwood Perry
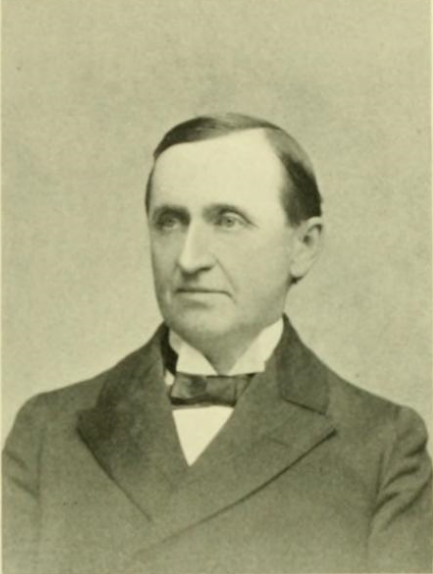

9th Mayor of Somerville, Massachusetts
- In office January 6, 1896 – 1898
- Preceded by: William H. Hodgkins
- Succeeded by: George O. Proctor

President of the Somerville, Massachusetts Water Board
- In office 1891–1892

Member of the Somerville, Massachusetts Board of Aldermen
- In office 1883–1884

Member of the Somerville, Massachusetts Common Council
- In office 1881–1882

Member of the Somerville, Massachusetts Common Council
- In office 1881–1882

President of the Somerville, Massachusetts School Committee
- In office 1896–1898

Member of the Somerville, Massachusetts School Committee
- In office 1876–1876
- In office 1882–1882
- In office 1896–1898

Personal details
- Born: January 26, 1851 Standish, Maine
- Died: February 1933 Winter Park, Florida
- Party: Republican
- Spouse(s): Mary Ellen Brooks, m. December 31, 1874, d. January 10, 1904; Virginia Blair Means, m. April 11, 1907.
- Education: Boston University School of Law
- Profession: Lawyer, Banker

Albion Atwood Perry (January 26, 1851 – February 1933) was an American politician who served on the water board, school committee, on both branches of the Somerville city council and as the ninth Mayor, of Somerville, Massachusetts.

== Early life ==
Perry was born to Rev. John Curtis and Mary Elizabeth (Baston) Perry in Standish, Maine on January 26, 1851.

== Family ==
Perry married Mary Ellen Brooks on December 31, 1874. On January 8, 1904 Mary was fatally injured in a fire, she died On January 8, 1904.

== Notes ==
Political offices
Preceded by William H. Hodgkins	9th Mayor of Somerville, Massachusetts; January 6, 1896–1898	Succeeded by George O. Proctor
