= Timeline of Somerville, Massachusetts =

Coordinates: 42.3875°N 71.1°W

The following is a timeline of the history of Somerville, Massachusetts, US.

== Prior to 19th century ==
- 1630 - Charlestown settled.
- 1631 - Colonial Governor John Winthrop granted 600 acres of land known as Ten Hills Farm.
- 1703 - Windmill built (approximate date).
- 1714 - Peter Tufts House built.
- 1756 - Powder House in use.
- 1776 - Continental Union Flag raised at Continental Army fortifications atop Prospect Hill.

== 19th century ==
=== 1800s–1860s ===
- 1803 - Middlesex Canal begins in operation.
- 1804 - Old Cemetery established.
- 1821 - Middlesex Bleachery and Dye Works established.
- 1834 - Ursuline Convent Riots.
- 1835 - Boston & Lowell Railroad begins operating.
- 1842
  - Town of Somerville separates from Charlestown.
  - Population: 1,013.
- 1844 - First Congregational Society formed.
- 1851 - American Tube Works established.
- 1852
  - Somerville City Hall built.
  - Somerville High School opens.
- 1853
  - First Orthodox Congregational Church organized.
  - First Universalist Society organized.
- 1854
  - Tufts College opens.
  - Union Glass Company established.
- 1856
  - First Methodist Episcopal Church organized.
  - Round House built.
- 1863 - Broadway Orthodox Congregational Church organized.
- 1864 - Circulating Library in business at Tufts' apothecary (approximate date).
- 1866
  - Emmanuel Episcopal Church built.
  - Somerville Carriage Repository and Manufactory established.
- 1867 - Perkins Street Baptist Church dedicated.
- 1869 - Morse Grammar School built.

=== 1870s–1890s ===
- 1870
  - Somerville Journal newspaper begins publication.
  - St. Thomas Episcopal Church built.
  - Boston and Lowell Railroad connected through West Somerville to the Lexington Branch.
- 1871
  - City incorporated.
  - Somerville Samaritan Society organized.
- 1872
  - Somerville city government inaugurated.
  - City seal design adopted.
  - Population: 16,000 (approximate).
- 1873
  - Public Library established.
  - Luther V. Bell School built.
  - Broadway Methodist Episcopal Church organized.
- 1874
  - West Somerville Baptist Church organized.
  - West Somerville Congregational Church organized.
  - Sprague & Hathaway Portrait Copying House established.
- 1876 - Somerville Citizen newspaper begins publication.
- 1886 - Third Universalist Church established.
- 1890
  - Broadway Winter Hill Congregational Church built.
  - North Packing Company established.
  - Population: 40,152.
- 1891 - Somerville Hospital founded.
- 1892 - McLean Hospital relocates to Belmont.
- 1898
  - Somerville Historical Society incorporated.
  - Historic Festival.
- 1899
  - Forthian Club for women organized.
  - First Unitarian Church built.
- 1900 - Population: 61,643.

== 20th century ==
- 1901 - Lyndell's Bakery relocates to Somerville.
- 1903 - Prospect Hill Monument built.
- 1909 - West Somerville Branch Public Library opens.
- 1910 - Population: 77,236.
- 1914
  - Somerville Theatre built.
  - Public Library central building constructed.
  - Economy Grocery Store opens.
- 1915 - Pageant of World Peace.
- 1916 - First Universalist Church built.
- 1922
  - 50th anniversary as city.
  - Population: 95,000 (approximate).
- 1928 - Northern Artery constructed.
- 1935 - United States Post Office–Somerville Main built.
- 1936 - Mystic Valley Parkway constructed.
- 1941 - The Rosebud (diner) built.
- 1968 - Havurat Shalom founded.
- 1972 - City seal redesigned.
- 1973 - Steve's Ice Cream opens.
- 1980 - Assembly Square Mall opens.
- 1981
  - Sister city relationship established with Trincomalee, Sri Lanka.
  - Bertucci's pizzeria opens.
- 1983 - Somerville Community Access Television founded.
- 1984 - Davis (MBTA station) opens.
- 1985 - Alewife Linear Park established.
- 1987
  - Brickbottom Artists Association active.
  - Mixit Print Studio established.
  - Joseph P. Kennedy II becomes U.S. representative for Massachusetts's 8th congressional district.
- 1988 - Somerville Museum opens.
- 1990 - Mike Capuano becomes mayor.
- 1991 - Candlewick Press established.
- 1998 - City website online (approximate date).
- 1999
  - Dorothy Kelly Gay becomes mayor.
  - Leverett Circle Connector Bridge opens.
  - Somerville Open Studios begins.
  - Mike Capuano becomes U.S. representative for Massachusetts's 8th congressional district.

== 21st century ==
- 2002 - P.A.'s Lounge opens.
- 2003
  - Won-Buddhist temple opens.
  - GreenGoat in business.
- 2004 - Joseph Curtatone becomes mayor.
- 2005
  - Union Square Main Streets organized.
  - Union Square farmers' market begins.
  - Sikh Sangat Society Boston and Harry Potter Alliance headquartered in Somerville.
- 2006 - Honk! music festival begins.
- 2007 - Highland Kitchen restaurant in business.
- 2009 - Sister city relationship established with Tiznit, Morocco.
- 2010
  - Population: 75,754.
  - Sister city relationship established with Nordeste, Portugal.
- 2014
  - Legoland in business.
  - Assembly station opens.
- 2022
  - Katjana Ballantyne becomes mayor.
  - Union Square station opens.
  - The remaining Medford branch of the Green Line Extension opens later in the year.
- 2026 - Jake Wilson becomes mayor.

== See also ==
- History of Somerville
- List of mayors of Somerville, Massachusetts
- National Register of Historic Places listings in Somerville, Massachusetts
- Charlestown, Massachusetts (from which Somerville sprang in 1842)
- Timelines of other municipalities in Middlesex County, Massachusetts: Cambridge, Lowell, Waltham

== Bibliography ==
- Somerville, Arlington and Belmont Directory: 1869-70. Boston, Mass.: Dudley & Greenough. 1869.
- Somerville City Directory for 1873. Boston: Greenough, Jones & Co. 1873.
- Somerville City Directory for 1875-6. Boston: Greenough & Co. 1875.
- Somerville City Directory for 1883. Boston: Greenough & Co. 1883.
- Somerville City Directory. Boston: Greenough & Co. 1884.
- Edward A. Samuels, ed.; Henry H. Kimball, ed. (1897), Somerville, past and present: an illustrated historical souvenir commemorative of the twenty-fifth anniversary of the establishment of the city government of Somerville, Massachusetts, Boston: Samuels and Kimball, OL 13439695M
- Barbara Galpin (1901), Publication, no. 1: History of Somerville Journalism; with a list of members, officers, and committees of the Somerville Historical Society, Somerville, Mass: Somerville Historical Society, OL 14036554M
- M. A. Haley (1903), Story of Somerville, Boston: Writer Publishing Co., OL 23342477M
- "Somerville (Massachusetts)" . Encyclopædia Britannica. Vol. 25 (11th ed.). 1910. pp. 391–392.
- Fiftieth Anniversary of the City of Somerville, Somerville: Somerville Journal Print, 1922, OL 14007850M
- Federal Writers' Project (1937), "Somerville", Massachusetts: a Guide to its Places and People, American Guide Series, Boston: Houghton Mifflin, hdl:2027/mdp.39015014440781
- Reed Ueda (1984). "The High School and Social Mobility in a Streetcar Suburb: Somerville, Massachusetts, 1870-1910". Journal of Interdisciplinary History. 14.
- "Out of the Shadow of Boston and Cambridge", New York Times, October 2, 2014

== Images ==
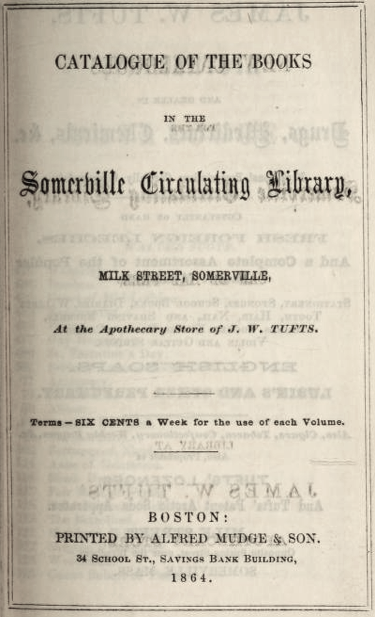
Somerville Circulating Library, Milk Street, 1860s

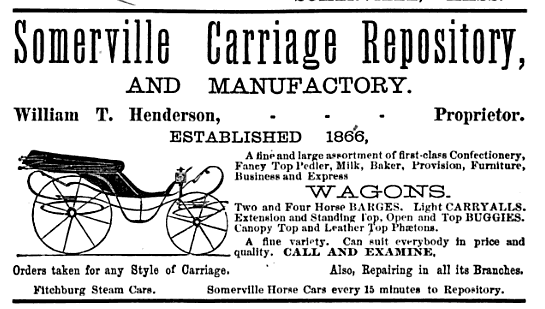
Somerville Carriage Repository, est. 1866 (advertisement from 1883)

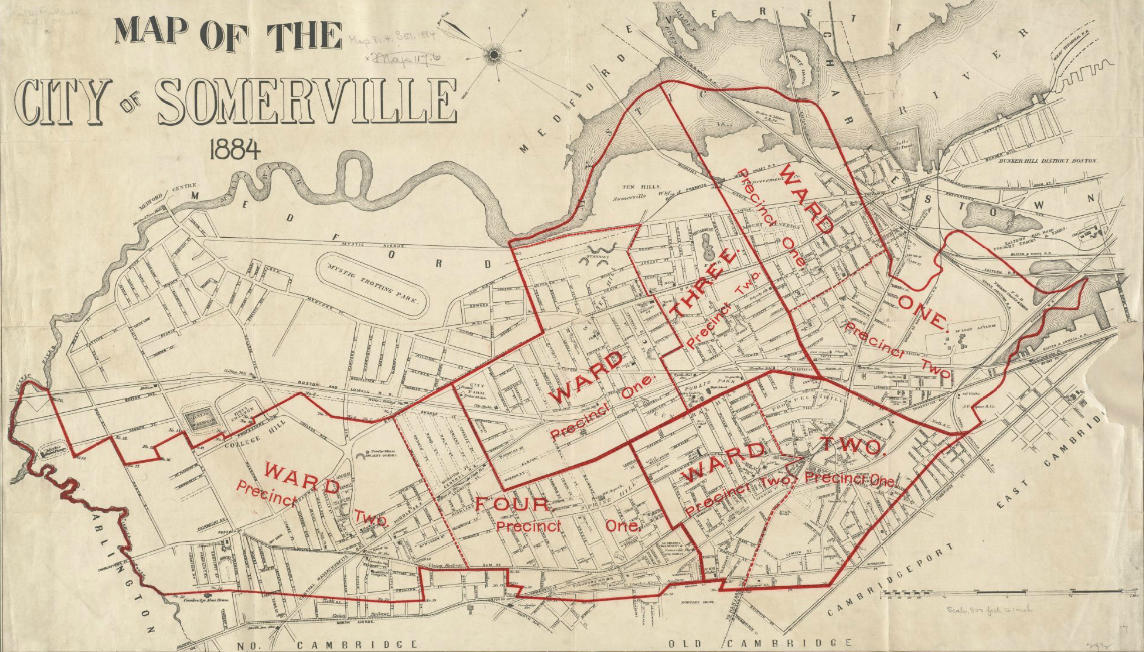
Map of Somerville, 1884

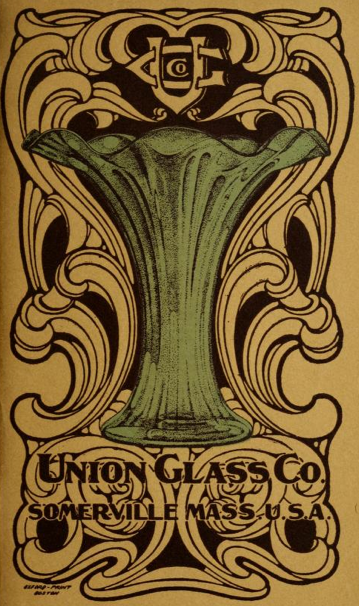
Union Glass Co., est. 1854 (cover of catalog, c. 1911)

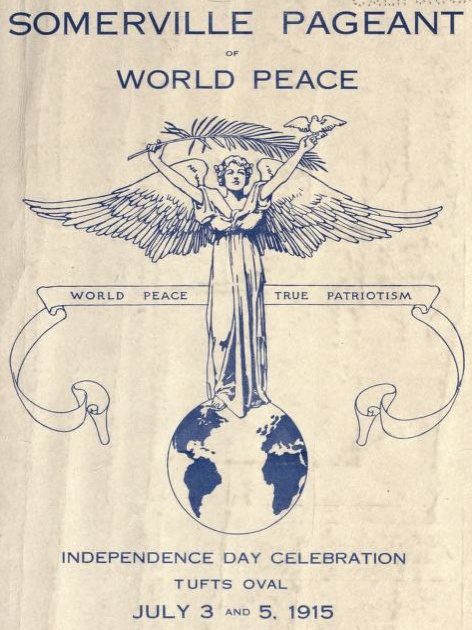
Somerville Pageant of World Peace, July 1915
