= Charles Adams-Woodbury Locke House =

Historic house in Massachusetts, United States

- Charles Adams - Woodbury Locke House
- U.S. National Register of Historic Places
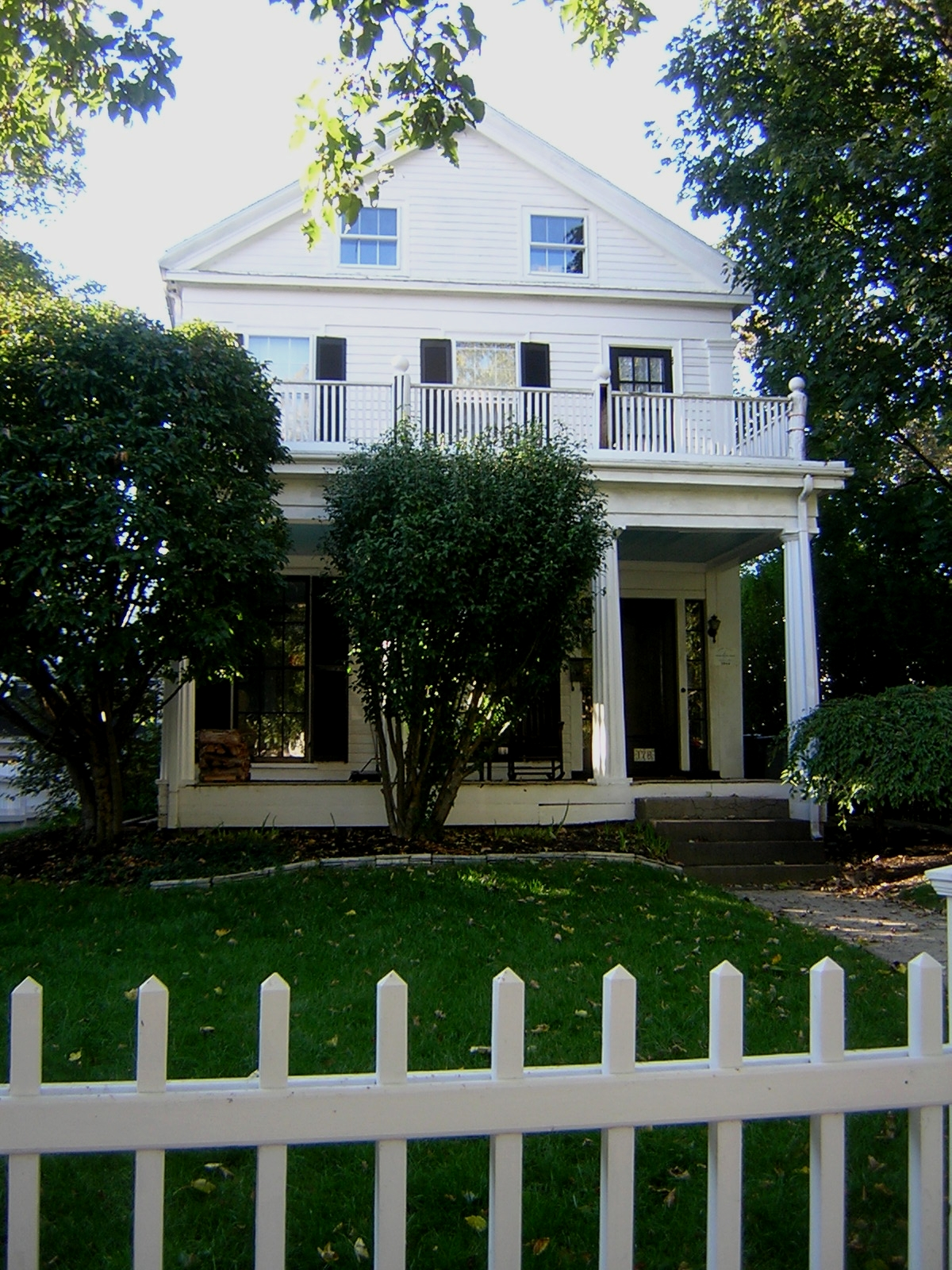

- Location within Massachusetts Location within the United States
- Location: 178 Central Street, Somerville, Massachusetts
- Coordinates: 42°23′38.7″N 71°5′59″W
- Area: less than one acre
- Built: 1840
- Architectural style: Greek Revival
- MPS: Somerville MPS
- NRHP reference No.: 89001240
- Added to NRHP: September 18, 1989

The Charles Adams-Woodbury Locke House is a historic house in Somerville, Massachusetts. The Greek Revival house was built about 1840 for a Boston leather merchant and was one of the first residences of a commuter, rather than a farmer, in the Winter Hill neighborhood of the city. The house was listed on the National Register of Historic Places in 1989.

== Description and history ==
The Adams House is located on the west side of Central Street, a short way south of Broadway, the major roadway that passes over Winter Hill. It is a 2 1/2-story wood-frame structure, three bays wide, with a front-facing gable roof and clapboard siding. The building has wide corner boards and a broad entablature, and the gable is fully pedimented. A single-story porch extends across the front, supported by Doric columns, with a balustrade above. The main entrance is in the right-most bay, flanked by sidelight windows. The interior has retained much of its original woodwork.

Built about 1840, the house is a fine local example of Greek Revival architecture. Its original parcel of land (now subdivided into residential plots), extended from Broadway to Medford Street. Charles Adams was a farmer, state legislator, and one of the first tenants of Boston's Quincy Market. Adams gave land for a schoolhouse on Broadway (now the site of the Winter Hill Congregational Church). Woodbury Locke, a later resident, was involved in the leather business in Boston.

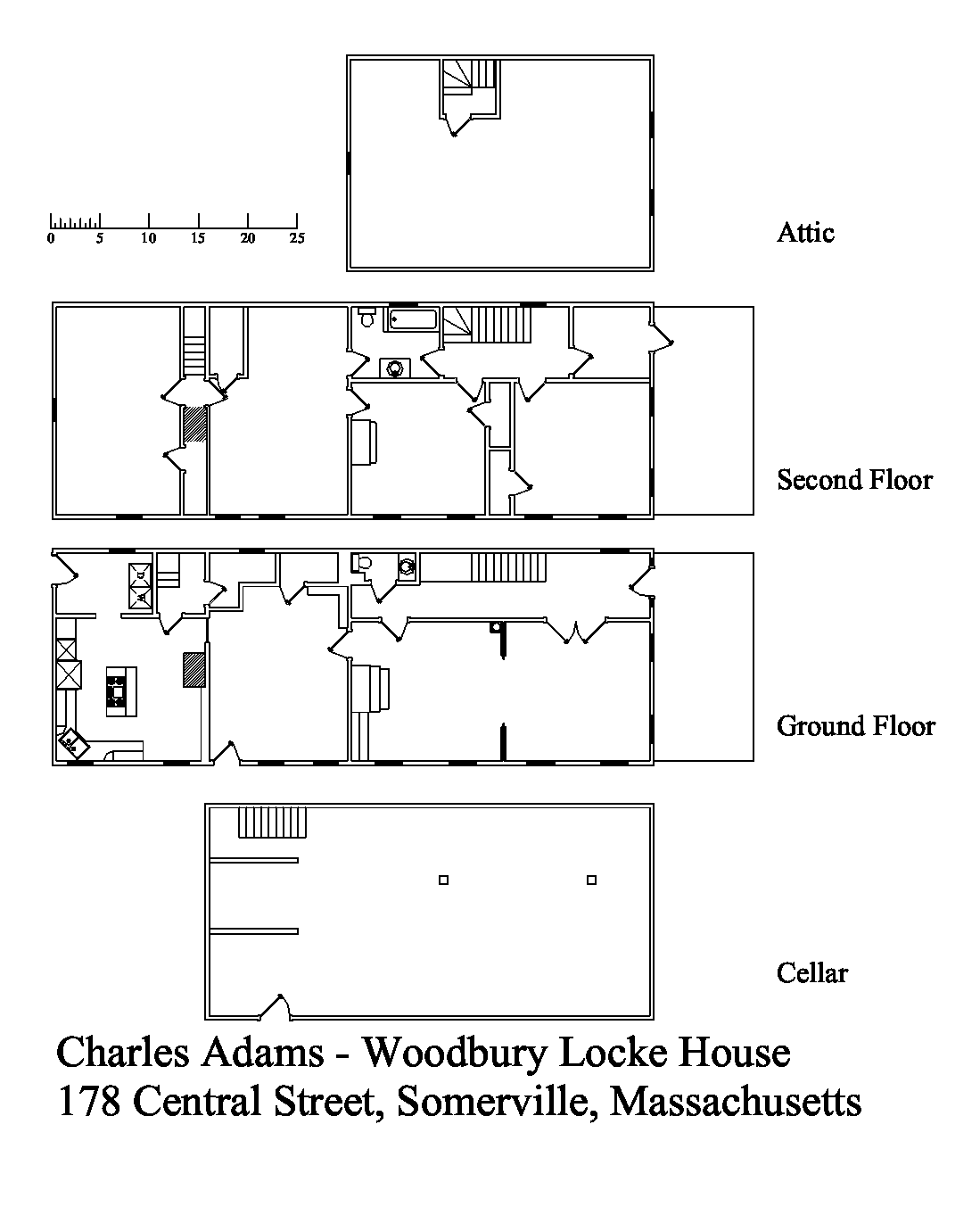
Floor plans as of 1993

== See also ==
- National Register of Historic Places listings in Somerville, Massachusetts
