= Langmaid Terrace =

Historic house in Massachusetts, United States

- U.S. National Register of Historic Places
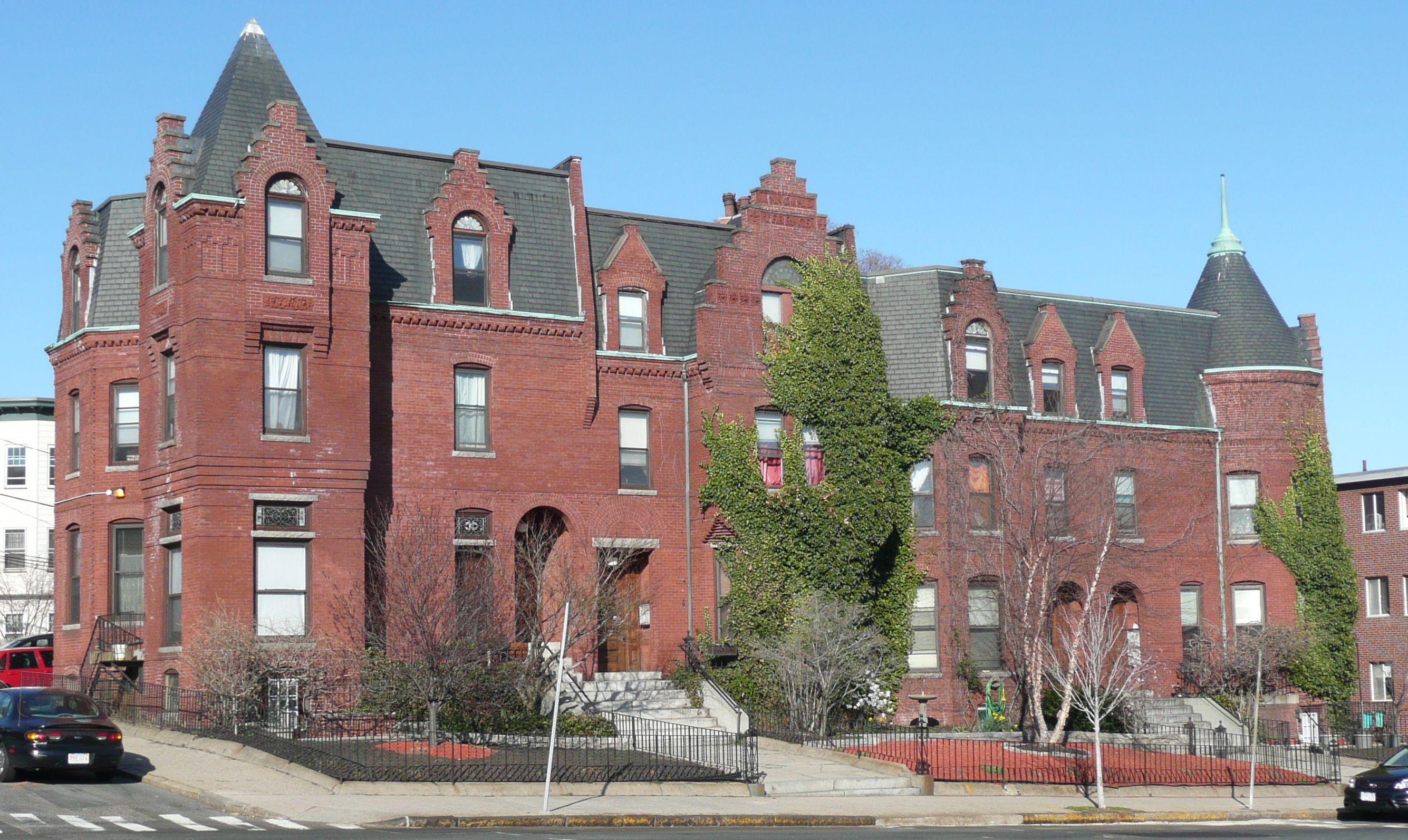

- Location within Massachusetts Location within the United States
- Location: Somerville, Massachusetts
- Coordinates: 42°23′38.5″N 71°5′44.7″W
- Built: 1891
- Architect: J. Pickering Putnam
- Architectural style: Queen Anne
- MPS: Somerville MPS
- NRHP reference No.: 89001237
- Added to NRHP: September 18, 1989

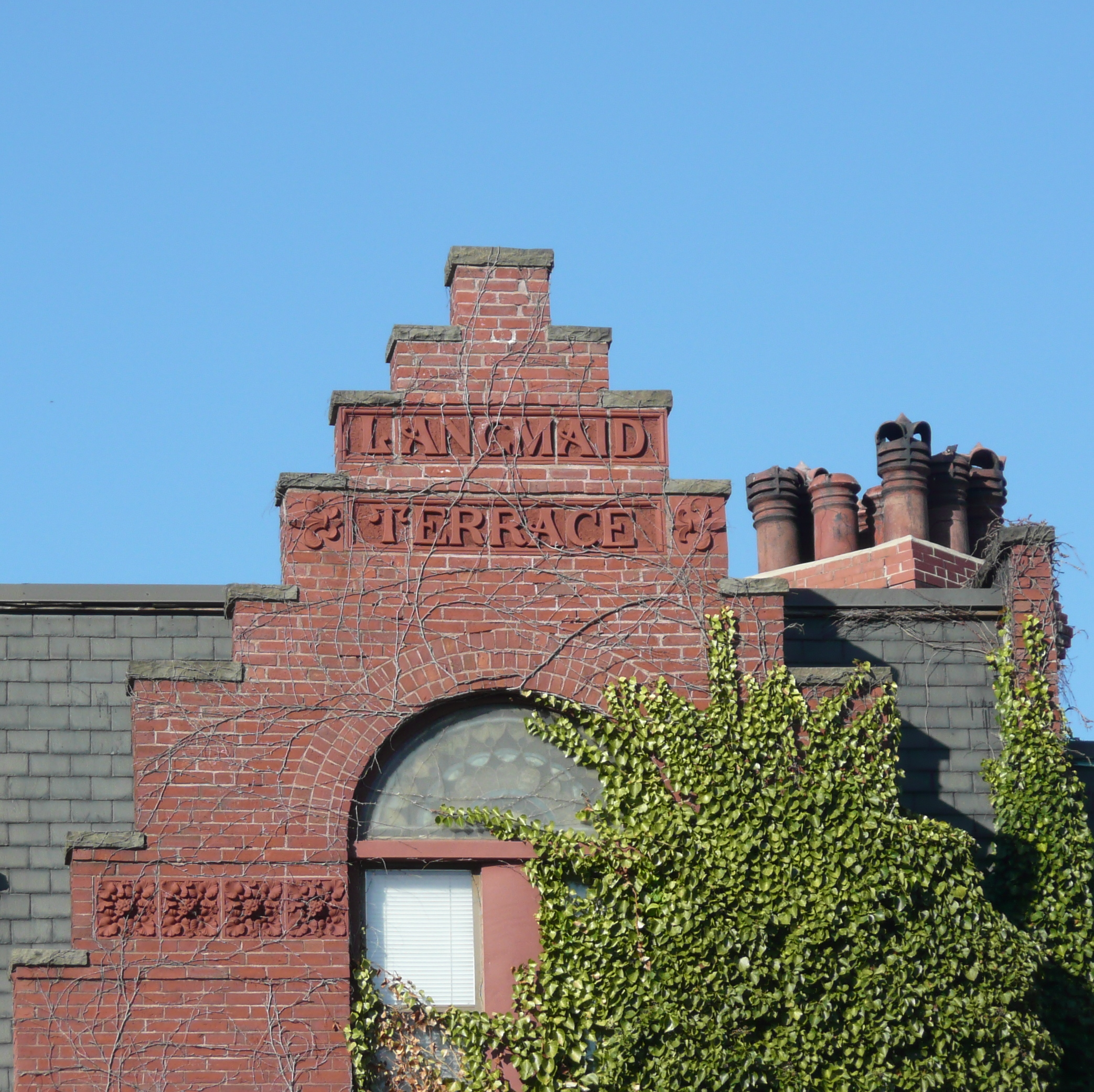
The identifying sign on the face of the Langmaid Terrace

Langmaid Terrace is a historic apartment complex at 359—365 Broadway in the Winter Hill neighborhood of Somerville, Massachusetts. The architecturally eclectic brick building was built in 1891 by the heirs of Samuel P. Langmaid, a local landowner. The Langmaid family was also responsible for the Langmaid Building on Highland Avenue. The architect was J. Pickering Putnam of Boston. The building is Queen Anne in inspiration with multiple roof lines, gables, and towers of varying heights and styles. Dormers project from the mansard roof, faced with stepped brick.

The building was listed on the National Register of Historic Places in 1989.

Since 2009, the end unit at 365 Broadway has received notice as the residence of Barack Obama from 1988 to 1991 while he attended Harvard Law School.

In 2021, a granite marker commemorating Obama's residency was placed in the front garden area, deemed the President Obama Rose Garden At Winter Hill, MA.

== See also ==
- National Register of Historic Places listings in Somerville, Massachusetts
