= Jake Wilson =

Mayor of Somerville, Massachusetts since 2026

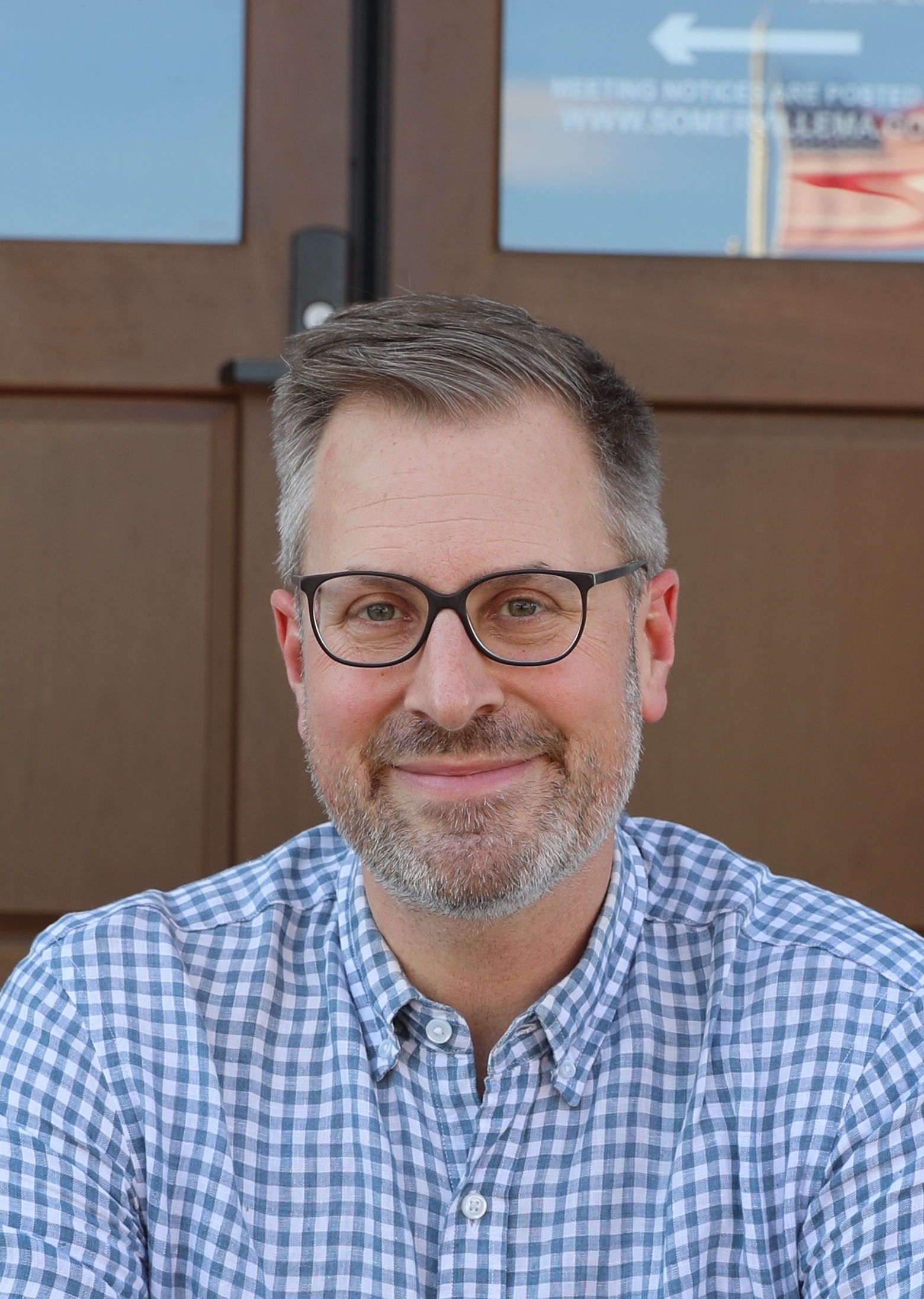
- Wilson in 2025

37th Mayor of Somerville
- Incumbent
- Assumed office January 2, 2026
- Preceded by: Katjana Ballantyne

Personal details
- Born: Jacob D. Wilson; 1977 (age 48–49) Minnesota, U.S.
- Spouse: Catherine Evans
- Children: 2
- Education: University of Pennsylvania (B.A.)
- Website: www.jakeforsomerville.org

Jake Wilson (born 1977) is an American politician who has served as the 37th mayor of Somerville, Massachusetts since January 2, 2026. Wilson had previously served as an at-large member of the Somerville City Council between January 2022 and January 2026.

== Early life and education ==
Wilson was born in the Twin Cities. He and his family moved to a family farm in Iowa two years after he was born. He later earned his B.A. in English at the University of Pennsylvania in 1999.

== Career ==
From 1997 to 2001, Wilson worked in Technology consulting and advisory services. From 2001 to 2006, he worked as a Journalist. In 2018, Wilson became president of Somerville Youth Soccer, and held that position until 2021. Before becoming president of the organization, Wilson was the communications director, and also coached for the organization

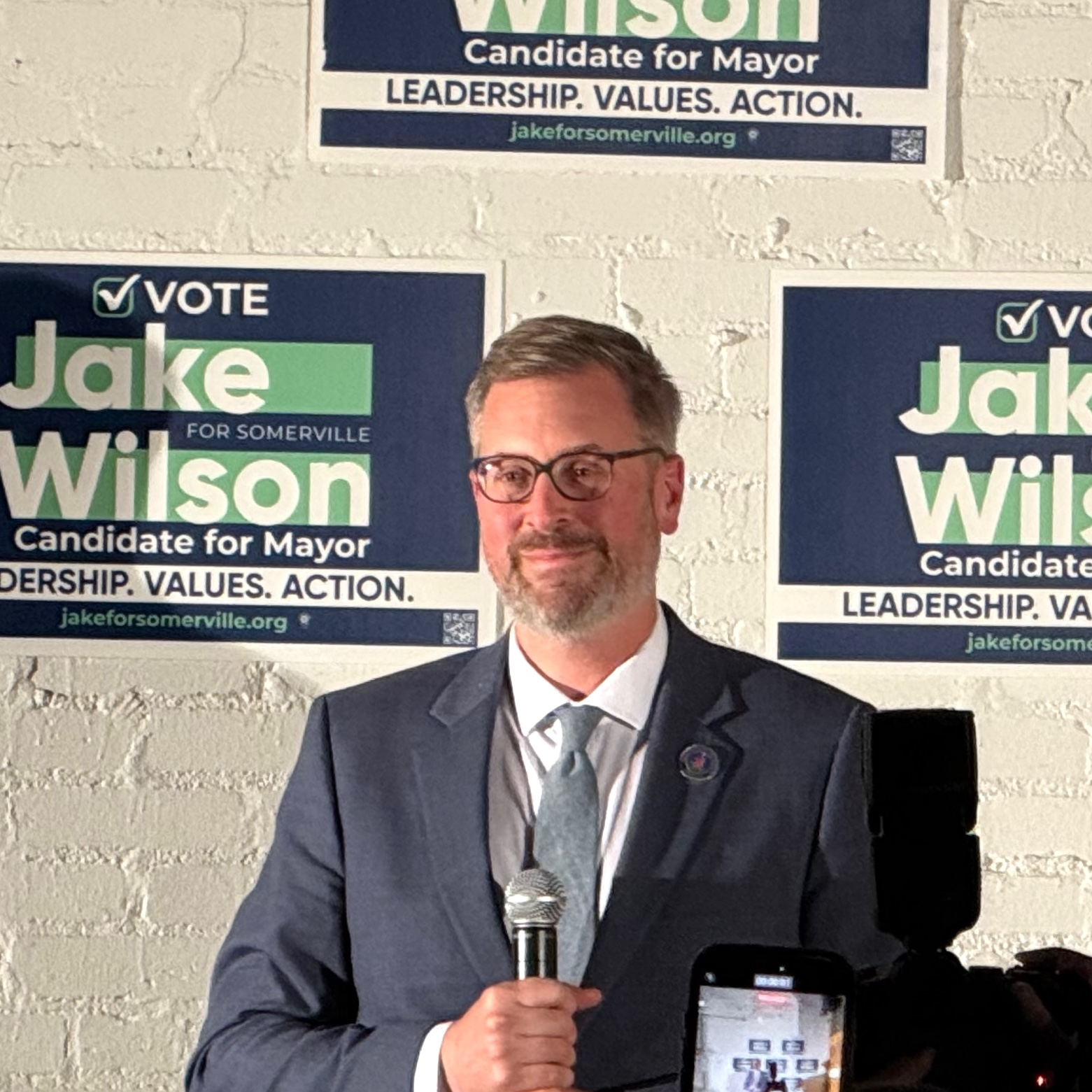
Wilson speaking at his mayoral election party

After several Somerville at-large City Councillors announced their retirement from the council, Wilson ran for one of the four at-large seats in 2021. He won with 7,067 votes. In 2023 he successfully ran for reelection.

On December 16, 2024, Wilson announced his candidacy for mayor, challenging incumbent Katjana Ballantyne. Ballantyne was eliminated in the September 2025 preliminary election, and Wilson won the November 2025 municipal election. Wilson won with the most votes in both elections.

Wilson was sworn in as mayor on January 2, 2026.

== Personal life ==
Wilson married his wife in 2002. They have two children and live in the Somerville neighborhood of Winter Hill.

== Electoral history ==
=== City Council ===
2021 Somerville City Council election (At-large)
Candidate	Municipal election	
Candidate	Votes	%
Kristen Strezo	10,314	17.8
Willie Burnley, Jr.	9,735	16.8
Charlotte Kelly	9,700	16.7
Jake Wilson	7,067	12.2
Eve Seitchik	6,478	11.2
Justin Klekota	5,532	9.5
Tracey Leah Pratt	5,113	8.8
Virginia Hussey	3,869	6.7
Write-in	308	0.5
Total	58,116	100

2023 Somerville City Council election (At-large)
Candidate	Municipal election	
Candidate	Votes	%
Kristen Strezo (incumbent)	11,993	21.9
Willie Burnley, Jr. (incumbent)	11,344	20.7
Will Mbah	11,088	20.2
Jake Wilson (incumbent)	10,909	19.9
Charlotte Kelly (incumbent)	9,032	16.5
Write-in	448	0.8
Total	54,814	100

=== Mayor ===
2025 Somerville mayoral election
Candidate	Preliminary election		Municipal election	
Candidate	Votes	%	Votes	%
Jake Wilson	5,190	42.1	11,294	55.1
Willie Burnley, Jr.	4,174	33.9	9,144	44.6
Katjana Ballantyne (incumbent)	2,927	23.7		
Write-in	40	0.3	59	0.3
Total	12,331	100	20,497	100
