= Downer Rowhouses =

Historic houses in Massachusetts, United States

- U.S. National Register of Historic Places
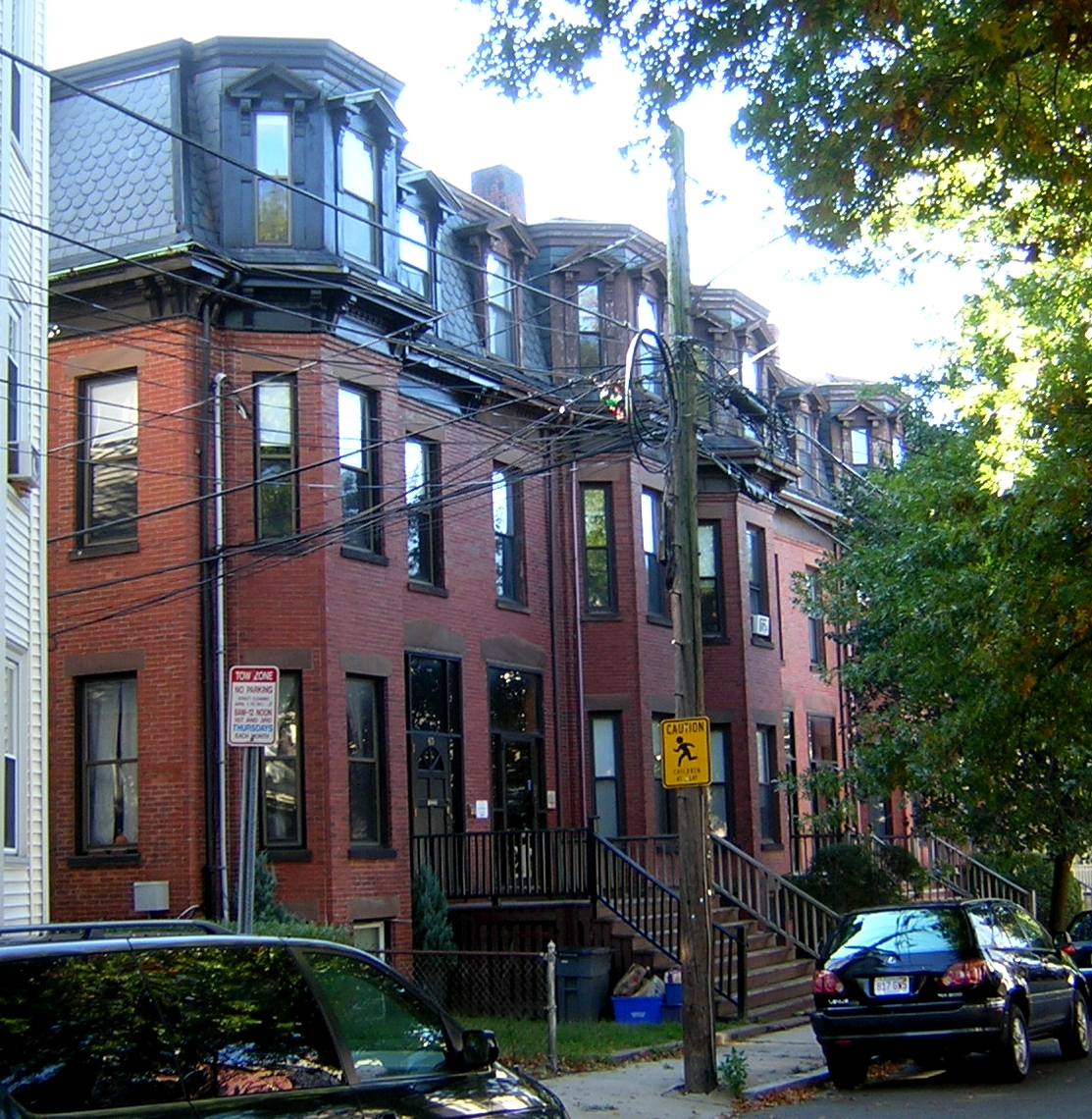
- The Adams Street building.

- Location within Massachusetts Location within the United States
- Location: 55 Adams St., 192-200 Central St., Somerville, Massachusetts
- Coordinates: 42°23′42″N 71°5′58″W
- Area: less than one acre
- Built: 1880
- Architectural style: Second Empire
- MPS: Somerville MPS
- NRHP reference No.: 89001225
- Added to NRHP: September 18, 1989

The Downer Rowhouses are two sets of Second Empire row houses that are back to back at 55 Adams Street and 192–200 Central Street, Somerville, Massachusetts. Built c. 1880, they are among the first buildings of their type built in the city. The two groups were separately listed on the National Register of Historic Places on September 18, 1989, as Downer Rowhouses (Central Street) and Downer Rowhouses (Adams Street).

== Description and history ==
Both sets of rowhouses are set on residential streets just south of Broadway, the major thoroughfare through the Winter Hill neighborhood of Somerville. They each consist of five essentially identical (or mirror-image) residences, 2 1/2 stories in height, with a full third floor under their steeply pitched mansard roofs. Each unit is two bays wide, with the left side a full-height polygonal bay, with narrow side windows and a larger center window. At the mansard level the windows are set under gables; otherwise the windows have brownstone lintels and sills. The entrances are on the right side. They have patterned slate roofs.

When these rowhouses were built c. 1880, Winter Hill was a fashionable residential area, populated by large two and three-family houses on generously sized lots. These buildings, among the first rowhouses built in the city, were built by Cutler Downer, a local real estate developer. Similar rowhouses, not as well-preserved as these, were built in a few places elsewhere in the city, notably on Prospect Hill and Spring Hill.

== Gallery ==
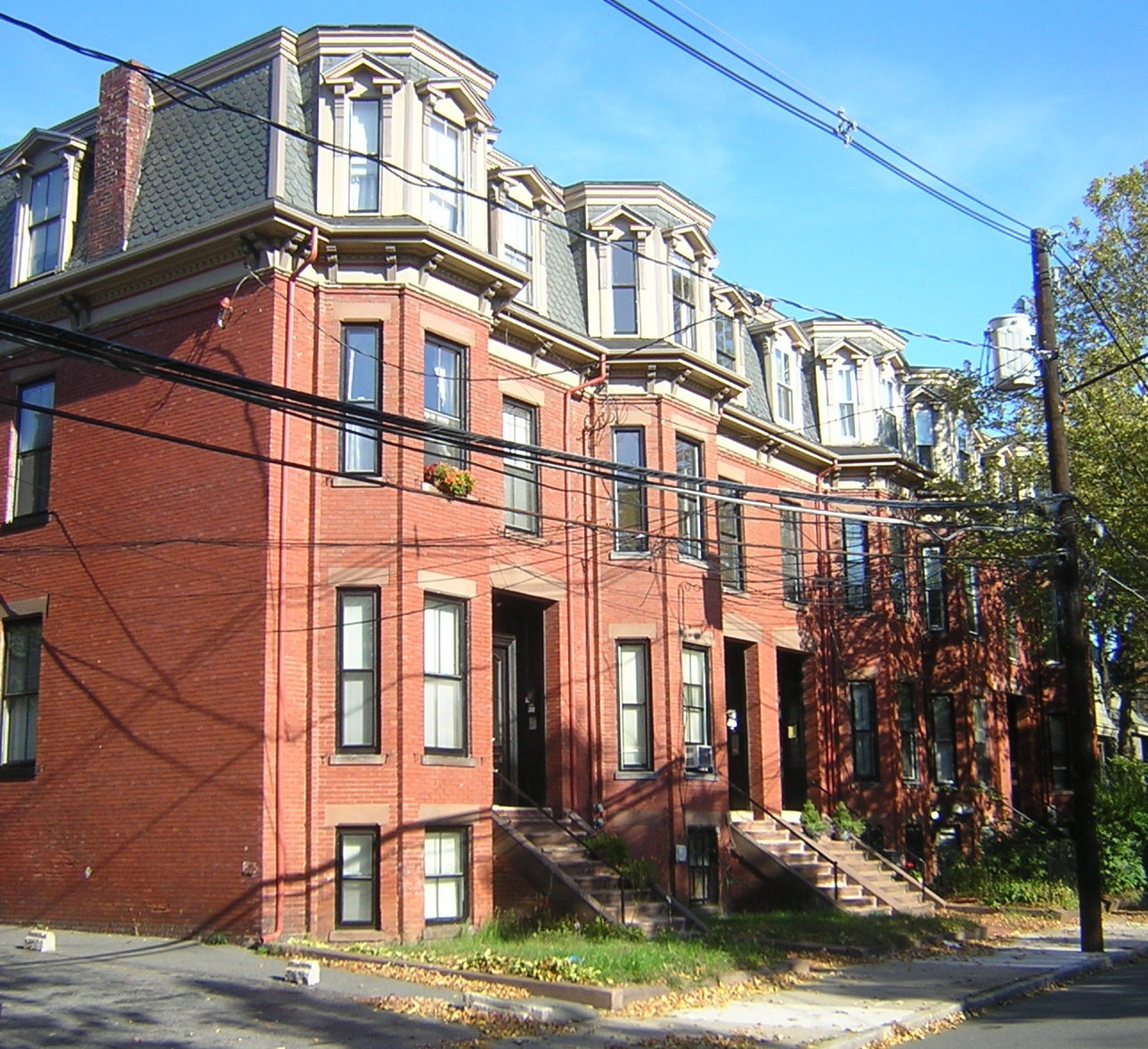
Central Street

== See also ==
- National Register of Historic Places listings in Somerville, Massachusetts
