= Langmaid Building =

- U.S. National Register of Historic Places
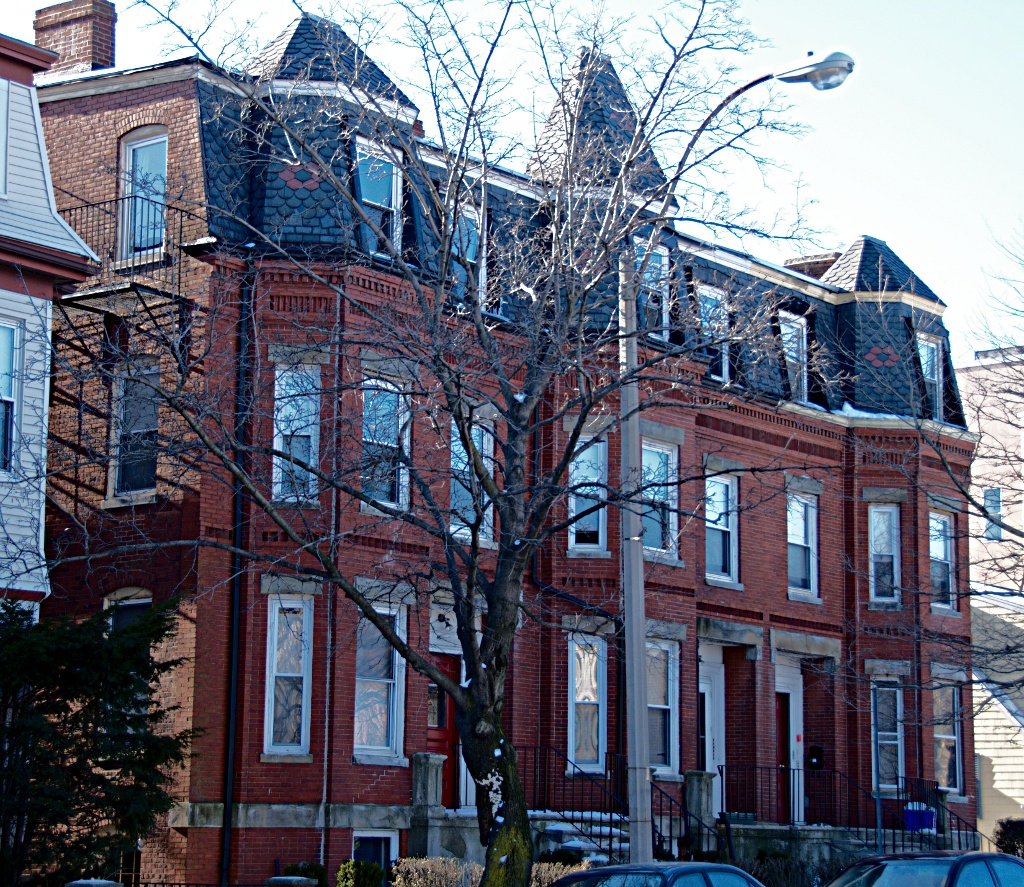

- Location within Massachusetts Location within the United States
- Location: 48–52 Highland Avenue, Somerville, Massachusetts
- Coordinates: 42°23′7.62″N 71°5′43.66″W
- Architectural style: Second Empire
- MPS: Somerville MPS
- NRHP reference No.: 89001259
- Added to NRHP: September 18, 1989

The Langmaid Building is a historic multiunit residence building in Somerville, Massachusetts, USA. The brick rowhouse was one of several Second Empire multiunit buildings built in the late 1870s and early 1880s by Samuel Langmaid and other members of his family. This particular series of units has decorative panel brick insets, and the characteristic slate mansard roof. This building was the first to be built of brick in the area, marking a shift away from wood-frame construction that dominated the area.

The building was listed on the National Register of Historic Places in 1989.

== See also ==
- Langmaid Terrace, on Broadway
- The Highland, also built by the Langmaids
- National Register of Historic Places listings in Somerville, Massachusetts
