= J. Pickering Putnam =

American architect and designer

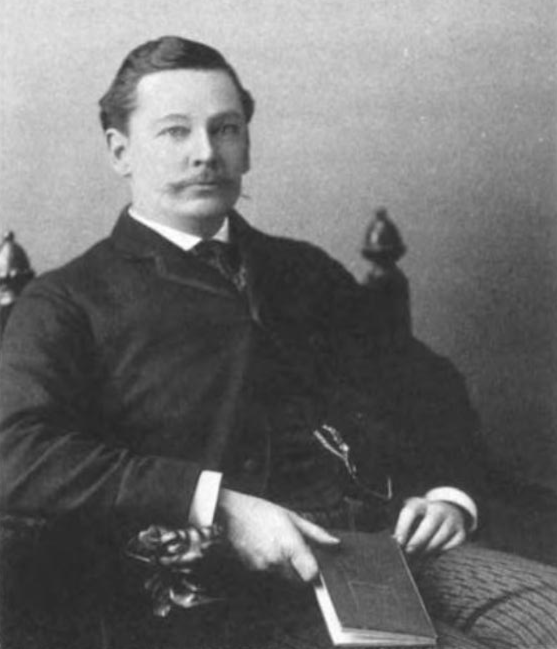
- Born: John Amory Putnam; April 3, 1847; Boston, Massachusetts
- Died: February 23, 1917 (aged 69); Boston, Massachusetts
- Education: Harvard College
- Occupation: Architect
- Spouse: Grace Cornelia Stevens (m. 1885)
- Children: 2

J. Pickering Putnam (April 3, 1847 – February 23, 1917), also known as J. P. Putnam or John Pickering Putnam, was an American architect and designer who "pioneered the concept of the modern apartment building." He designed several buildings in the Back Bay area of Boston, Massachusetts. He earned a number of design patents related to plumbing, ventilation, and the like, such as US Patent No.563,064 (1896), a design for a washbasin.

== Brief biography ==
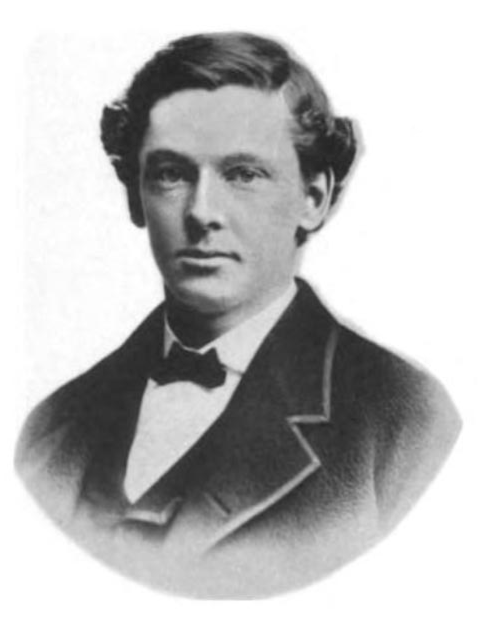
At Harvard, c. 1868

Putnam was born as "John Amory Putnam" in Boston in 1847, to John Pickering Putnam (1813-1867) and Harriet Upham (1820-1905). He was one of four children; his siblings were Mary Upham Putnam (1843-1920); Harriet Putnam (b. 1845); and Sarah Gooll Putnam (1851-1912), a painter.

Putnam graduated from the Boston Latin School, and from Harvard College in 1868. He then trained at the École des Beaux-Arts, Paris, in 1869, and the Royal Academy of Architecture, Berlin, 1870-1872. "The war interrupted his studies. Leaving Paris for Berlin, he was twice arrested as a Prussian spy, while sketching in the streets."

On returning to the US in 1872 he began practicing architecture and was associated professionally with George Thomas Tilden. In 1885 Putnam married Grace Cornelia Stevens; they had 2 children: Grace Elizabeth Putnam (b. 1887) and John Pickering Putnam Jr. (b. 1892). He was a member of the Boston Society of Architects; St. Botolph Club; Portfolio Club of Boston; and The Cold Cut Club of Boston.

He died at the Charlesgate Hotel in Boston on February 23, 1917.

== Selected designs ==
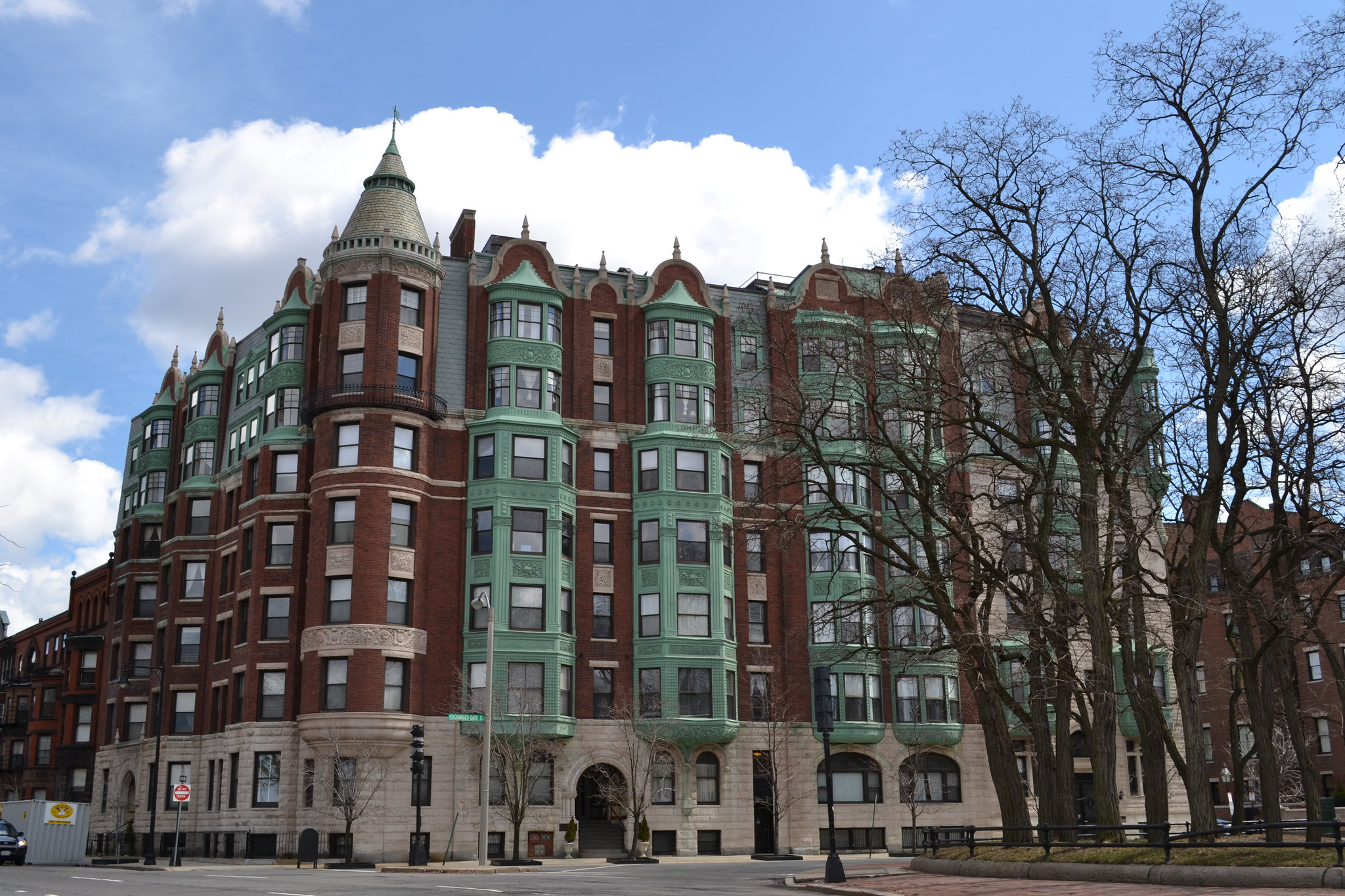
Former Charlesgate Hotel

- 1872 – George S. Draper house, Hopedale, Massachusetts (demolished)
- 1872 – Cottage, Nahant, Massachusetts (Remodel, with George T. Tilden)
- 1875 – House, 63 Marlborough Street, Boston, Massachusetts
- 1876 – Hotel Cluny, 545-547 Boylston Street, Boston, Massachusetts (demolished).
- 1877 – Manhattan Beach Hotel, Coney Island, New York
- 1878 – House, 277 Dartmouth Street, Boston, Massachusetts
- 1878 – House, 167 Marlborough Street, Boston, Massachusetts
- 1881 – House, 195 Commonwealth Avenue, Boston, Massachusetts
- 1884 – House, 399 Marlborough Street, Boston, Massachusetts
- 1890 – Charlesgate Hotel, 535 Beacon Street, Boston, Massachusetts
- 1891 – Langmaid Terrace, 359-365 Broadway, Somerville, Massachusetts
- 1894 – Haddon Hall, 29 Commonwealth Avenue, Boston, Massachusetts
- 1896 – Commonwealth Hotel, Boston, Massachusetts

== Image gallery ==
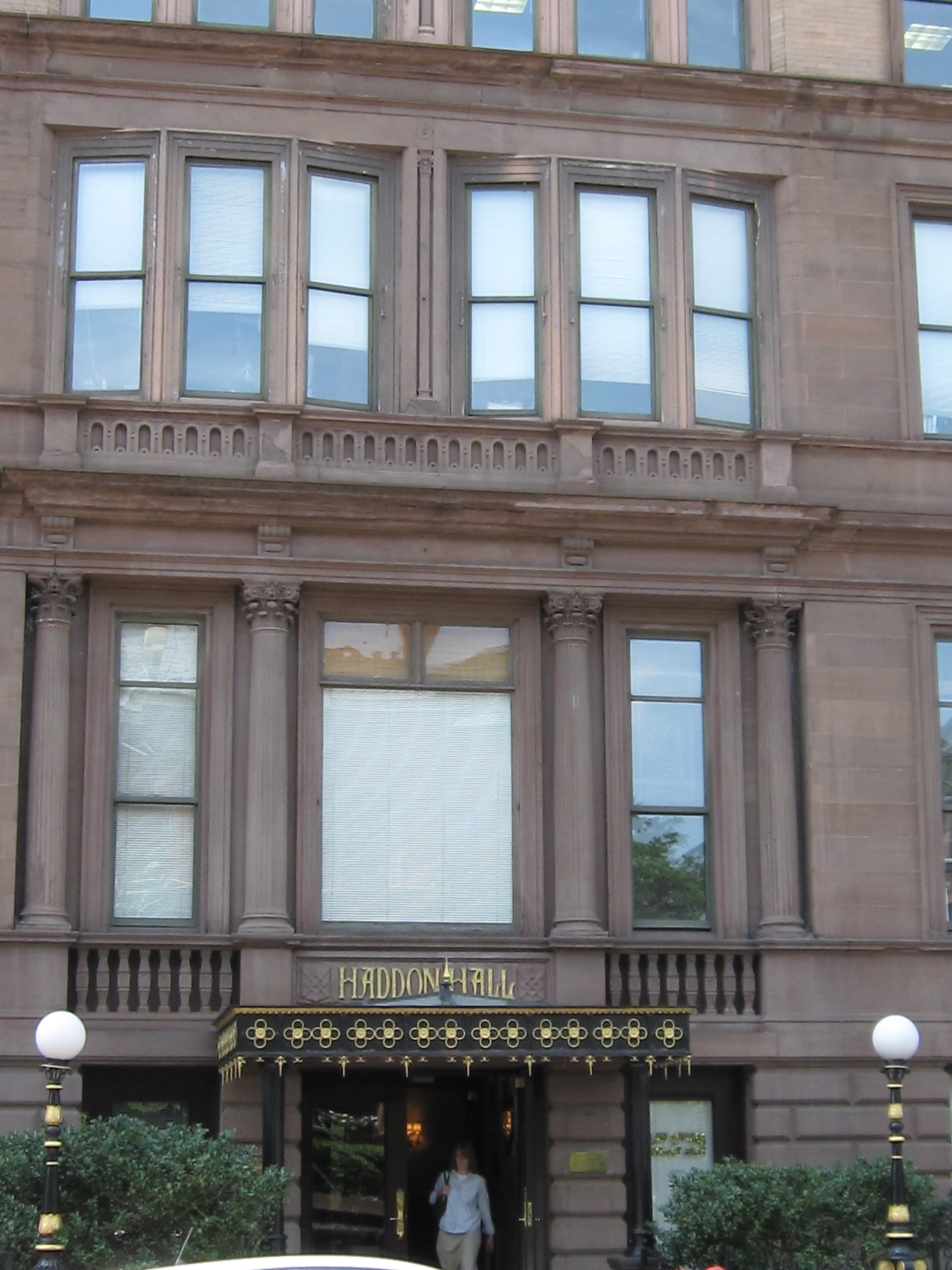
Haddon Hall, Boston

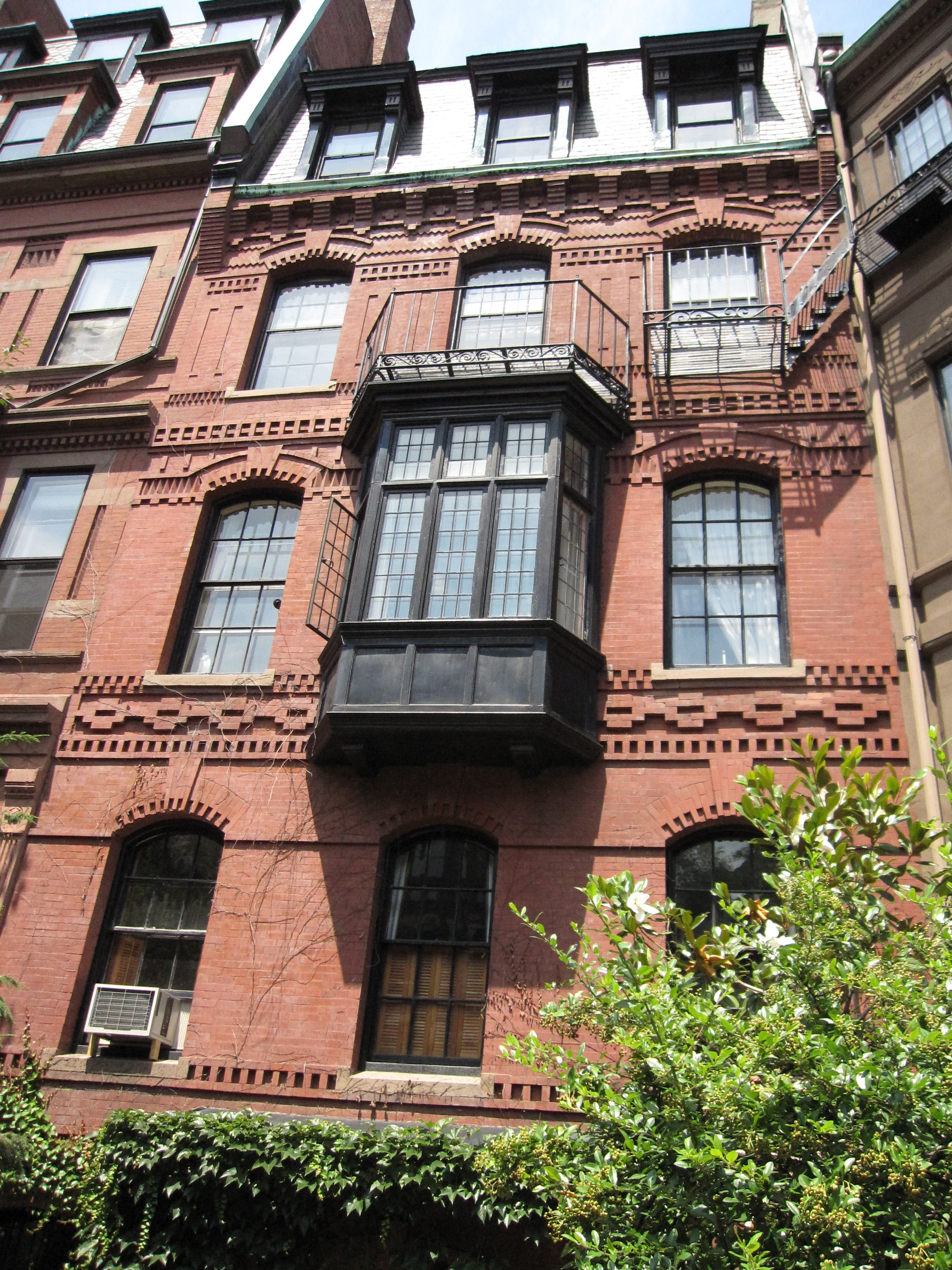
63 Marlborough St., Boston

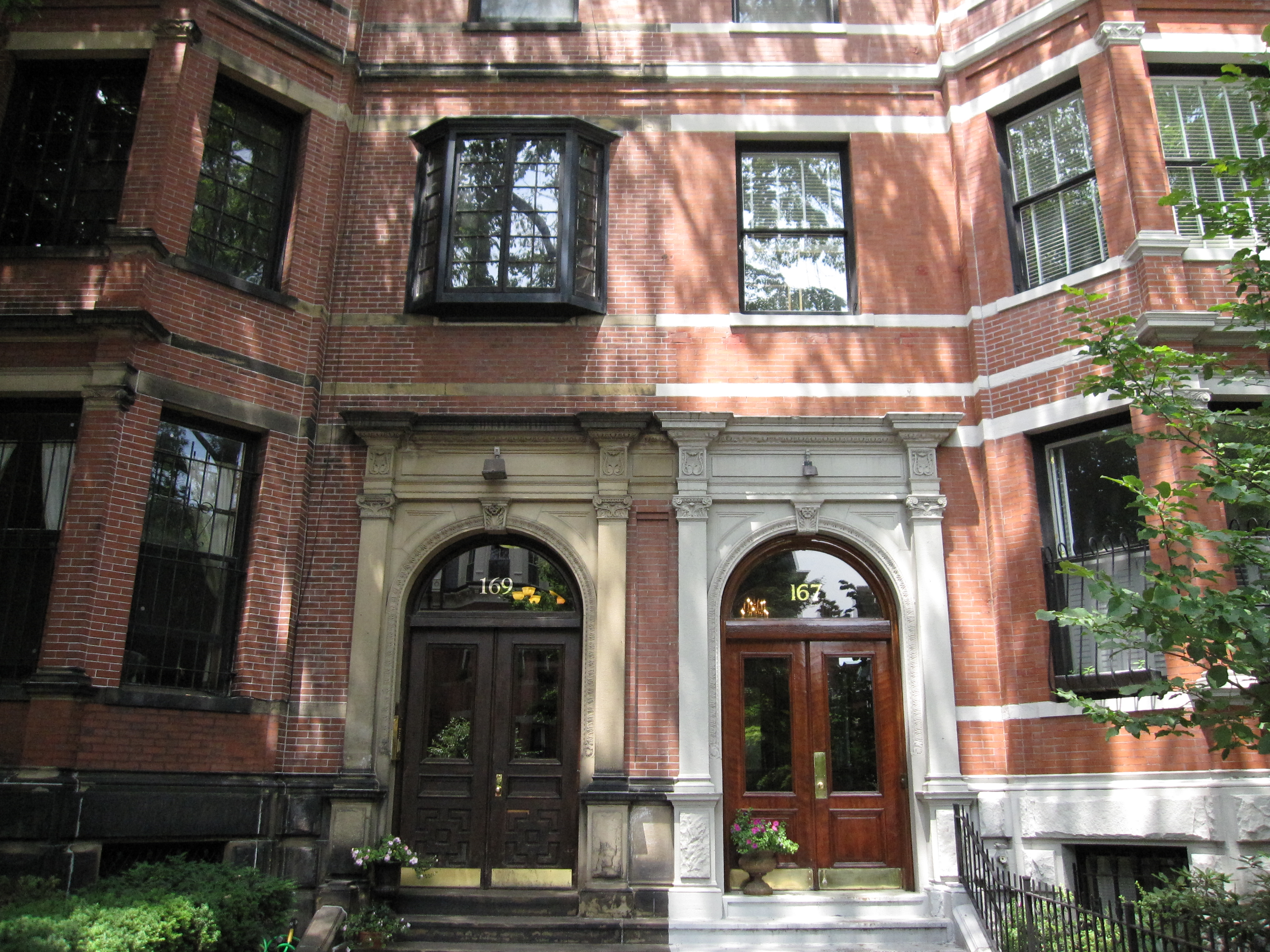
167 Marlborough St., Boston

== Works ==
- The metric system of weights and measures. 1877.
- The open fire-place in all ages. 1880.
- Improved Plumbing Appliances. 1887
- Architecture under nationalism. 1890.
- The outlook for the artisan and his art. 1899. "The author shows how the change, from the profit system to Nationalism, will relieve the artisan from anxiety and enable him to put art into his daily work to an extent that the world has never yet seen."
- Plumbing and household sanitation. 1911.
