= Union Square Main Streets =

Community development organization in Somerville, Massachusetts

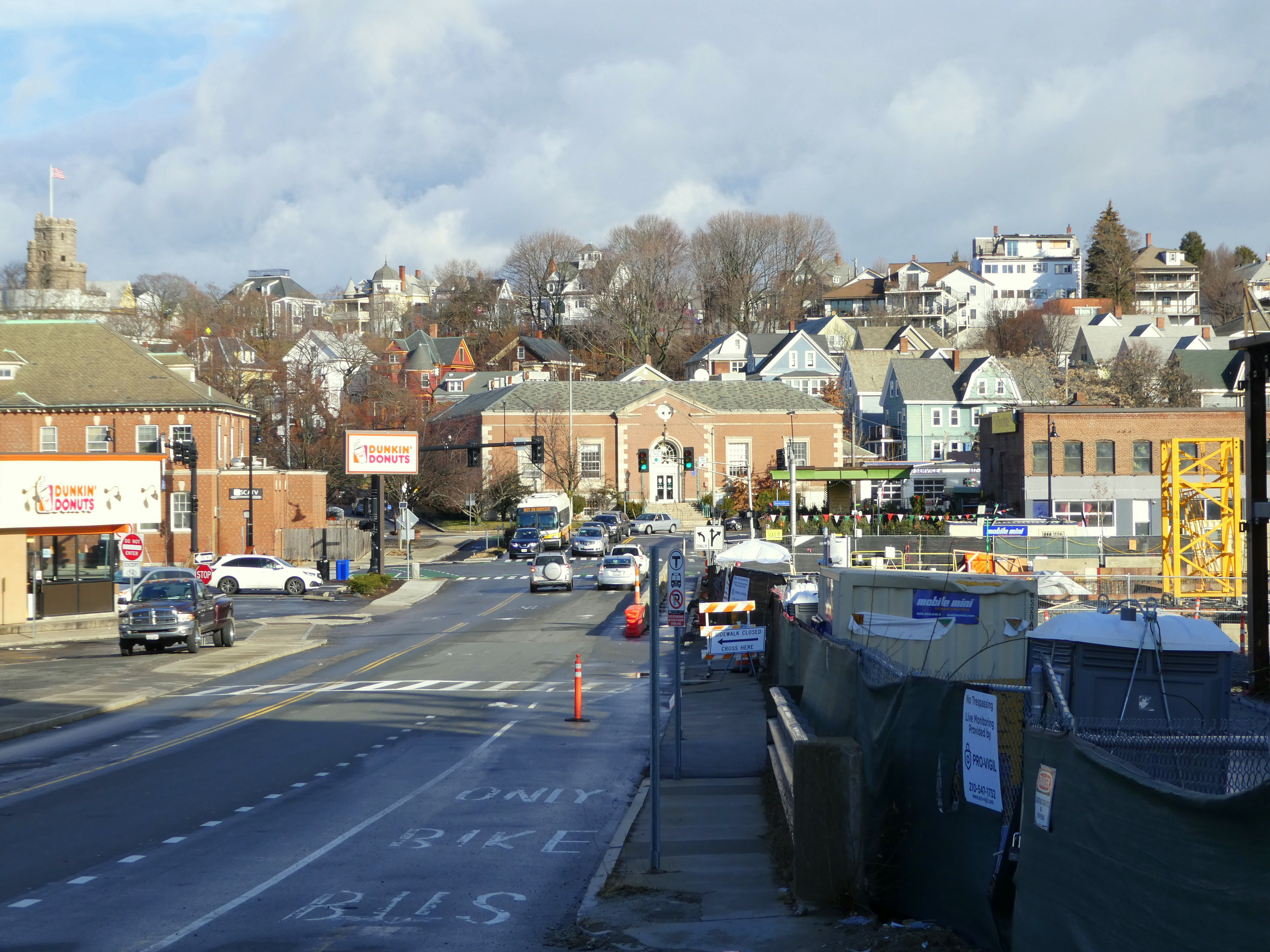
- Prospect Street leading towards Union Square (2021)
- Formation: 2005; 21 years ago
- Founder: Joseph Curtatone
- Type: Nonprofit
- Purpose: Community development
- Location: Somerville, Massachusetts, USA

Union Square Main Streets is a community development organization in Somerville, Massachusetts that aims to enhance the Union Square area's commercial viability through collaborative efforts in design, promotion, economic restructuring, transportation, and organization.

== History ==
Initiated by Mayor Joseph Curtatone in 2005, Union Square Main Streets is a non-profit, public-private partnership between the City of Somerville, the National Main Street Center, Union Square business leaders, residents and community leaders. The city's first community-based economic revitalization program provides merchants and community residents with the tools for the neighborhood to advance its own redevelopment.

It is the local implementation of the Main Street model developed by the National Trust for Historic Preservation for downtown district revitalization. Begun in 1977 by the National Trust for Historic Preservation initially to protect historic commercial architecture, the Main Street model is a comprehensive revitalization strategy to stimulate economic development in traditional commercial districts like Union Square. Currently the National Main Street Center administers the program in 40 states and over 1600 communities in the US, most notably with a citywide network of Main Street districts in Boston. The Main Street model is a framework for restoring a community's economic vitality then maintaining these positive changes.

Among the organization's efforts are the Union Square Farmers Market (every Saturday morning from June through October), ArtsUnion (a collaborative program with the Somerville Arts Council that sponsors festivals, craft markets, street furniture and more), and business recruitment and assistance.

When planning for an extension of the Green Line between the East Cambridge neighborhood and Tufts University, Union Square Main Streets contributed to the successful push by local politicians to attract state and federal funding to add a spur into the Union Square neighborhood, with work design and construction work progressing as of February 2019.
