= Will Mbah =

American politician

- Mbah in 2025

Member-elect of the Massachusetts House of Representatives from the 34th Middlesex district
- Assuming office January 2027
- Succeeding: Christine Barber

Member of the Somerville City Council At-Large
- Incumbent
- Assumed office January 2024
- In office January 2018 – January 2022

Personal details
- Party: Democratic
- Education: University of Buea (BA); Swedish University of Agricultural Sciences (MA); Harvard Kennedy School (MPA)

Will Mbah (born 1980/1981) is an American politician. An immigrant from Cameroon, he obtained a master degree in Sweden and became environmental analyst at the Massachusetts Department of Environmental Protection. An at-large member of Somerville City Council, he became the Democratic member-elect of the Massachusetts House of Representatives from the 34th Middlesex district.

== Biography ==
Mbah was born in 1980 or 1981 in Cameroon. He studied at the University of Buea, where he obtained a bachelor of science degree in environmental science in 2005, and the Swedish University of Agricultural Sciences, where he obtained a master of science degree in soil science. He moved to the United States in 2010, settling in Taunton.

Shortly after immigration, Mbah worked as a dishwasher and janitor, and moved five times in six years due to a lack of housing affordability. In 2020, he joined the Massachusetts Department of Environmental Protection as an environmental analyst. In 2024, he obtained a master's degree in public administration from Harvard Kennedy School.

In 2018, Mbah became an at-large member of Somerville City Council; he cited affordability as his reason for running for the position. He ran in the 2021 election for mayor; he cited the effects of climate change, a senior citizen safety net, universal childcare and preschool as campaign priorities. He advanced to the general election but lost to Katjana Ballantyne.

Mbah has criticized the real estate developers' influence on the city, refusing their campaign contributions.

Mbah ran in the Massachusetts House of Representatives' 34th Middlesex district in the 2026 election. He won the Democratic primary in September 2026, defeating two other candidates. As there were no other candidates on the general election ballot, he won the seat automatically in November.
