= Katjana Ballantyne =

Mayor of Somerville, Massachusetts from 2022 to 2026

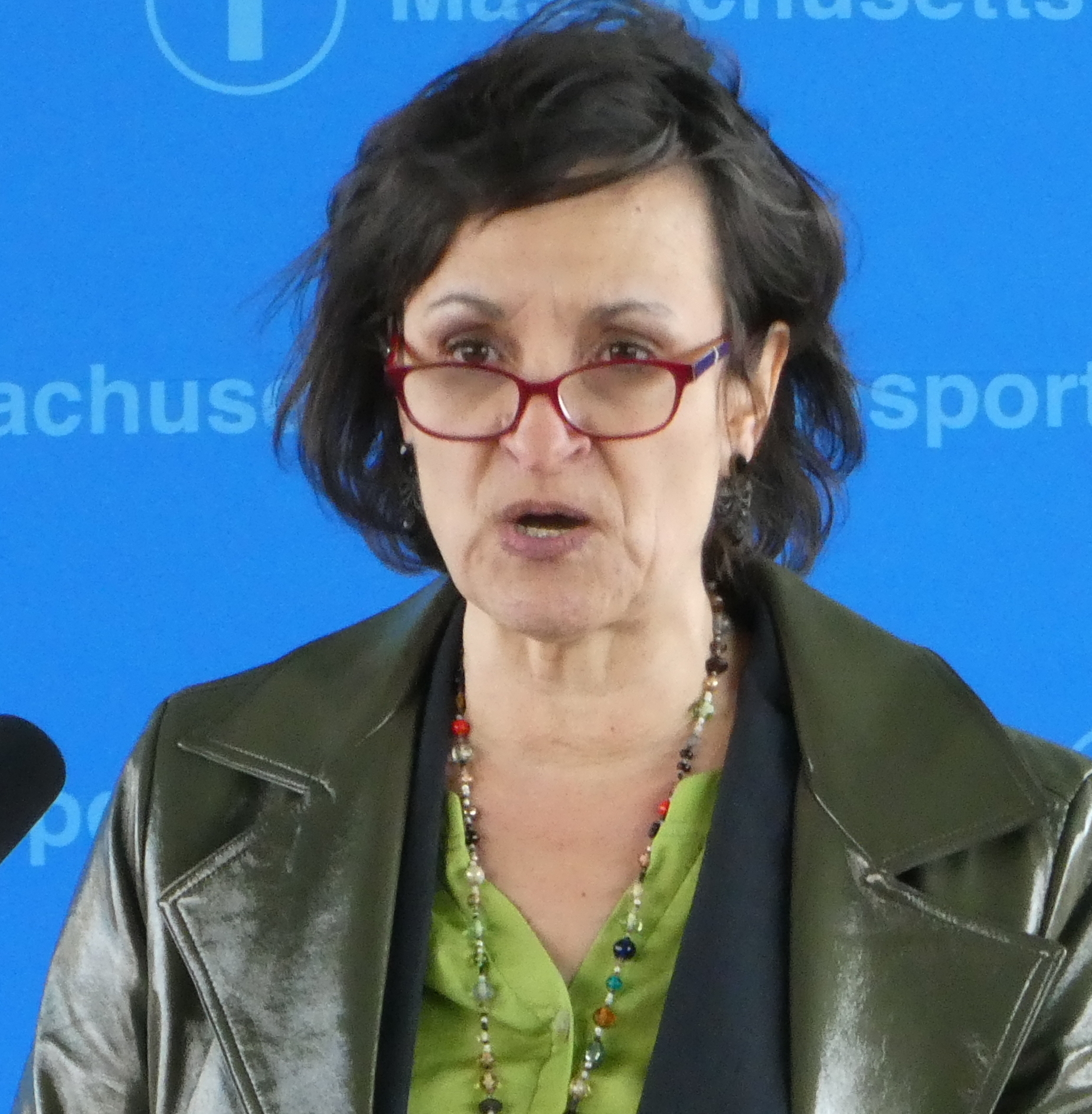
- Ballantyne at the opening of Union Square Station in 2022

36th Mayor of Somerville
- In office January 3, 2022 – January 2, 2026
- Preceded by: Joseph Curtatone
- Succeeded by: Jake Wilson

Personal details
- Born: 1962 (age 63–64)
- Party: Democratic
- Education: Saint Michael's College (B.A.); Suffolk University (M.B.A.)

Katjana Ballantyne (born 1962) is an American politician who served as the 36th mayor of Somerville, Massachusetts between January 3, 2022 and January 2, 2026.

== Early life and education ==
Ballantyne was born in Greece and was adopted by her father and mother, a Scottish man and a Czech-German woman. They immigrated to the United States four years after she was born. She later received her B.A. from Saint Michael's College in 1984 and her M.B.A. from Suffolk University in 1998.

== Political Career ==
Ballantyne ran unsuccessfully in a close race for the Ward 7 seat on the Somerville City Council (then named the Board of Aldermen) in 2011, but ran again successfully in 2013, and won each of her reelection bids. She was elected President of the City Council by her fellow councilors in 2018.

After then-mayor Joe Curtatone announced that he would not run for another term, Ballantyne announced her bid for mayor in 2021, and won in a race against fellow city councilor Will Mbah. She ran and won a second term in 2023.

In February 2025, under Ballantyne's administration, Somerville, alongside Chelsea, Massachusetts, sued the Trump administration for threatening to withdraw federal funds from the city because of its sanctuary city status.

She ran for a third term in 2025, but lost in a preliminary election against city councilors Willie Burnley Jr. and Jake Wilson. Wilson went on to win in the municipal election and took office on January 2, 2026, ending Ballantyne's term.

== Electoral history ==
=== City Council ===
2011 Somerville City Council election (Ward 7)
Candidate	Preliminary election		Municipal election	
Candidate	Votes	%	Votes	%
Robert C. Trane (inc.)	541	42.8	1,068	50.8
Katjana Ballantyne	532	42.1	1,028	48.9
Joan Whitney Puglia	187	14.8		
Write-in	4	0.3	5	0.2
Total	1,264	100	2,101	100

2013 Somerville City Council election (Ward 7)
Candidate	Municipal election	
Candidate	Votes	%
Katjana Ballantyne	1,122	57.5
Joseph A. Capuano	825	42.3
Write-in	4	0.2
Total	1,951	100

2015 Somerville City Council election (Ward 7)
Candidate	Municipal election	
Candidate	Votes	%
Katjana Ballantyne (inc.)	687	98
Write-in	14	2
Total	701	100

2017 Somerville City Council election (Ward 7)
Candidate	Municipal election	
Candidate	Votes	%
Katjana Ballantyne (inc.)	1,724	98.7
Write-in	23	1.3
Total	1,747	100

2019 Somerville City Council election (Ward 7)
Candidate	Municipal election	
Candidate	Votes	%
Katjana Ballantyne (inc.)	1,566	97.7
Write-in	37	2.3
Total	1,603	100

=== Mayor ===
2021 Somerville mayoral election
Candidate	Preliminary election		Municipal election	
Candidate	Votes	%	Votes	%
Katjana Ballantyne	4,176	27.8	10,032	55.5
Will Mbah	4,509	30.0	6,737	37.2
Mary Cassesso	4,088	27.2		
William B. Tauro	2,219	14.8		
Write-in	19	0.1	1,321	7.3
Total	15,011	100	18,090	100

2023 Somerville mayoral election
Candidate	Municipal election	
Candidate	Votes	%
Katjana Ballantyne (inc.)	13,657	80.9
William B. Tauro	3,029	17.9
Write-in	201	1.2
Total	20,497	100

2025 Somerville mayoral election
Candidate	Preliminary election		Municipal election	
Candidate	Votes	%	Votes	%
Jake Wilson	5,190	42.1	11,294	55.1
Willie Burnley, Jr	4,174	33.9	9,144	44.6
Katjana Ballantyne (inc.)	2,927	23.7		
Write-in	40	0.3	59	0.3
Total	12,331	100	20,497	100
