= Joseph Curtatone =

35th mayor of Somerville, Massachusetts

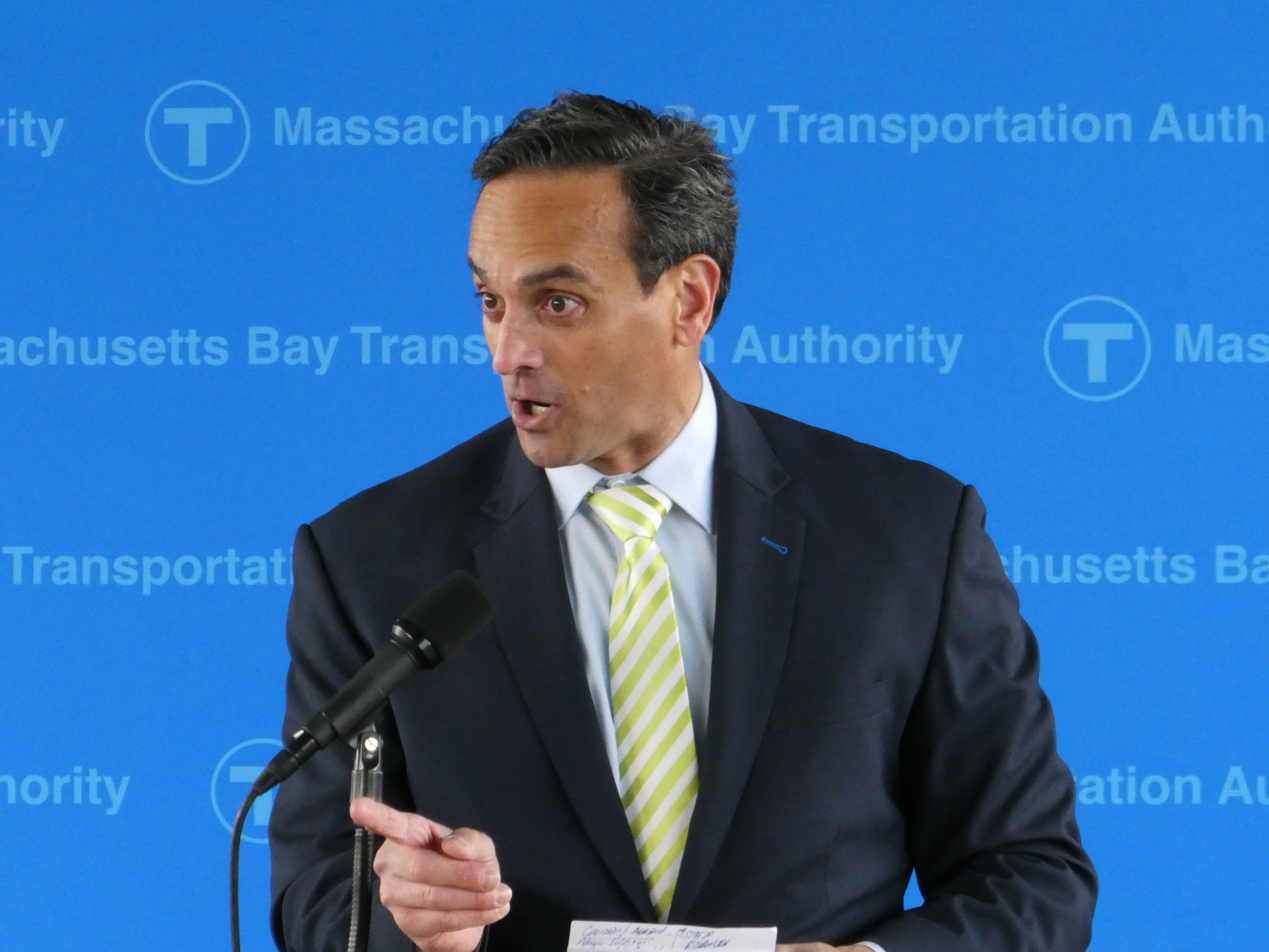
- Curtatone in March 2022

35th Mayor of Somerville
- In office January 5, 2004 – January 3, 2022
- Preceded by: Dorothy Kelly Gay
- Succeeded by: Katjana Ballantyne

Personal details
- Born: Joseph Anthony Curtatone; June 28, 1966 (age 59) Somerville, Massachusetts, U.S.
- Party: Democratic
- Spouse: Nancy Curtatone
- Education: Boston College (B.A.); New England School of Law (J.D.); Harvard University (MC/MPA)

Joseph "Joe" Anthony Curtatone (born June 28, 1966) is an American politician from Somerville, Massachusetts who formerly served as the city's 35th mayor from 2004 until 2022.

== Early life and education ==
Curtatone was born and raised in Somerville, Massachusetts and graduated from Somerville High School in 1984. He later earned his B.A. from Boston College in 1990, his J.D. from the New England School of Law in 1994, and his MC/MPA from Harvard Kennedy School in 2011.

== Career ==
After serving as an Alderman for the city of Somerville for eight years, Curtatone was elected mayor in 2003. At 38, he was the second youngest mayor in Somerville history. He concluded his ninth and final, term as mayor in 2022 after 18 years in office, the longest tenure of any Somerville mayor. In 2006, Somerville was recognized by The Boston Globe Magazine as the Best Run City in the Commonwealth. On March 1, 2021, he announced that he would not seek another term as mayor of Somerville.

=== Sanctuary city ===
In January 2017, Curtatone reaffirmed Somerville's sanctuary city policy saying "will not waver" in the support for documented and undocumented immigrants. The city will not cooperate with President Donald Trump's executive order reducing grant funding to sanctuary cities and changing deportation standards.

=== Alliance for Climate Transition ===
In January 2022, Curtatone was named President of the Northeast Clean Energy Council (NECEC), a 501(c)3 nonprofit and hybrid trade organization focused on building a "cluster of clean energy companies and climatetech startups through programs centered on innovation and entrepreneurship, industry research and development and workforce development." NECEC was rebranded as ACT (The Alliance for Climate Transition) in 2024 as part of a strategic launch of new initiatives to combat climate disinformation, empower grassroots sustainability policy activists, and support a participatory campaign for their members and public for the climate transition. In 2025, Curtatone was active in local public discussions around energy battery siting, advocating for their net benefits and addressing concerns about battery fires.

=== Jake Wilson Transition Steering Committee ===
After Jake Wilson was elected mayor of Somerville in 2025, Wilson announced that Curtatone would chair his Transition Steering Committee.
