= Broadway Winter Hill Congregational Church =

Historic church in Massachusetts, United States

- U.S. National Register of Historic Places
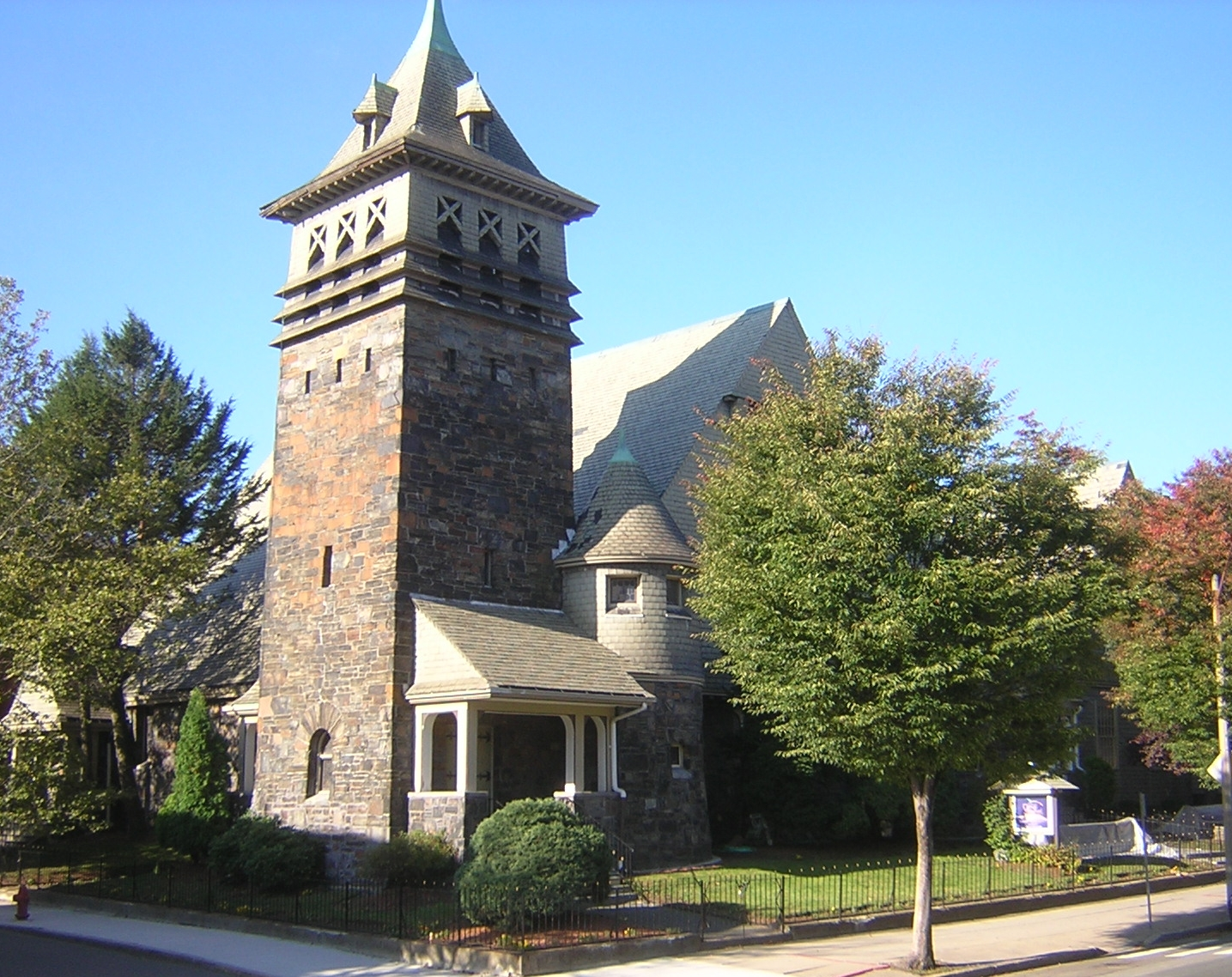

- Location within Massachusetts Location within the United States
- Location: 404 Broadway, Somerville, Massachusetts
- Coordinates: 42°23′43″N 71°5′57″W
- Area: less than one acre
- Built: 1890
- Architect: Hartwell and Richardson
- Architectural style: Shingle Style
- MPS: Somerville MPS
- NRHP reference No.: 89001238
- Added to NRHP: September 18, 1989

The Broadway Winter Hill Congregational Church is a historic church building at 404 Broadway in Somerville, Massachusetts. Built in 1890–91 to a design by Hartwell and Richardson for a Congregationalist congregation founded in 1865, it is one of the city's only examples of Shingle style architecture, and one of its finer architect-designed buildings from the 19th century. The building was listed on the National Register of Historic Places in 1989. It is now home to the Vida Real Church.

== Description and history ==
The Broadway Winter Hill Congregational Church stands near the summit of Winter Hill, at the southwest corner of Broadway and Central Street. It is a wood-frame structure, with a gable roof set perpendicular to Broadway. Its exterior is finished in a combination of stone on the ground floor, and shingles on the upper sections. The main gable has a slightly projecting peak section, above a grouping of three stained glass windows topped by transom-like fixed panes. Projecting forward from the gables left end is a circular two-story turret with a conical roof. Projecting left toward Central Street is a tall square tower, whose front houses the main entrance under a shed-roof portico. The tower is somewhat medieval in appearance, with small windows in its stone lower section. The stone section is topped by a wood-frame louvered belfry, the openings adorned by Stick style woodwork. The tower is capped by a pyramidal roof with flared modillioned eave.

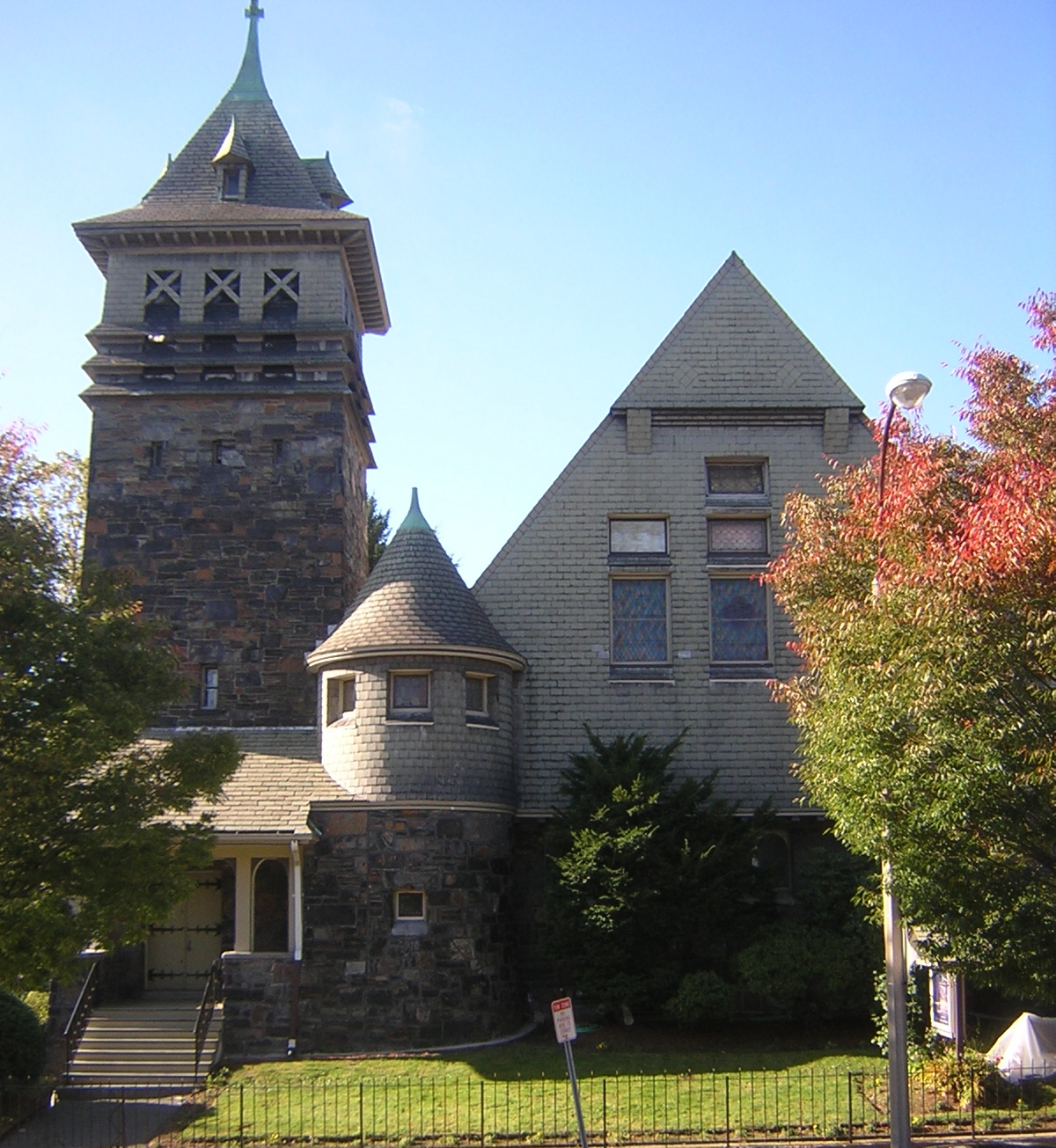

Congregational church activity began in the Winter Hill area as a Sunday School in 1863, and was formally organized as a congregation two year later. The congregation split over doctrinal issues in 1881, with the Winter Hill Congregational Society building this structure in 1890–91, having used an older Carpenter Gothic church before then. It was designed by Hartwell and Richardson, and is one of only a few institutional Shingle style buildings in the city.

== See also ==
- Downer Rowhouses, next to the church on Central Street
- National Register of Historic Places listings in Somerville, Massachusetts
