= Winter Hill, Somerville, Massachusetts =

Neighborhood in Somerville, Massachusetts

Coordinates: 42.391484°N 71.0974646°W

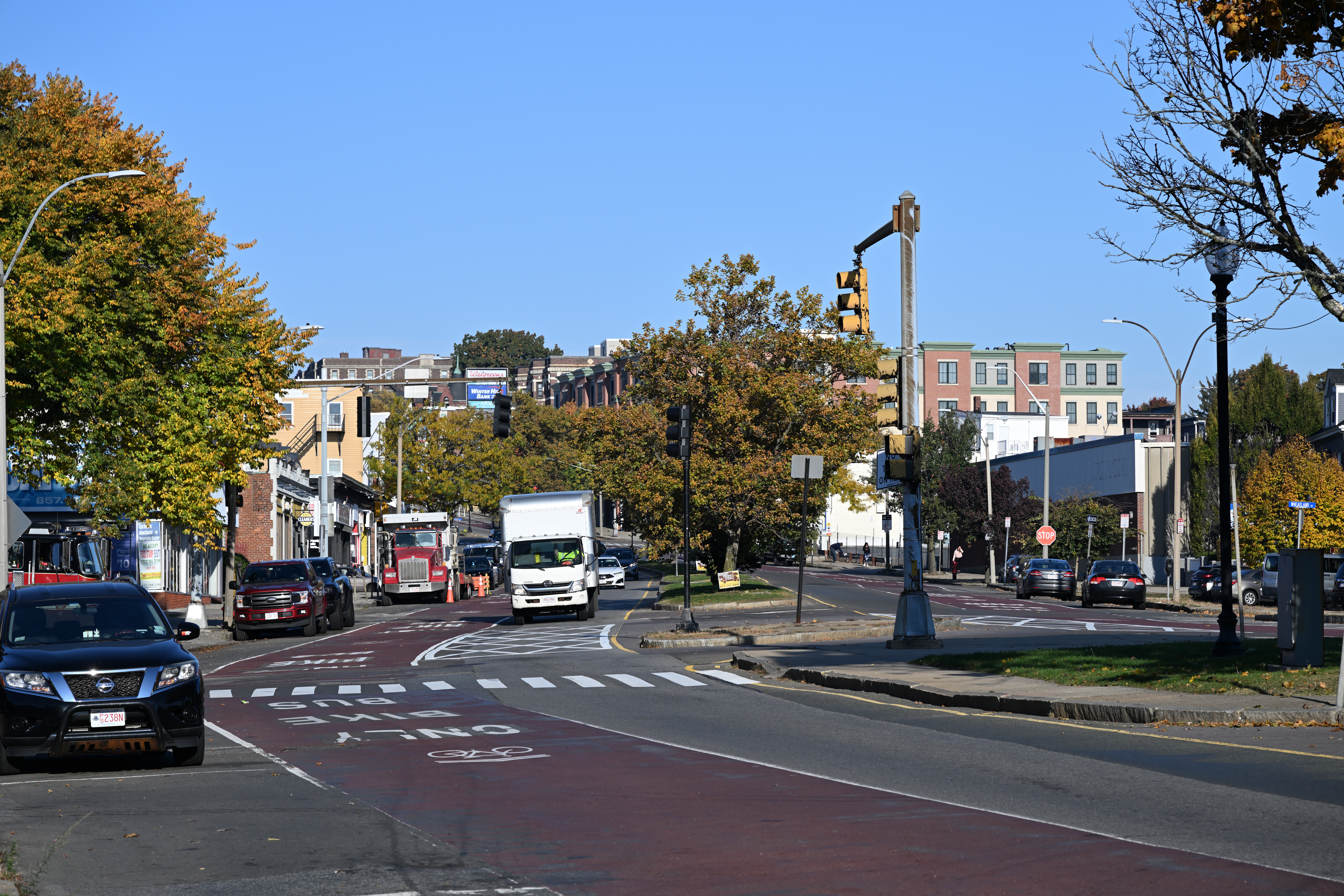
Broadway in Winter Hill

Winter Hill is a neighborhood in Somerville, Massachusetts, United States. It takes its name from the 120-foot hill that occupies its landscape, the name of which dates back to the 18th century. Winter Hill is located roughly north of Medford Street, west of McGrath Highway, and east of Magoun Square.

== History ==
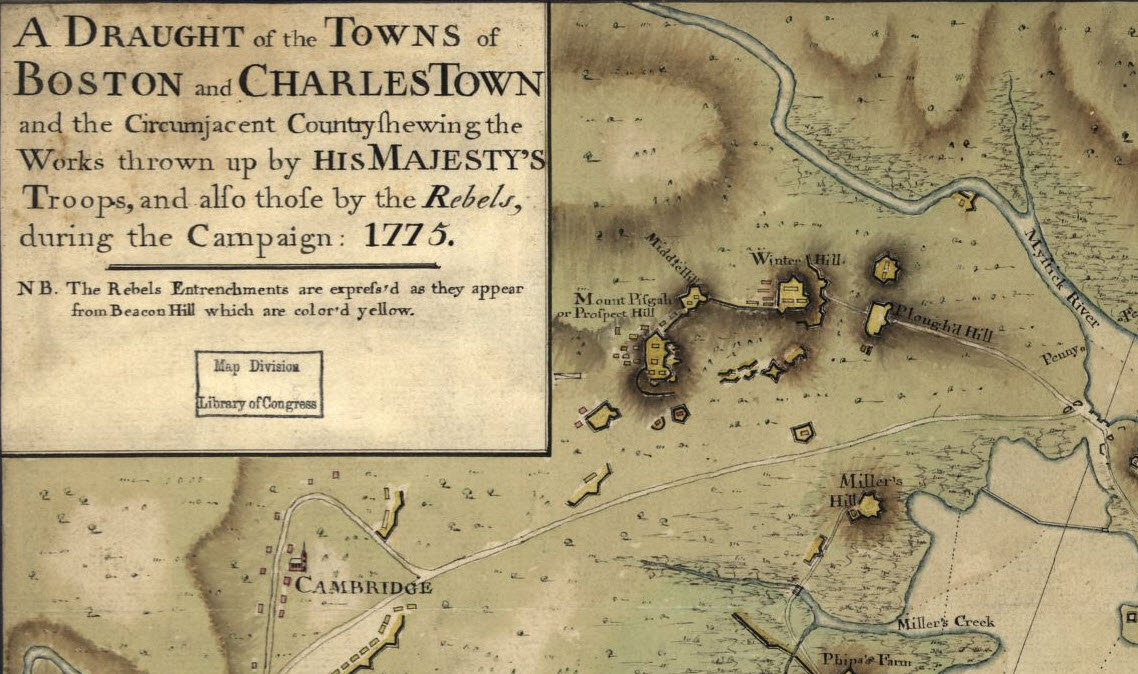
Portion of a map from 1775 highlighting the Winter Hill fortification

An early map of the area (dated 1637) from the papers of the family of John Winthrop includes some of this neighborhood and the adjacent Ten Hills section. A Map of the Battle of Bunker Hill from 1775 displays Winter Hill to the northwest, with woody and marshy regions beyond. A map by Henry Pelham published in 1777 includes the Winter Hill Fort as part of the "Military Works" in the area. The Winter Hill Fort was described as "extensive" among other American Revolutionary War installations, but little evidence of the structural features remains. A "Plan of the Rebels Works" in the Library of Congress collection offers a glimpse of the layout. This stronghold is also diagrammed in a map credited to John Montrésor indicating that this was a part of Charlestown at the time. The "Midnight Ride" of Paul Revere crossed over Winter Hill, and is re-enacted each year as part of the Patriots' Day festivities in the Boston area.

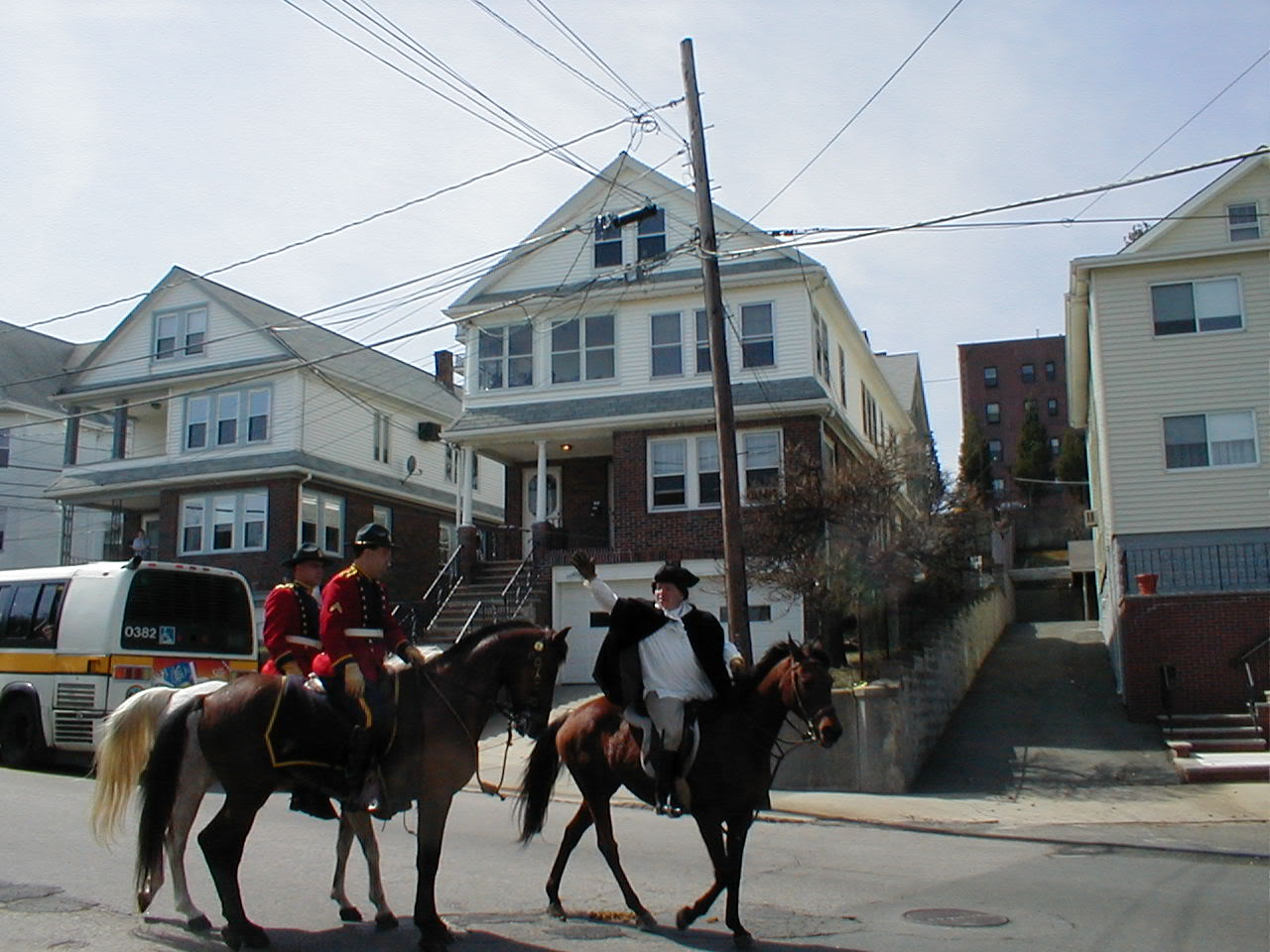
Patriots' Day re-enactment of Paul Revere's Ride in Winter Hill in 2004

Numerous buildings included in the National Register of Historic Places are found in this neighborhood, including the Adams-Magoun House, the Charles Adams-Woodbury Locke House, the Broadway Winter Hill Congregational Church and the Elisha Hopkins House among others. Historical features of the neighborhood include the antique but still usable fire alarm call boxes by the Gamewell company.

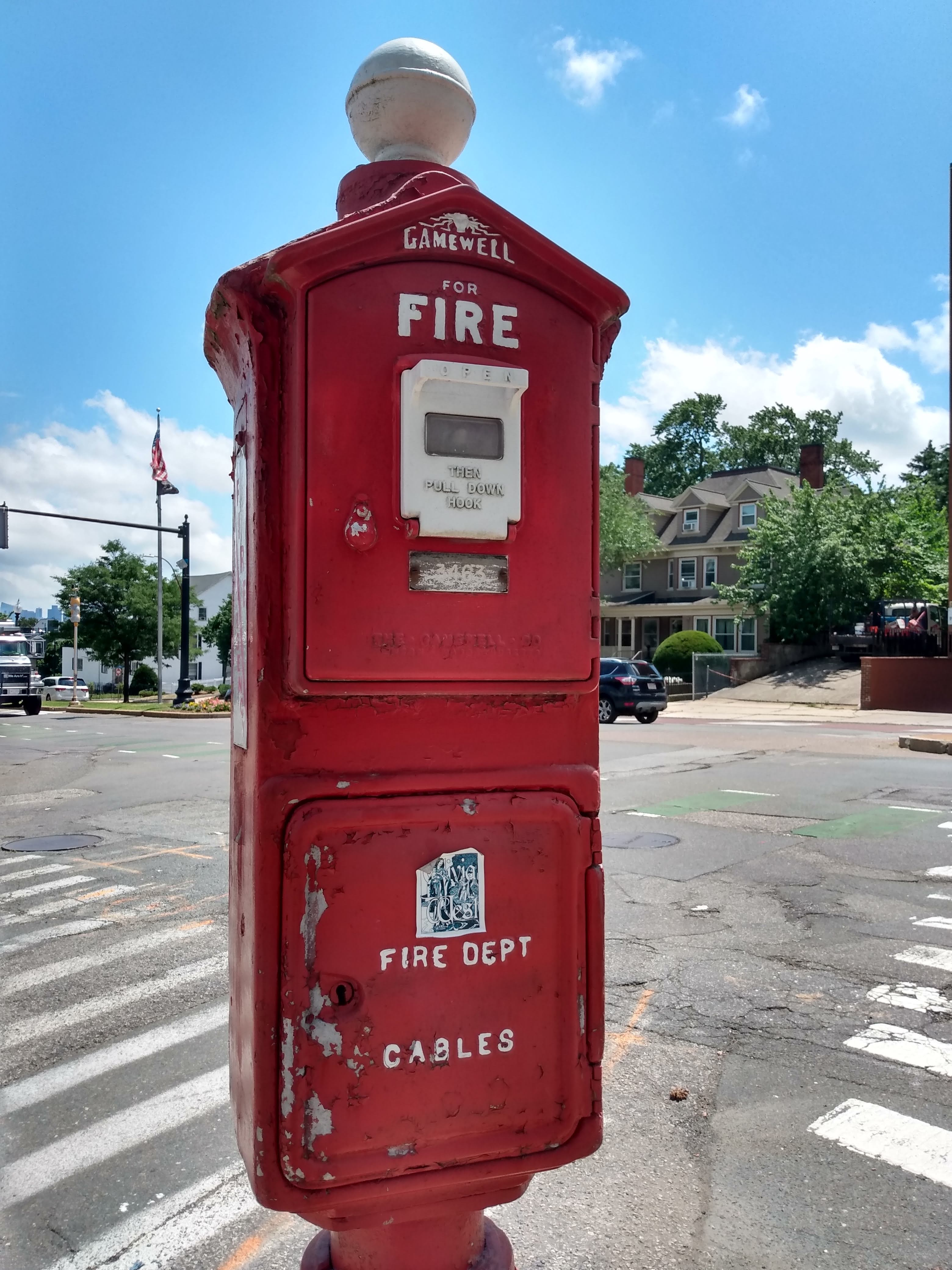
Gamewell Fire Alarm call box

An apartment in the Langmaid Terrace building on Winter Hill at 365 Broadway Avenue was the home of Barack Obama between 1988 and 1991 while he was a student at Harvard Law School.

By the 21st century, Winter Hill featured a mix of restored homes and aging triple deckers, replete with china gnomes and bathtub Virgin Marys. Once known as the home base of Irish gangsters Whitey Bulger, James "Buddy" McLean, Howie Winter and the notorious Winter Hill Gang, Winter Hill is now, as much of the rest of Somerville, experiencing gentrification and a resulting rise in property values and rents. Despite these changes, the area continues to hang onto its neighborhood flavor and is home to a large community of Irish and Italian people.

Winter Hill is home to a variety of eateries, Mama Lisa's and Leone's pizza establishments, Sarma, Tipping Cow, the Winter Hill Bakery, and the Winter Hill Brewing Company. A number of new restaurants, cafes, and shops are in the late planning stages. Neighborhood Produce, a small community-based grocery store, serves the neighborhood from a location on Medford St., next to the Winter Hill Community School. The Theater Coop, one of the Boston area's few new repertory live theaters, is located between Foss Park and the local supermarket. Near Winter Hill in East Somerville is a community pottery studio, called Mudflat, and a collective of stained glass artists called Daniel Maher Stained Glass.

Foss Park abuts Interstate 93 at the base of Winter Hill. The park has a large, colorful mural painted behind the public swimming pool, and is home to a wide variety of sporting matches, especially soccer. At one time a portion of the Middlesex Canal was located on land that became this park.

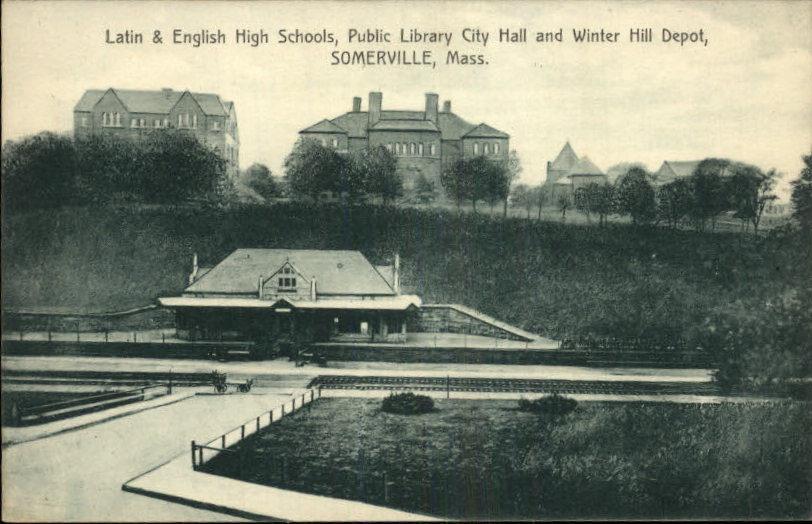
Winter Hill station early postcard

An extension of the Green Line nicknamed the GLX, to the Winter Hill area has been completed, specifically with stations at Medford Street (Gilman Square) and Lowell Street (Magoun Square). Service began operating in December 2022. As of December 2023, the line was still undergoing extensive work due to the tracks being initially installed using the wrong gauge. Workers performed track work in the evenings while trolleys ran revenue service on the line during the day.

== Bibliography ==
- Haskell, Albert L., Haskell's Historical Guide Book of Somerville, Massachusetts
- Frothingham, Richard. History of the Siege of Boston, and of the Battles of Lexington, Concord, and Bunker Hill. Little, Brown, & Company. 1903.
