= Louville V. Niles House =

Historic house in Massachusetts, United States

- U.S. National Register of Historic Places
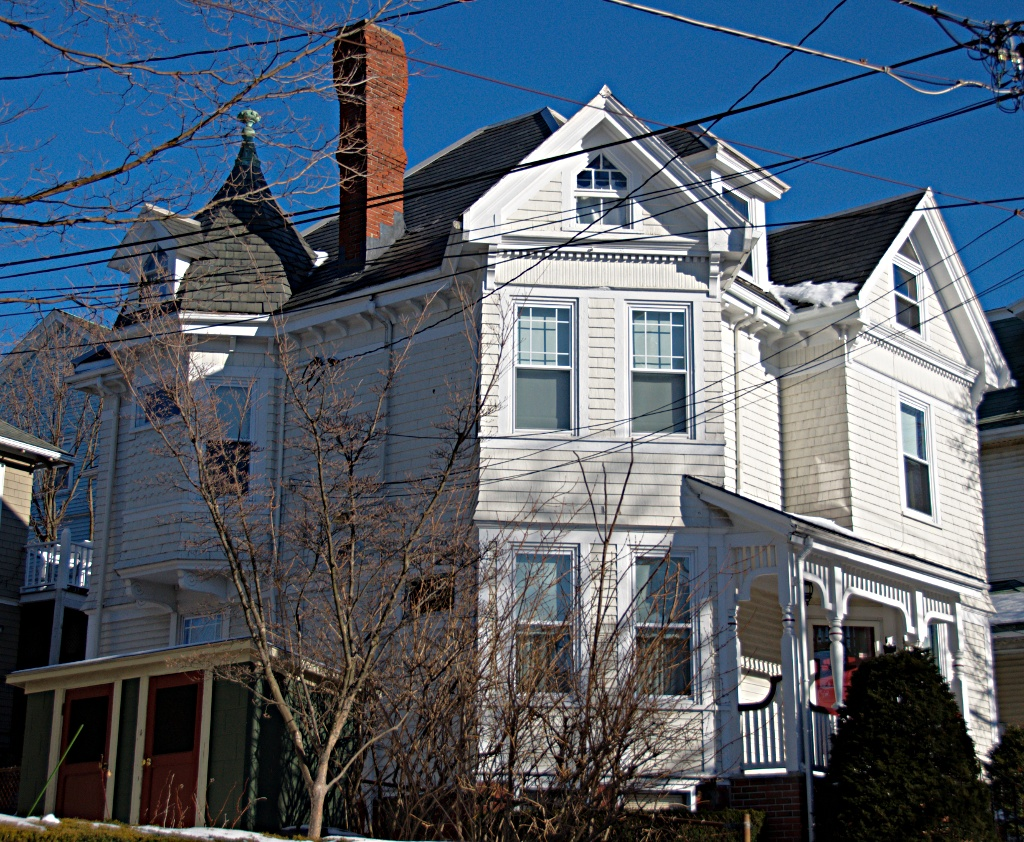

- Location within Massachusetts Location within the United States
- Location: 97 Munroe Street, Somerville, Massachusetts
- Coordinates: 42°22′59.09″N 71°5′42.11″W
- Built: 1890
- Architectural style: Queen Anne
- MPS: Somerville MPS
- NRHP reference No.: 89001276
- Added to NRHP: September 18, 1989

The Louville V. Niles House is a historic house in Somerville, Massachusetts. This 2.5-story wood-frame house was built in 1890 by Louville Niles, a developer and Boston merchant. It is one of the last houses built in the main development phase of the Prospect Hill area. The building has a roughly rectangular massing, with several projecting sections and gables on the roof line, and a decorative chimney top. The front porch has a shed roof on top of spindlework and turned posts.

The house was listed on the National Register of Historic Places in 1989.

== See also ==
- Louville Niles House, Niles' own house on Walnut Street
- National Register of Historic Places listings in Somerville, Massachusetts
