= Louville Niles House =

Historic house in Massachusetts, United States

- U.S. National Register of Historic Places
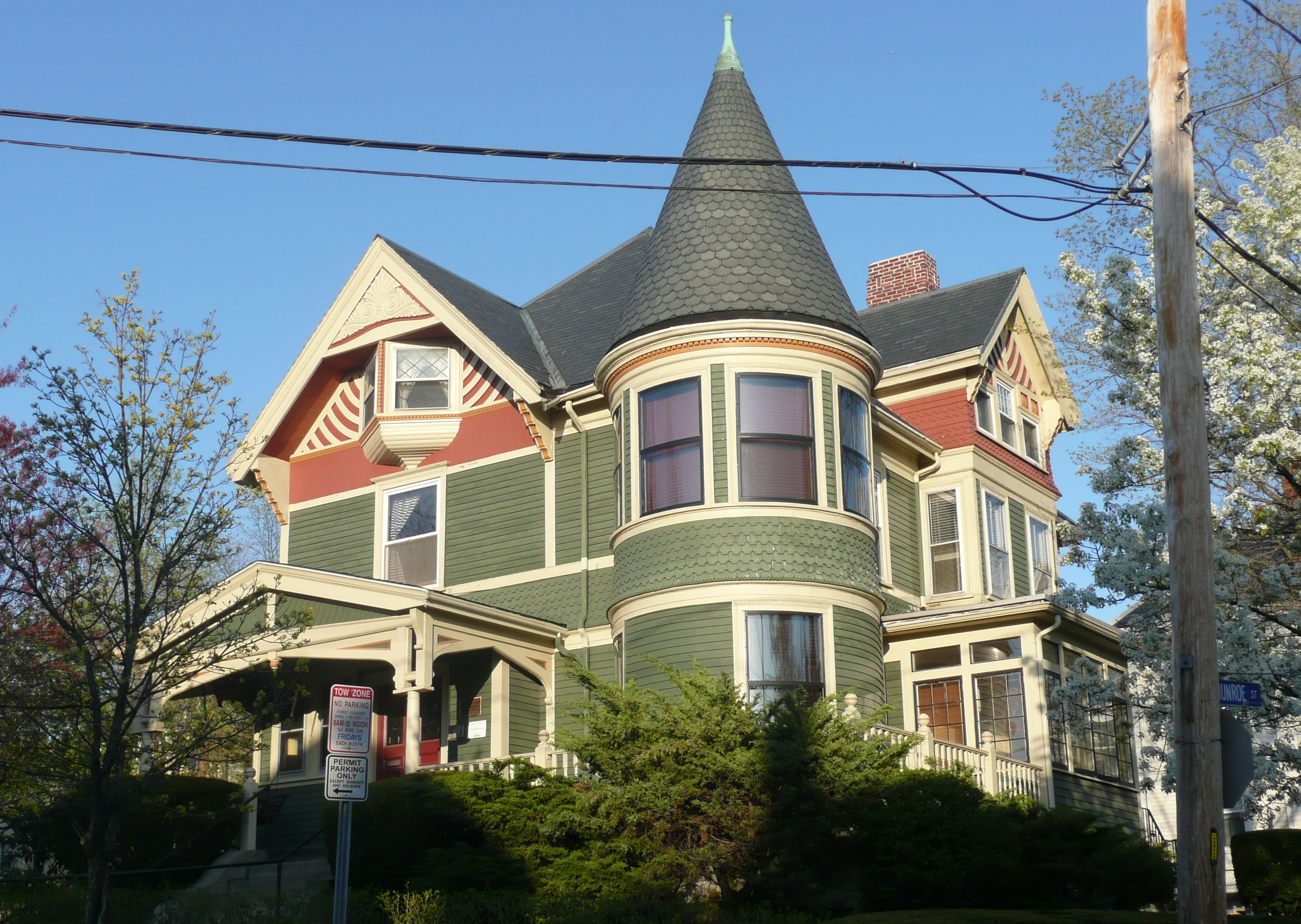

- Location within Massachusetts Location within the United States
- Location: 45 Walnut Street, Somerville, Massachusetts
- Coordinates: 42°22′59.63″N 71°5′42.90″W
- Built: 1890
- Architectural style: Queen Anne
- MPS: Somerville MPS
- NRHP reference No.: 89001295
- Added to NRHP: September 18, 1989

The Louville Niles House is a historic house in Somerville, Massachusetts. The 2 1/2 (2.5) story wood-frame house was built in 1890, and is one of the city's finest Queen Anne Victorian houses. The house was designed by Edwin Blaikie, an MIT graduate and local builder. The building has irregular massing with numerous gable and roof lines. Its most prominent feature is a round projecting corner bay which is topped by a conical roof with copper finial.

The house was listed on the National Register of Historic Places in 1989.

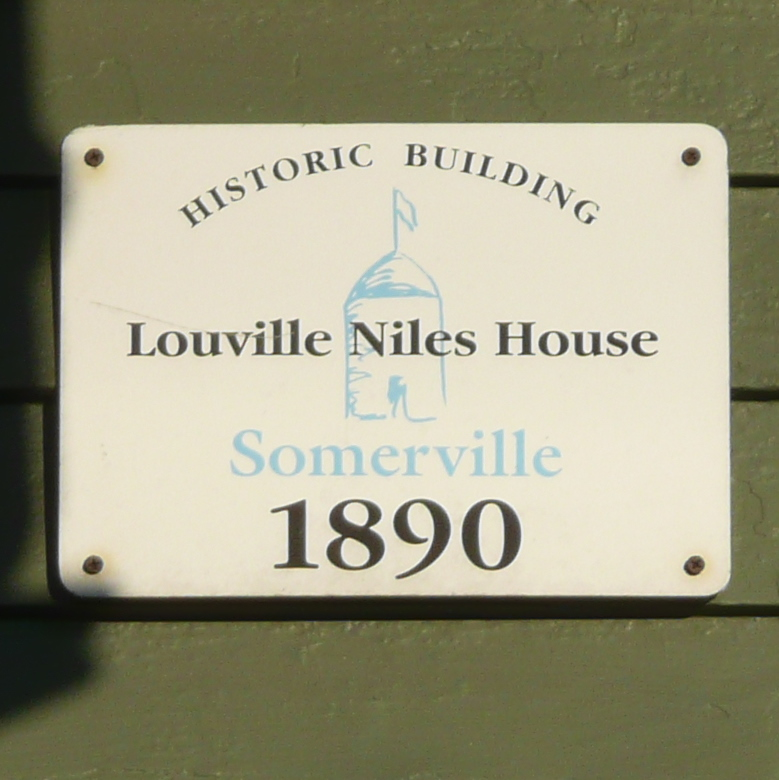
The identifying sign on the face of the Louville Niles House

== See also ==
- National Register of Historic Places listings in Somerville, Massachusetts
- Louville V. Niles House
