= Wakefield, Massachusetts =

- Town
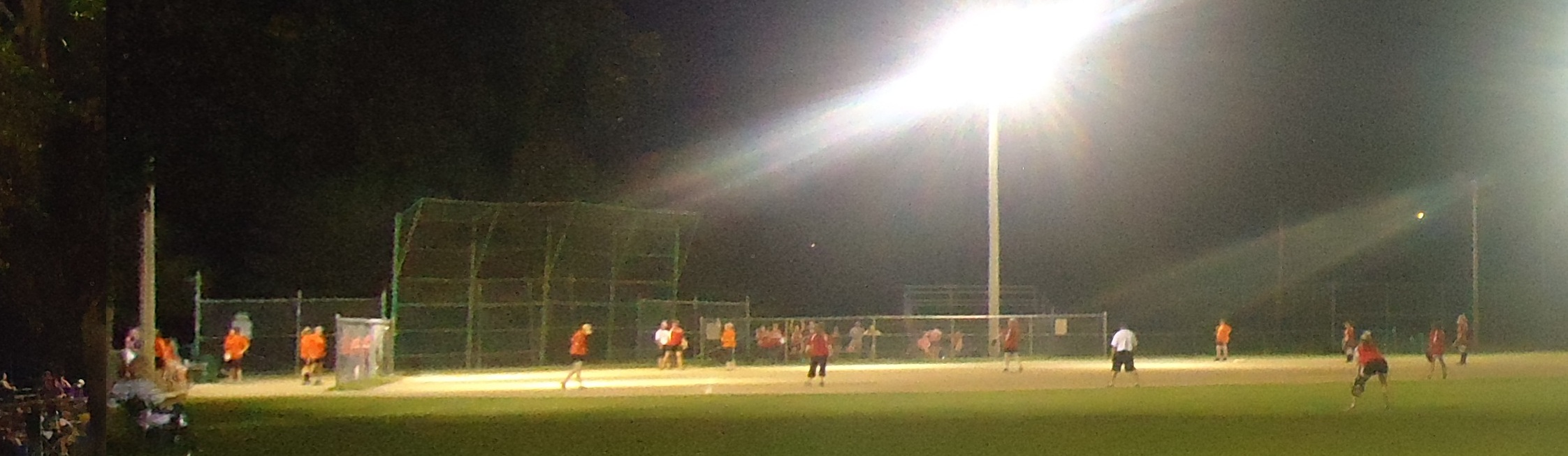
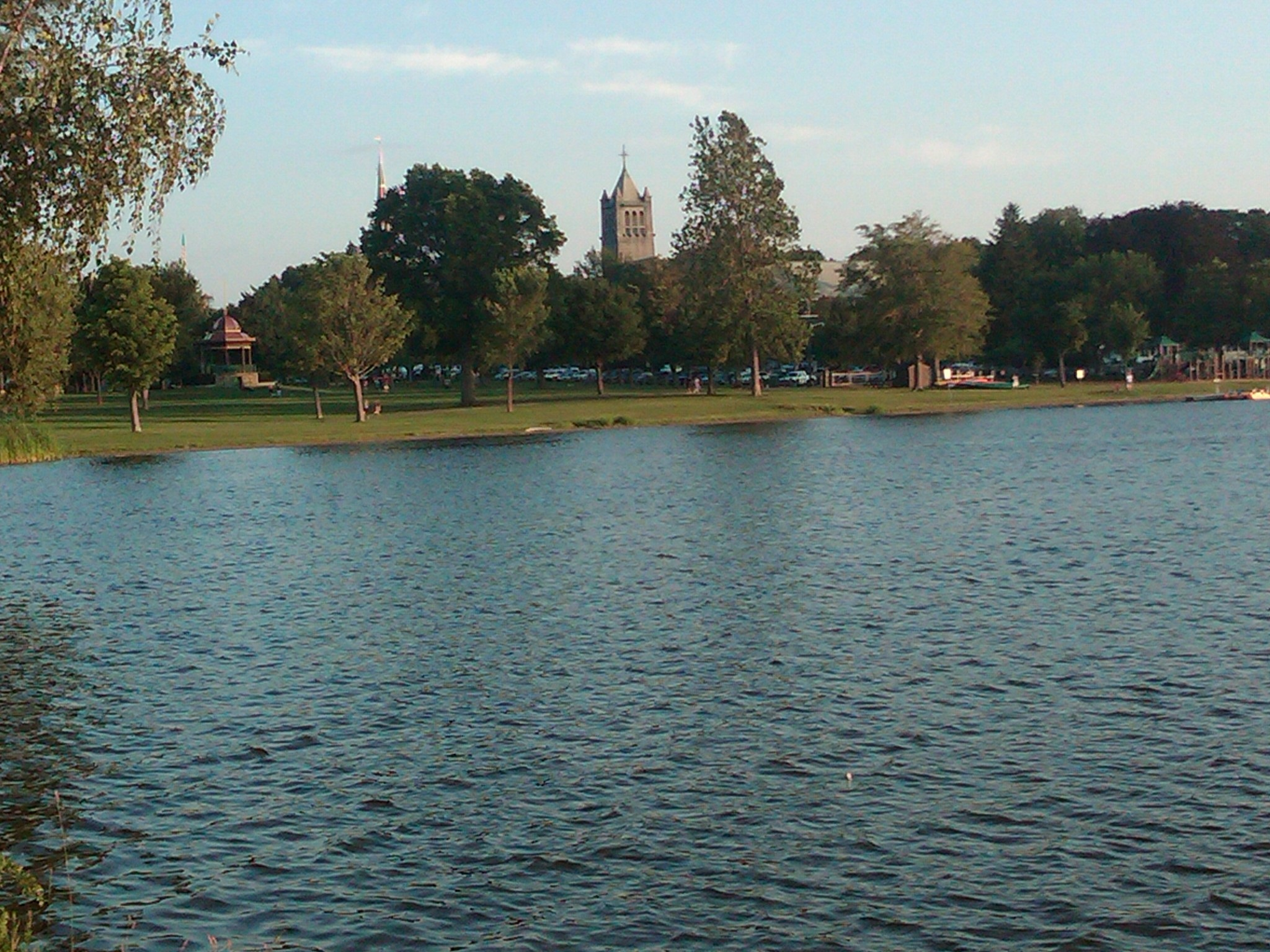
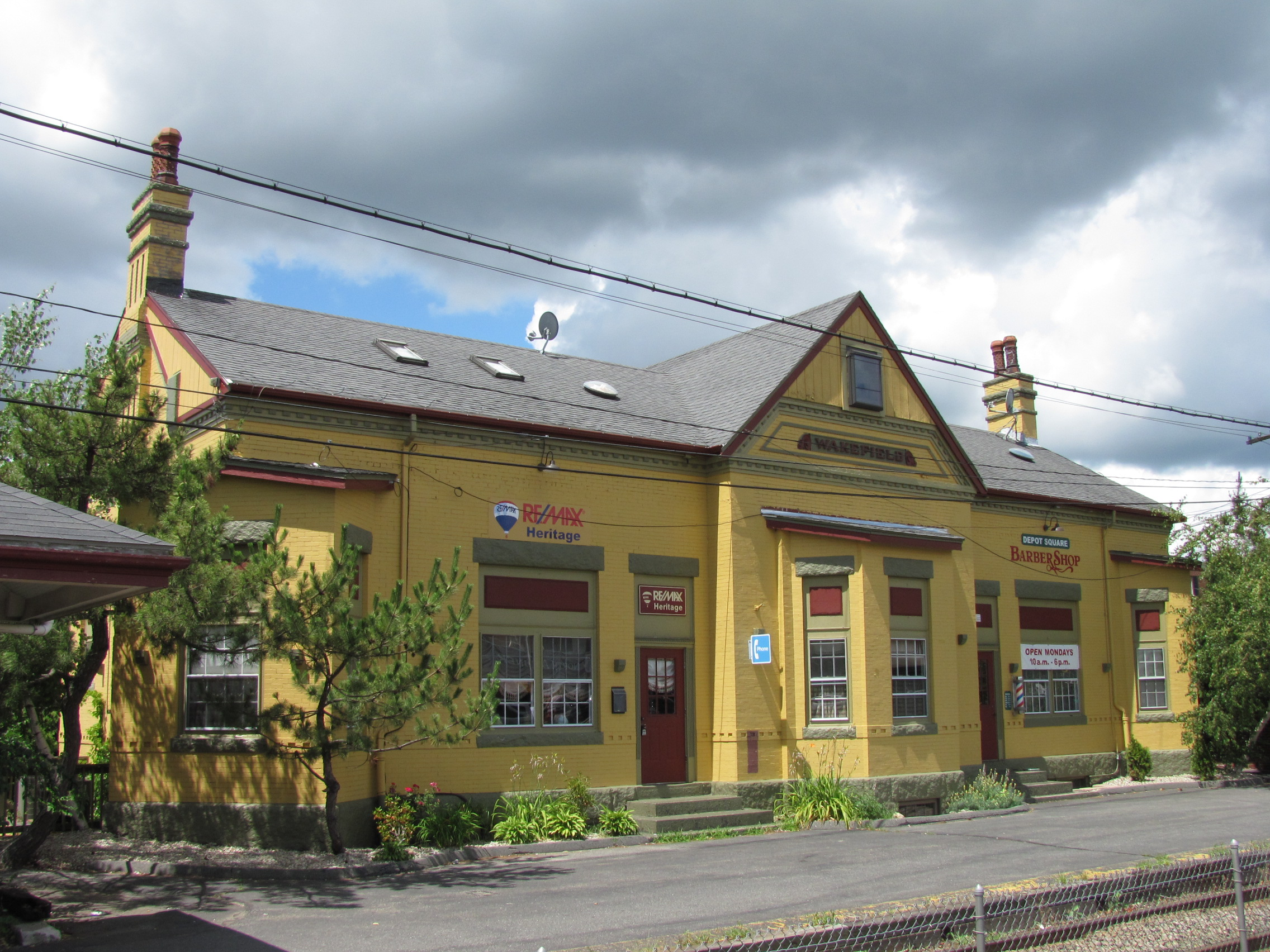
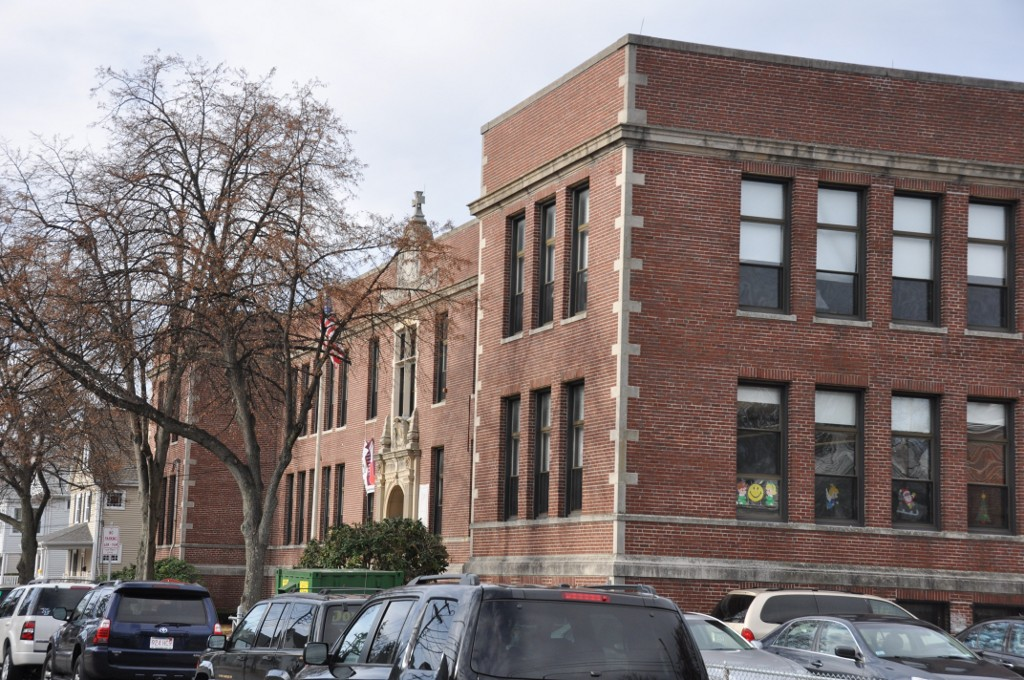
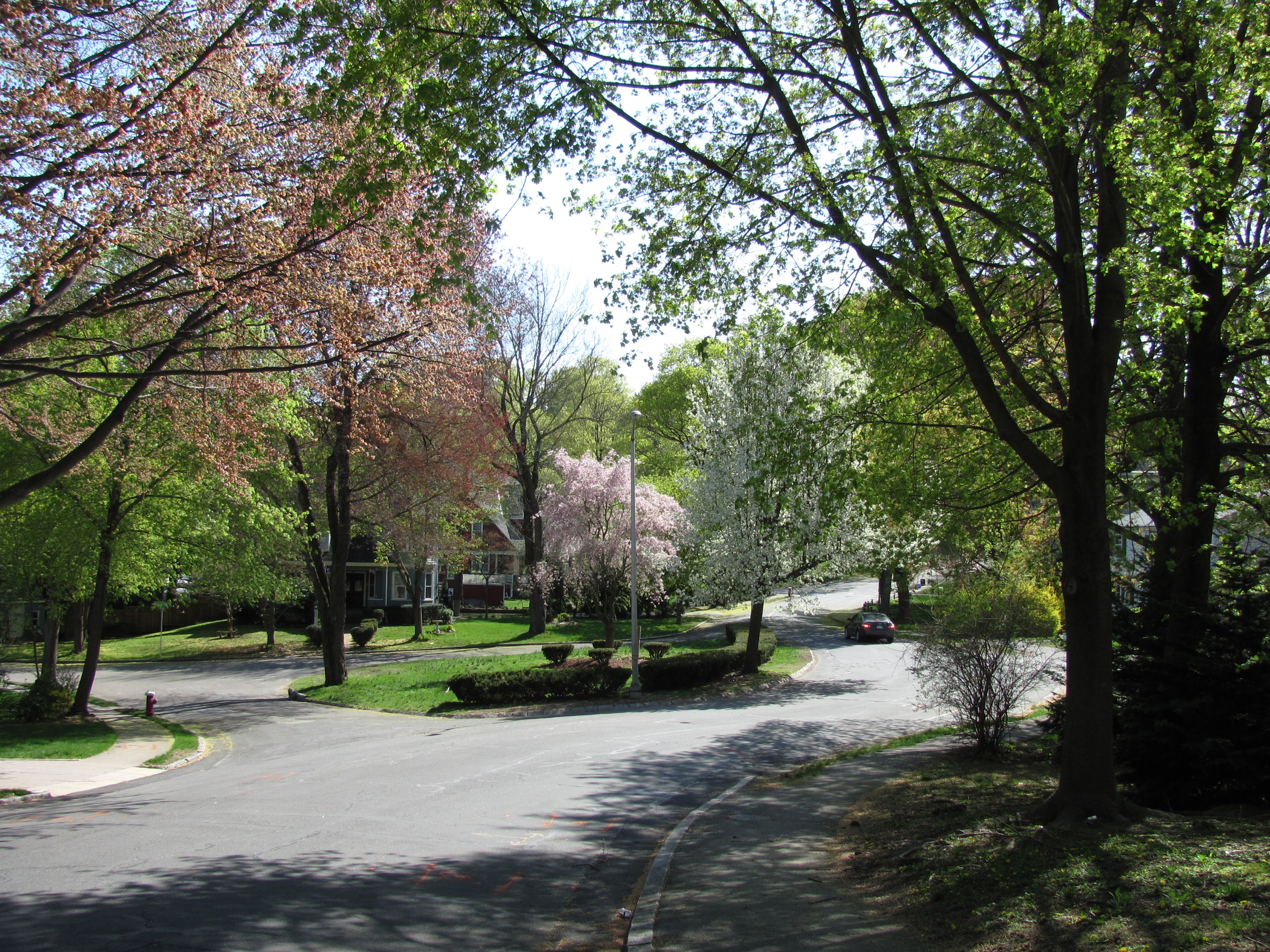
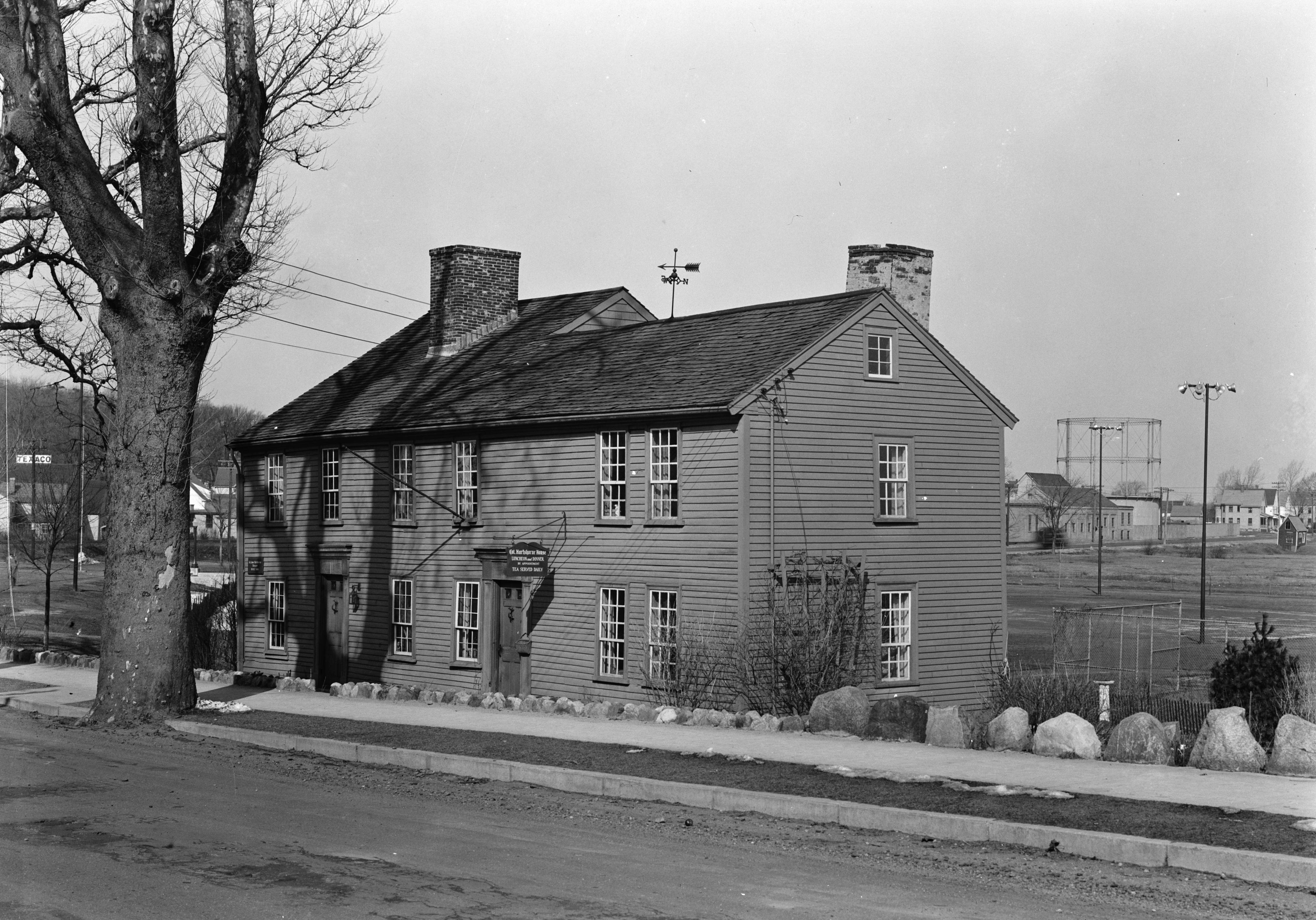
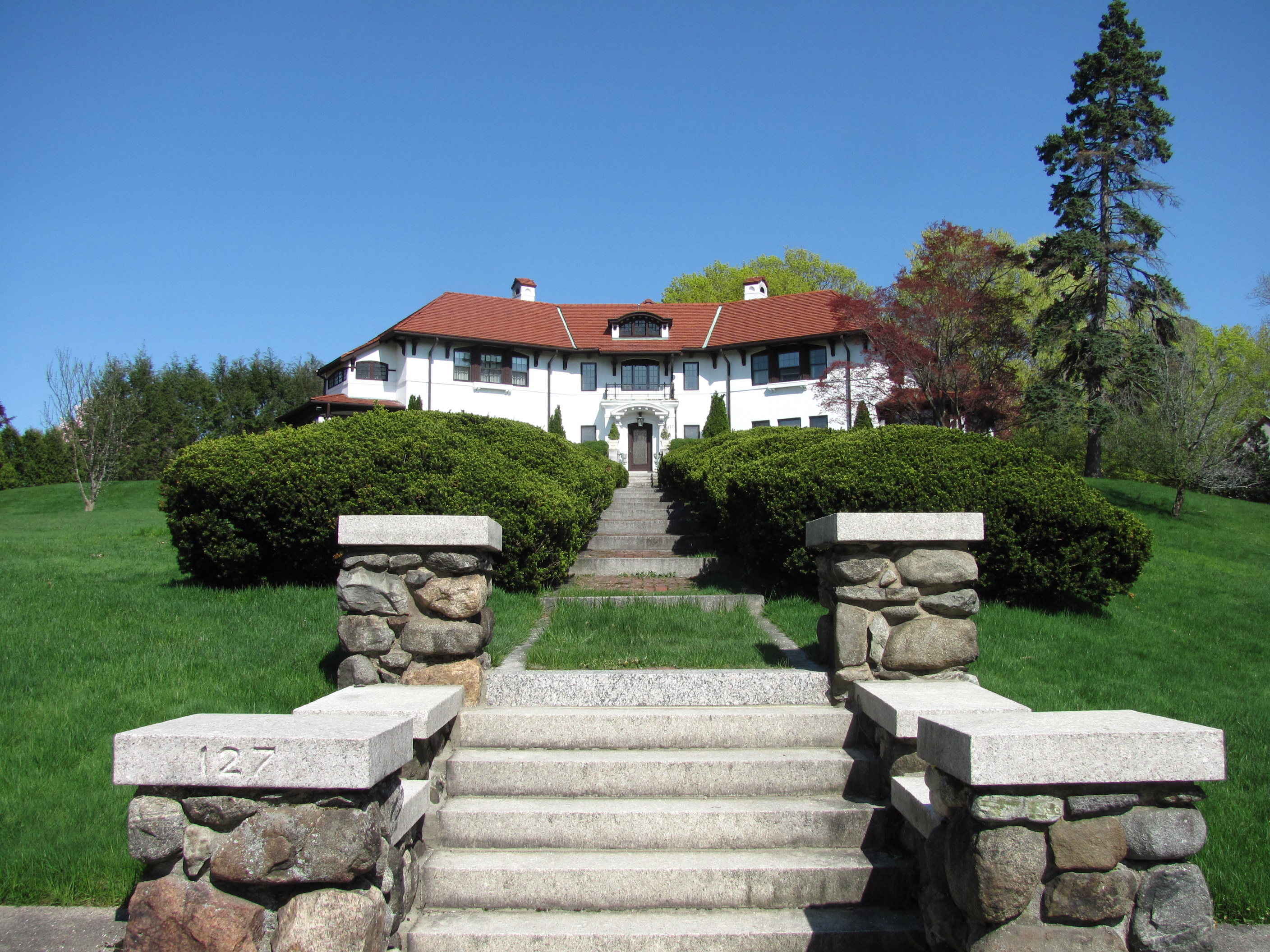
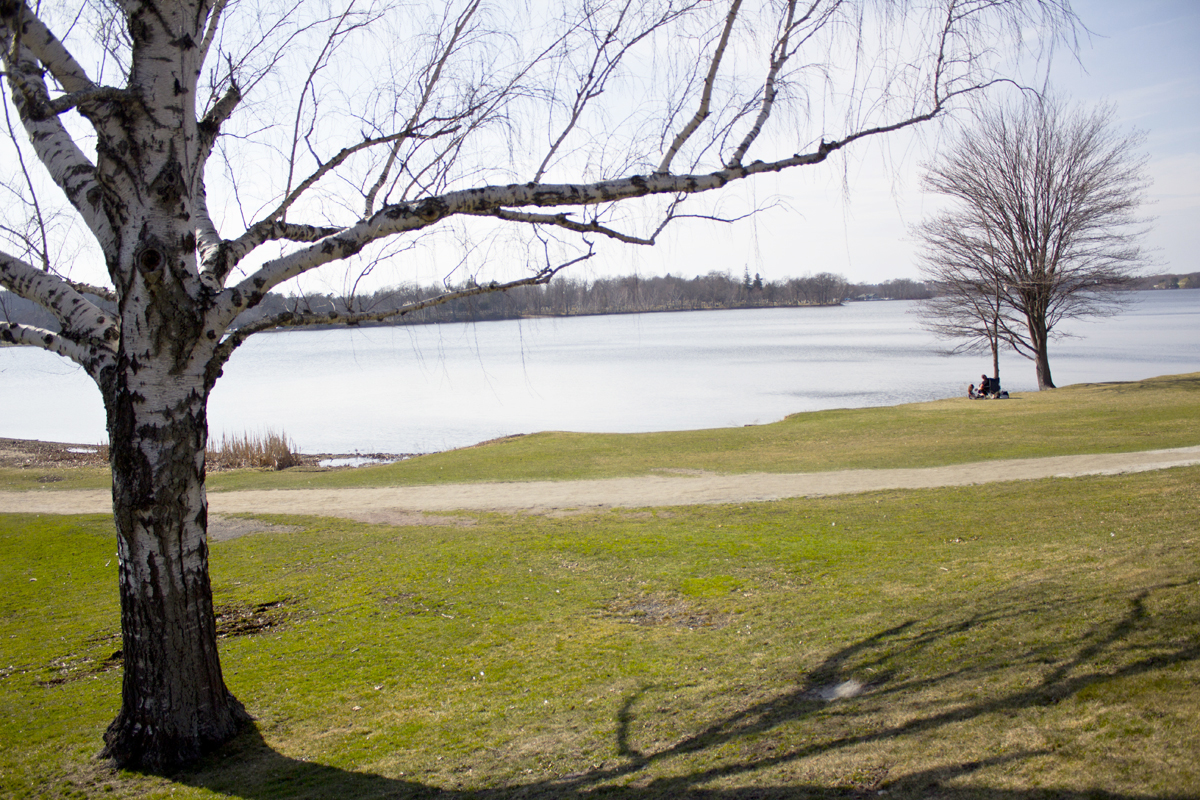
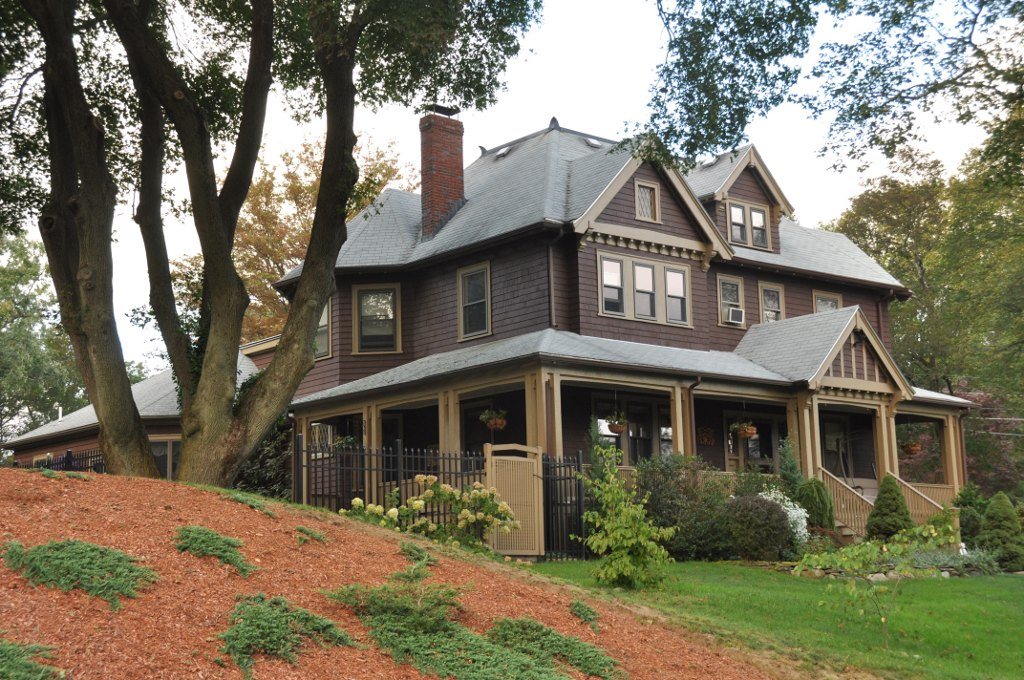
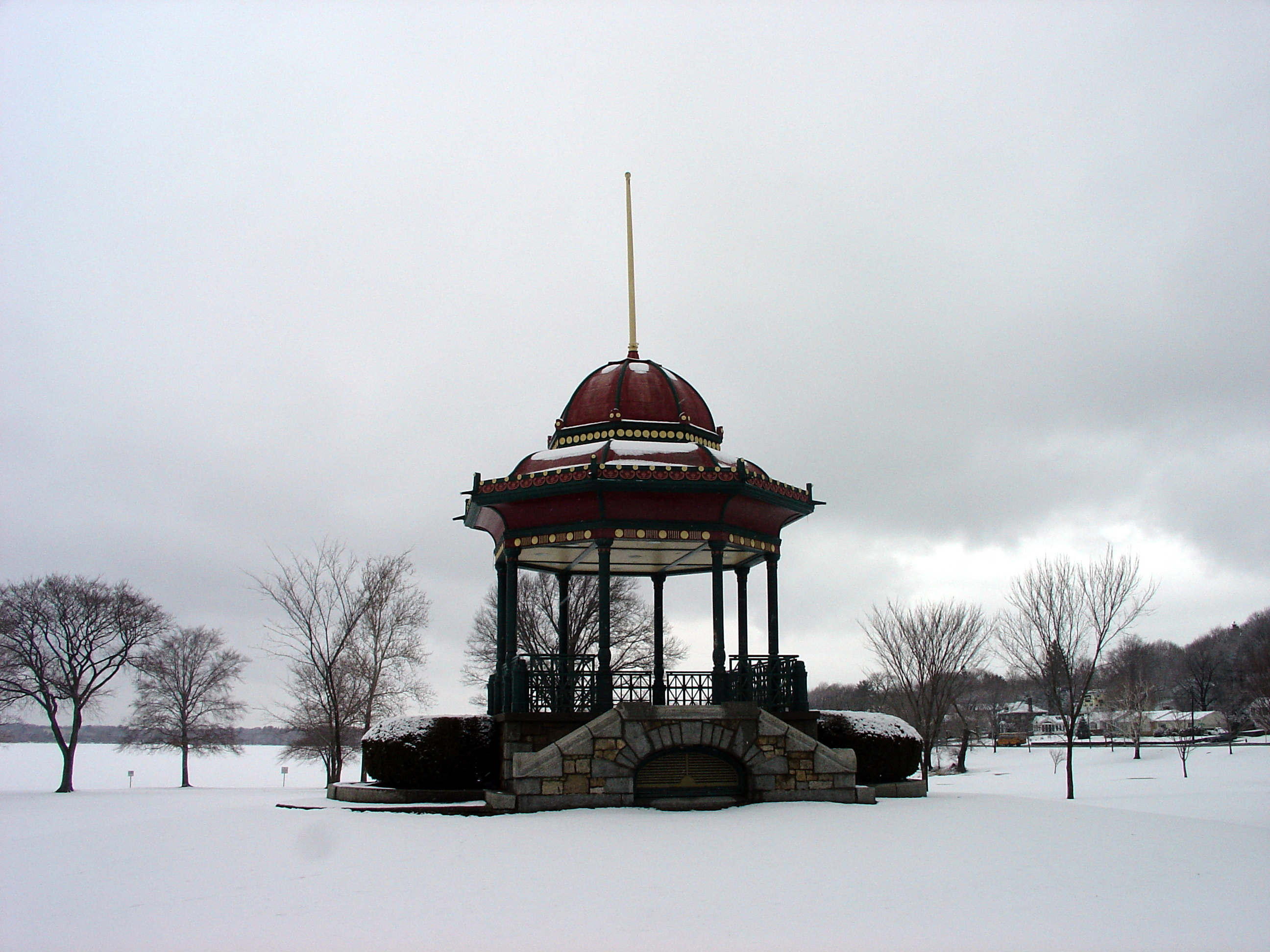
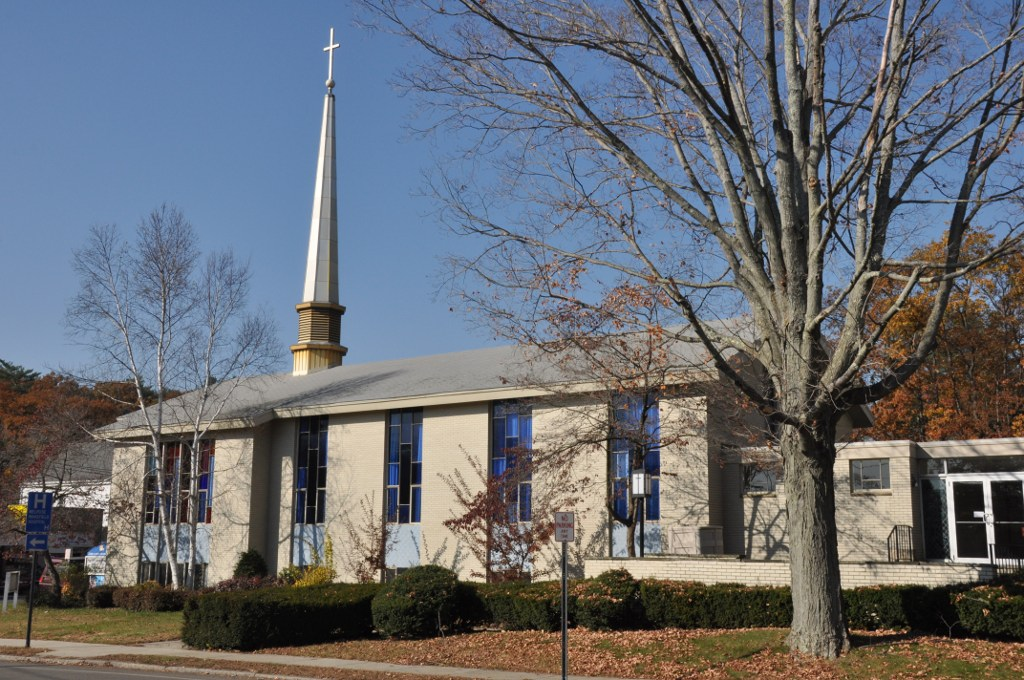
- Each row, from left to right: Softball at Veterans Field; Wakefield Common seen from Lake Quannapowitt, Upper Depot, St. Joseph School, Park Avenue; Col. James Hartshorne House, Elizabeth Boit House, Lake Quannapowitt, 1 Morrison Avenue, Lower Common Bandstand in Winter, Greenwood Union (now Restoration Road) Church

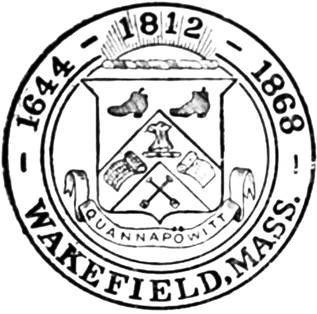
- Seal

- Location in Middlesex County in Massachusetts
- Coordinates: 42°30′23″N 71°04′24″W
- Country: United States
- State: Massachusetts
- County: Middlesex
- Region: New England
- Settled: 1638
- Incorporated: 1812
- Renamed "Wakefield": 1868
- Named for: Cyrus Wakefield

Government
  - Type: Open town meeting
  - Administrator: Denise Y. Casey
  - Board of Selectmen/Town Council: See below…
  - Town Clerk: Betsy Sheeran
  - Clerk to the Board of Selectmen: Sherri Dalton
  - Counsel: Thomas A. Mullen (Note: As of July 2, 2014.)

Area
  - Total: 7.9 sq mi (20.5 km^{2})
  - Land: 7.5 sq mi (19.3 km^{2})
  - Water: 0.42 sq mi (1.1 km^{2})
- Elevation: 98 ft (30 m)

Population (2020)
  - Total: 27,090
  - Density: 3,640/sq mi (1,400/km^{2})
  - Demonym: Wakefieldian
- Time zone: UTC-5 (Eastern)
  - Summer (DST): UTC-4 (Eastern)
- ZIP code: 01880
- Area code: 339 / 781
- FIPS code: 25-72215
- GNIS feature ID: 0619410
- Website: www.wakefieldma.gov

Wakefield is a town in Middlesex County, Massachusetts, United States, in the greater Boston metropolitan area, incorporated in 1812 and located about 12.5 mi (20.1 km) north-northwest of Downtown Boston. Wakefield's population was 27,090 at the 2020 census. Wakefield is home to Lake Quannapowitt.

== History ==
=== Settlement and 17th–18th centuries ===
Wakefield was first settled in 1638 and was originally known as Lynn Village. It officially separated from Lynn and incorporated as Reading in 1644 when the first church (First Parish Congregational Church) and the first mill were established. This first corn mill was built on the Mill River on Water Street, and later small saw mills were built on the Mill River and the Saugus River.

Thomas Parker was one of the founders of Reading, and his home was in what is now downtown Wakefield. He also was a founder of the 12th Congregational Church (now the First Parish Congregational Church), and served as deacon there. He was a selectman of Reading and was appointed a judicial commissioner. There is evidence that Parker was "conspicuous in naming the town" and that he was related to the Parker family of Little Norton, England, who owned land by the name of Ryddinge.

The old parish church became known as the Old or South Parish when, in 1713, the North Parish was established. This North Parish later became the town of North Reading. In 1769 the West Parish was established.

=== 19th century: incorporation and Wakefield identity ===
On 25 February 1812 the Old or South Parish of Reading separated from Reading and was officially incorporated as South Reading. At the time it was spelled South Redding, not South Reading. On 16 June 1813 a small part of South Reading was returned by annexation to Reading.

The railroad was chartered and built in 1844 between Wilmington and Boston. This later became the main line of the Boston and Maine Railroad. The Boston and Maine Foundry was built in 1854 and was later reincorporated as the Smith and Anthony Stove Company. The Boston Ice Company cut and shipped ice from Lake Quannapowitt starting in 1851.

On April 5, 1856 a portion of Stoneham was annexed by South Reading. The Rattan Works (which made wicker furniture) was established in 1856 by Cyrus Wakefield. This later grew into the Wakefield Rattan Company and, at one time, had a thousand employees. In 1868, Cyrus Wakefield donated land and money for a new town hall, and in appreciation, the town voted to change its name from South Reading to Wakefield, effectuated on February 25, 1868. The town hall, currently named for William J. Lee, is located at 1 Lafayette Street.

In 1856, the South Reading Public Library was established; it later became the Beebe Town Library. In 1923, the Lucius Beebe Memorial Library was built and established by Junius Beebe, the son of Lucius Beebe.

The first weekly newspaper in Wakefield was established in 1858. On March 13, 1889, a part of Stoneham was annexed by Wakefield.

=== 20th century to modern day ===
One of the oldest and largest manufacturers of flying model airplane toys in the world, Paul K. Guillow, Inc., is located in Wakefield. The company is notable for its extensive line of balsa wood model airplane kits.

Route 128 was built along the north edge of the town by 1958, and the American Mutual Insurance Company built its headquarters between Lake Quannapowitt and Route 128. American Mutual had over 1000 employees, most of them commuting to work via Route 128. By the late 1980s, American Mutual was in liquidation due to the Woburn W. R. Grace litigation. The headquarters building was sold to the Beal Company and was home to Boston Technology Inc. which invented and manufactured corporate voice mail systems that operated on computer systems. Boston Technology merged in 1997 with Comverse Technology, a digital telecommunications equipment manufacturer, which later bought the building; Wakefield became headquarters of its eventual spinoff, Comverse.

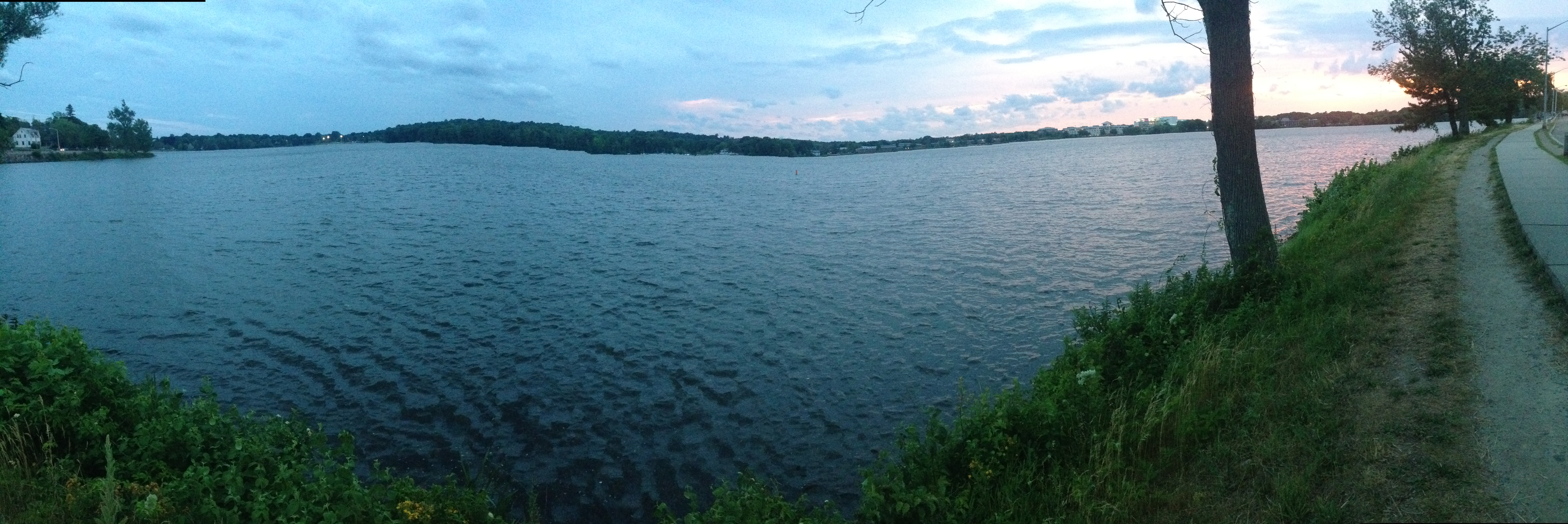
Panoramic view of Lake Quannapowitt from its eastern shore, looking westward—June 2016

The northeastern part of Wakefield was home to an amusement park, Pleasure Island, which was billed as "The Disneyland of the Northeast." The park closed in 1969 after only ten years of operation due to unseasonably cold weather that brought diminishing returns among tourists.< In April 1971, a fire burned down much of the amusement park and the area now consists of several office buildings and is called "Edgewater Park".

The bicentennial of the incorporation of Wakefield took place in 2012, whereas 2018 was the sesquicentennial of the 1868 town name change from "South Reading" to "Wakefield."

=== 2000 shooting spree ===
On December 26, 2000, seven workers at Edgewater Technology in Wakefield were shot and killed by an Edgewater Tech employee. The 42-year-old gunman was an application supporter at Edgewater Technology. During his trial, he stated that he was born without a soul and that God had allowed him to earn a soul by traveling back in time to kill Nazis. However, the prosecution asserted that the killings were motivated by his employer's garnishing of his wages to the IRS, as he failed to pay back taxes. He was found guilty of seven counts of first degree murder and sentenced to seven consecutive life sentences without the possibility of parole. In 2008 this case was studied on the psychology program Most Evil.

=== 2021 incident on Interstate 95 (I-95) ===
On July 3, 2021, armed members of the group "Rise of the Moors" were approached by police resulting in a standoff, blocking traffic along a section of I-95 that runs through Wakefield. Eleven individuals were peacefully detained, ending the incident.

== Geography ==
Wakefield is located at 42°30′4″N 71°4′16″W (42.501345, −71.071324).

Reading (northwest), Melrose (south), Stoneham (southwest), Lynnfield (northeast) and Saugus (southeast) border Wakefield. Wakefield's borders with Lynnfield and Saugus are coterminous with the Middlesex County–Essex County line.

As the crow flies, Wakefield Lower Common is located approximately 10.3 miles (16.6 km) north of Government Center, Boston, while the Wakefield–Melrose line is located about 7.95 miles (12.79 km) north.

Route 129 runs through Wakefield as its Main Street. I-95/Route 128 skirt the northwestern border of Wakefield as one road known as the "Yankee Division Highway".

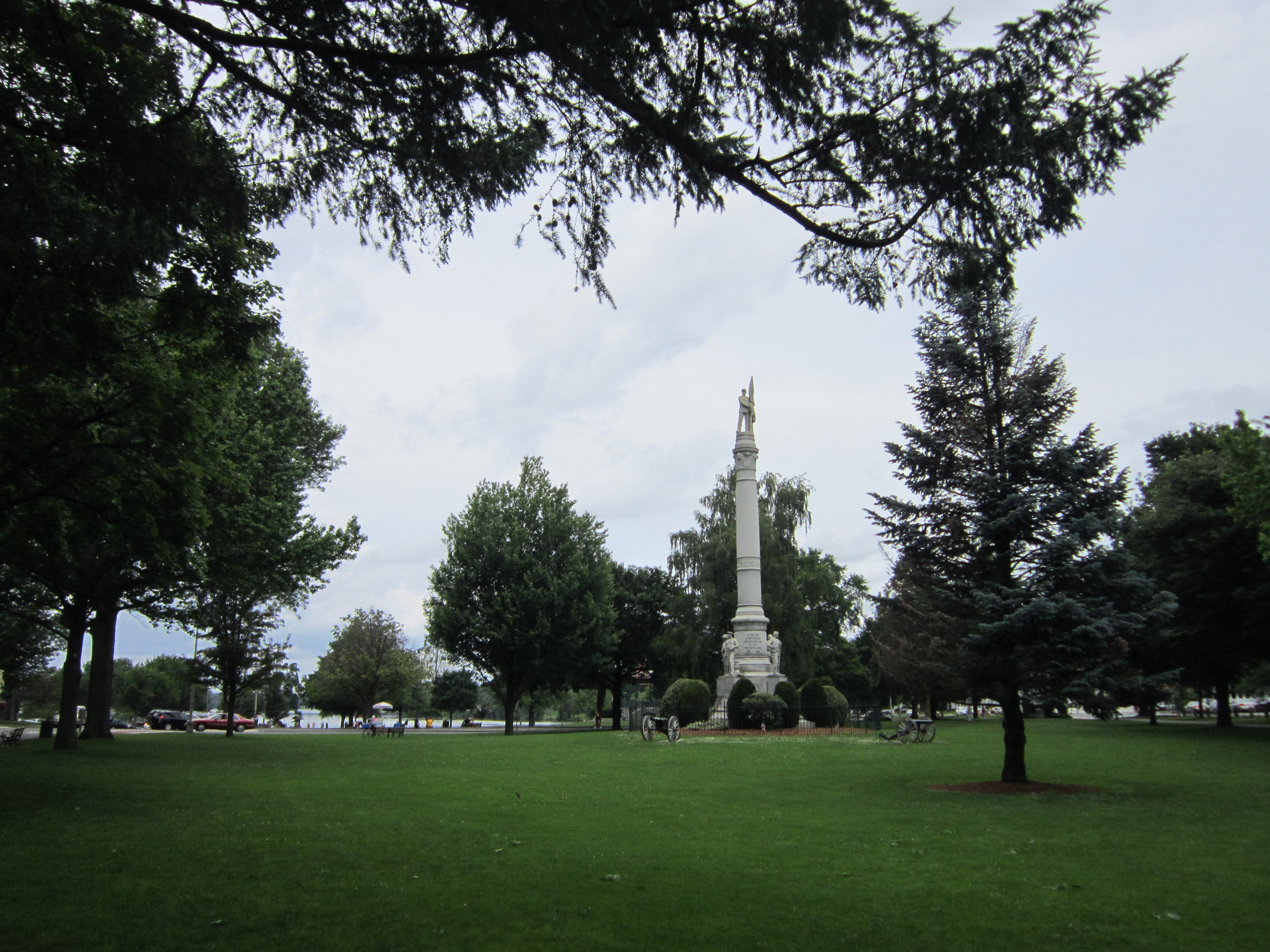
View of Wakefield's Upper Common, with Civil War memorial at center right.

According to the United States Census Bureau, the town has a total area of 7.9 square miles (20 km^{2}), of which 7.5 square miles (19 km^{2}) is land and 0.4 square miles (1.0 km^{2}), or 5.56%, is water.

Wakefield has two lakes, Crystal Lake and Lake Quannapowitt. Crystal Lake is used as a reservoir for some of the town's drinking water; as such, recreation is prohibited on Crystal Lake. Lake Quannapowitt, meanwhile, is used for a wide variety of recreational activities, including boating, windsurfing, kayaking, and fishing, and is the primary source of the Saugus River.

In 1847, Lake Quannapowitt was named for the Native American James Quannapowitt, one of the signers of the old Indian Deed of 1686. The earliest settlers referred to the lake simply as the "Greate Pond" or "Reading Pond."

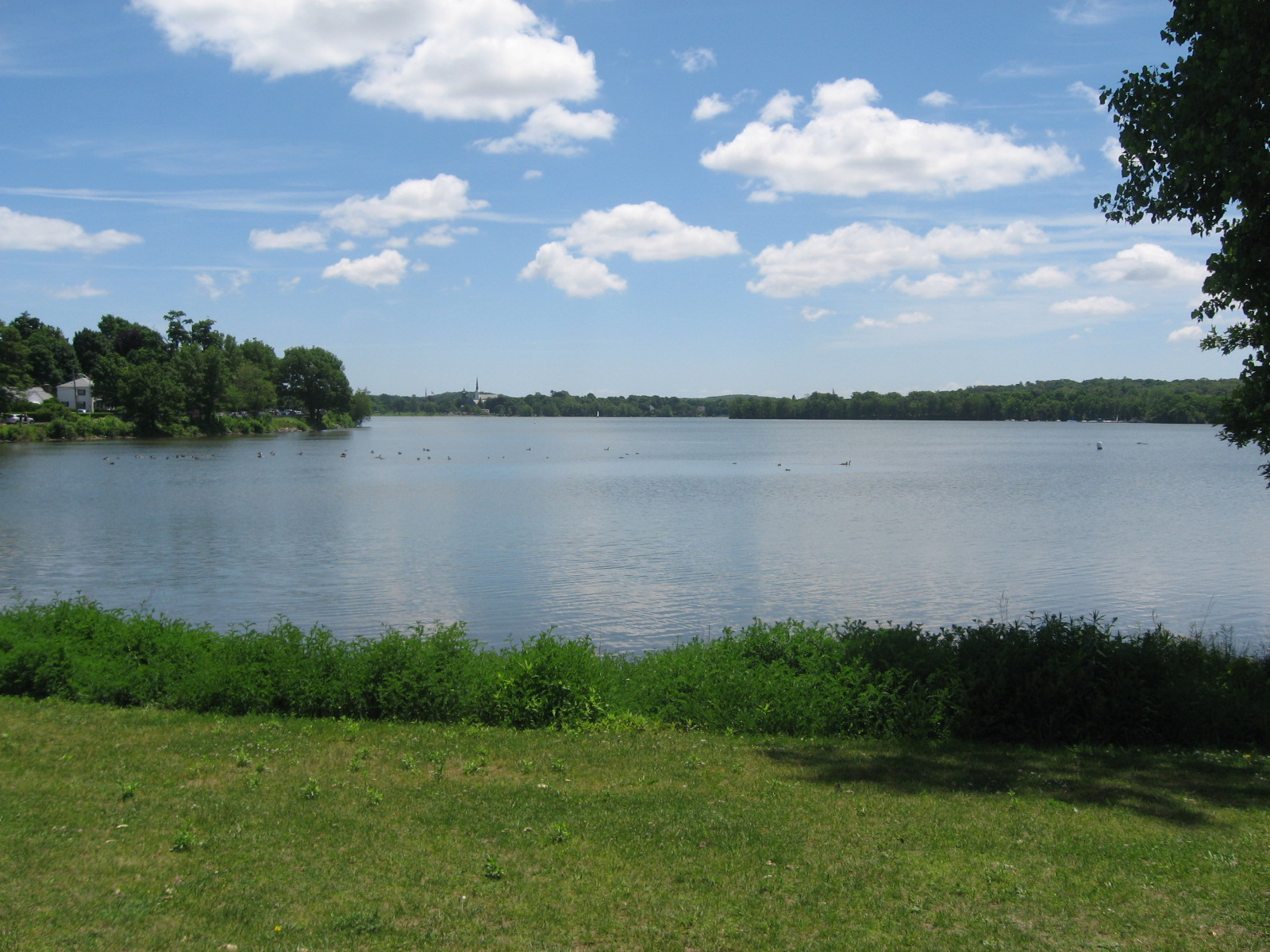
Lake Quannapowitt, seen here, is the larger of Wakefield's two principal lakes, the other being Crystal Lake.

Lake Quannapowitt is also home to the oldest inland yacht club in the United States, Quannapowitt Yacht Club, which was founded in 1886.

Lake Quannapowitt covers an area of 247 acres (1.00 km^{2}; 100 ha). Its outlet is the Saugus River to the Atlantic Ocean. Wakefield Common sits to the south of the lake, and is the site of many recreational activities and events throughout the year. In 1991, a group of local citizens formed "The Friends of Lake Quannapowitt" to advocate for the lake and to educate the public about this natural resource. The group has also raised money for projects that benefit the lake and the surrounding areas.

Since 2001, Wakefield has been recognized as an Arbor Day Foundation Tree City USA.

== Climate ==
Wakefield harbors a climate typical to the Northeastern United States, with cold, snowy winters, cool, rainy springs, cool, sunny autumns, and hot, humid summers. During the summers, many droughts occur, and lakes and other means of water supply often go down a couple of inches.

Notable recent storms

The town received, along with many other parts of Massachusetts, 2 to 3 feet (0.61 to 0.91 m) of snow during a January 2011 Nor'Easter. Wakefield also received 27.5 inches (700 mm) or 2.29 feet (0.70 m) of snow during the February 2013 Nor'Easter known as Winter Storm Nemo, and snowfall in Wakefield was unofficially reported as 29.0 inches (740 mm) or 2.42 feet (0.74 m) following the January 2015 Nor'Easter known as Winter Storm Juno.

In 2020, Wakefield suffered significant impacts from two major storms: firstly, on August 24, 2020, the town took the brunt of an exceptionally severe thunderstorm cell that included a microburst. Downed power lines, snapped trees, and a house fire caused by a lightning strike were reported, with damage being especially heavy in the town's Greenwood section. Then, on October 30, Wakefield was hit by a "Snowtober"—an unseasonable October snowstorm. The storm pelted much of Greater Boston with record setting snowfall for the month of October, exceeding the previous October high snowfall, in October 2011, by approximately two inches.

Sunlight

The earliest sunrises in Wakefield occur around the second week in June, when the sun rises at or around 5:06 a.m. The town's latest sunrises come in the first week of January, when the sun rises at or around 7:14 a.m.

The earliest sunsets in Wakefield typically occur during the second week of December, when the sun will set as early as 4:11 p.m. The town’s latest sunsets occur during the final week in June and into the first few days of July, with the sun setting at or around 8:25 p.m.

Daylengths in Wakefield range from 9 hours, 3 minutes at the winter solstice to 15 hours, 18 minutes at the summer solstice.

Climate data for Wakefield, Massachusetts
Month	Jan	Feb	Mar	Apr	May	Jun	Jul	Aug	Sep	Oct	Nov	Dec	Year
Mean daily maximum °F (°C)	35 (2)	38 (3)	46 (8)	56 (13)	67 (19)	77 (25)	82 (28)	80 (27)	73 (23)	62 (17)	51 (11)	40 (4)	59 (15)
Mean daily minimum °F (°C)	15 (−9)	18 (−8)	26 (−3)	35 (2)	45 (7)	54 (12)	60 (16)	59 (15)	50 (10)	39 (4)	31 (−1)	21 (−6)	38 (3)
Average precipitation inches (mm)	4.36 (111)	3.57 (91)	4.37 (111)	4.17 (106)	3.85 (98)	3.64 (92)	3.66 (93)	3.50 (89)	3.82 (97)	4.47 (114)	4.64 (118)	4.36 (111)	48.31 (1,227)
Source: Wakefield Weather – Wakefield, MA - Weather Data – Normal Temperatures and Normal Precipitation at IDcide

== Demographics ==
Historic populations for Wakefield, Massachusetts, 1850—present
Year	Pop.	±%
1850	2,407	—
1860	3,207	+33.2%
1870	4,135	+28.9%
1880	5,547	+34.1%
1890	6,982	+25.9%
1900	9,290	+33.1%
1910	11,404	+22.8%
1920	13,025	+14.2%
1930	16,318	+25.3%
1940	16,223	−0.6%
1950	19,633	+21.0%
1960	24,295	+23.7%
1970	25,402	+4.6%
1980	24,895	−2.0%
1990	24,825	−0.3%
2000	24,804	−0.1%
2010	24,932	+0.5%
2020	27,090	+8.7%
2024*	29,216	+7.8%
* = population estimate. Source: United States Census records and Population Estimates Program data.

=== 2010 U.S. Census demographics ===
As of the census of 2010, there were 24,932 people, 9,994 households, 10,500 housing units, and 6,547 families residing in the Town of Wakefield.

==== Racial makeup, 2010 ====
The racial makeup of the Town in 2010 was:

- 94.5% (23,573) White
- 0.9% (229) Black or African American
- 0.1% (30) Native American and Alaska Native
- 2.6% (660) Asian (the leading Asian nationalities being Chinese with 1.1% or 267 people and Indian with 0.7% or 174 people)
- 0.0% (0) Pacific Islander
- 0.6% (150) from other races
- 1.2% (290) from two or more races.

Hispanic or Latino of any race were 2.3% (575) of the population.

==== Household statistics, 2010 ====
In the town in 2010, there were 9,994 households, out of which:

- 28.3% (2,825) had children under the age of 18 living with them
- 52.7% (5,265) were a husband and a wife living together
- 3.2% (323) had a male householder with no wife present
- 9.6% (959) had a female householder with no husband present.

The average household size was 2.47 and the average family size was 3.07.

==== Age classifications, 2010 ====
In the town in 2010, the population was spread out agewise with:

- 5.6% (1,401) under the age of 5 years
- 5.9% (1,478) between the ages of 5 and 9
- 6.2% (1,534) between the ages of 10 and 14
- 5.5% (1,365) between the ages of 15 and 19
- 4.7% (1,176) between the ages of 20 and 24
- 6.1% (1,530) between the ages of 25 and 29
- 6.2% (1,534) between the ages of 30 and 34
- 6.8% (1,705) between the ages of 35 and 39
- 7.9% (1,981) between the ages of 40 and 44
- 8.6% (2,137) between the ages of 45 and 49
- 8.3% (2,066) between the ages of 50 and 54
- 7.3% (1,816) between the ages of 55 and 59
- 6.2% (1,538) between the ages of 60 and 64
- 4.2% (1,039) between the ages of 65 and 69
- 3.3% (811) between the ages of 70 and 74
- 2.5% (633) between the ages of 75 and 79
- 2.4% (607) between the ages of 80 and 84
- 2.3% (581) aged 85 years or older.

The median age was 41.9 years, 40.6 for males and 43.0 for females.

=== 2007–2008 demographics ===
The population of Wakefield was 24,915 as of July 2007. The town's population was composed of 11,814 (47.4%) males and 13,101 (52.6%) females. The median resident age was 38.9 years, higher than the Massachusetts median age of 36.5.

In 2008, the median household income was $85,011, about $20,000 above Massachusetts as a whole. The estimated income per capita was $39,918. The estimated median property value in 2008 was $416,592, up from $240,300 in 2000, representing a $176,292 increase.

==== Racial makeup, 2007–2008 ====
Racially, Wakefield broke down as:

- 96.4% White
- 1.4% Asian
- 0.8% Hispanic
- 0.4% African American
- 0.01% Native Hawaiian and Other Pacific Islander
- 0.8% from two or more races.

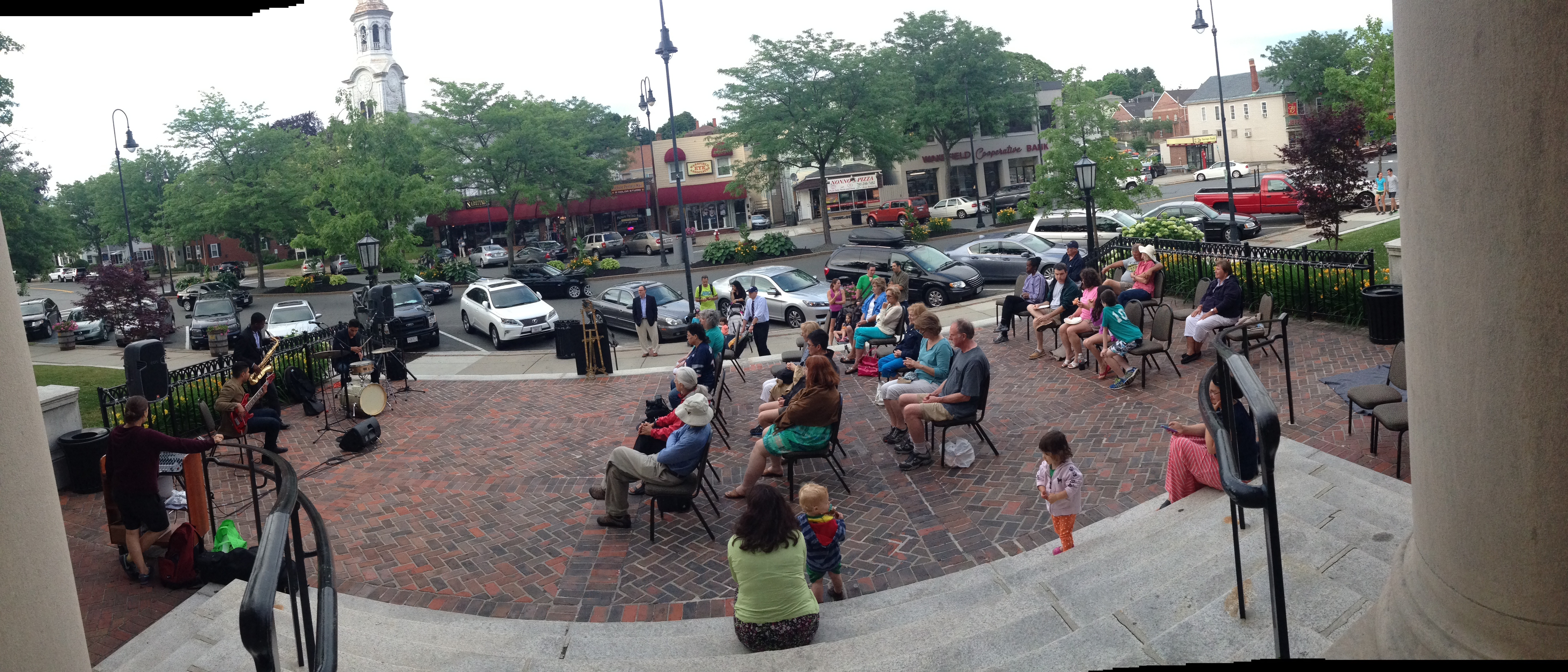
A jazz concert on the steps of Lucius Beebe Memorial Library on June 26, 2014, with Main Street in Downtown Wakefield in the background.

==== Ancestry breakdown, 2007–2008 ====
Ancestries in Wakefield broke down thus

- 33% Irish
- 28.5% Italian
- 13.4% English
- 6.3% French
- 5.5% German
- 4.8% French Canadian

The cost of living index was listed as 121.4, 21.4 points above the U.S. average.

=== 2000 U.S. Census demographics ===
As of the census of 2000, there were 24,804 people, 9,747 households, and 6,608 families residing in the town. The population density was 3,321.6 inhabitants per square mile (1,282.5/km^{2}). There were 9,937 housing units at an average density of 1,330.7 per square mile (513.8/km^{2}). The racial makeup of the town was 96.94% White, 0.45% Black or African American, 0.08% Native American, 1.43% Asian, 0.01% Pacific Islander, 0.20% from other races, and 0.90% from two or more races.

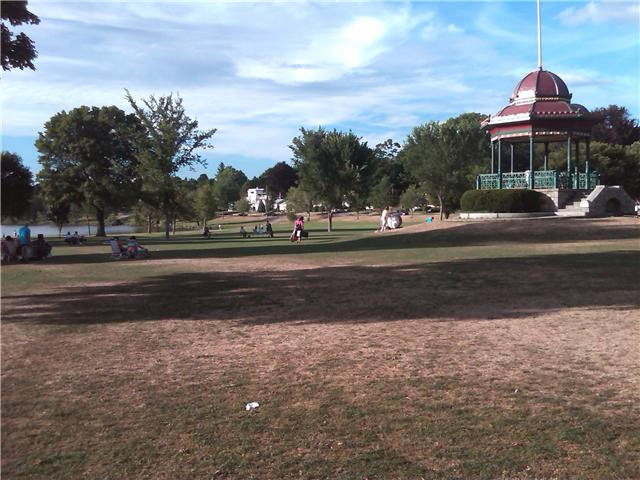
Wakefield Lower Common as seen on July 9, 2010; Lake Quannapowitt is visible at far left. This photo was taken shortly before a Wakefield Summer Band concert; note the large bass drum being carried at center right. The brown color of the grass is somewhat unusual and likely a product of a mild drought that occurred throughout much of New England in the summer of 2010.

Hispanic or Latino of any race were 0.82% of the population.

There were 9,747 households, out of which 30.2% had children under the age of 18 living with them, 55.1% were married couples living together, 9.7% had a female householder with no husband present, and 32.2% were non-families. 26.4% of all households were made up of individuals, and 10.6% had someone living alone who was 65 years of age or older. The average household size was 2.52 and the average family size was 3.09.

In the town, the population was spread out, with 22.6% under the age of 18, 5.8% from 18 to 24, 32.7% from 25 to 44, 23.8% from 45 to 64, and 15.1% who were 65 years of age or older. The median age was 39 years. For every 100 females, there were 90.2 males. For every 100 females age 18 and over, there were 87.8 males.

The median income for a household in the town was $66,117, and the median income for a family was $77,834. Males had a median income of $51,591 versus $39,327 for females. The per capita income for the town was $30,369. About 1.7% of families and 3.1% of the population were below the poverty line, including 1.7% of those under age 18 and 4.6% of those age 65 or over.

== Government ==
Wakefield holds yearly major town meetings to discuss the budget. As it is a town, not a city, Wakefield's main decisions are made, in the New England style, by a Board of Selectmen, which works in collaboration with a town administrator. Denise Y. Casey is the town administrator as of October 6, 2025. Previous administrator Stephen Maio retired in July 2025 after 17 years in the position. Then-Assistant Town Administrator Kevin Gill was tapped to serve as interim Administrator beginning July 4, and on August 18 the Town Council appointed Casey, then the Deputy Town Administrator of North Andover, as the new Town Administrator pending contract negotiations. Administrator Maio hosted a "Town Administrator's Report" monthly on the public-access television cable TV station, WCAT-TV (about which more below).

A number of other matters are handled by different committees in the town, such as the Finance Committee, or FinCom, the Zoning Board of Appeals, and the School Board. The Town Hall houses the office of the Town Administrator and the Finance Committee, as well as other town boards and offices. Board of Selectmen/Town Council meetings, formerly held at the Town Hall, have in recent years moved to the studios of WCAT-TV.

=== List of Wakefield Governmental Positions ===
List of Wakefield Governmental Positions
Title	Name
Town Accountant	Elizabeth Rourke
Animal Control Officer	Kenneth Stache
Assessor	Victor Santaniello
Beebe Library; Director	Catherine McDonald
Finance Director	Kevin Gill
Health Director	Anthony Chui
Building Inspector	Benjamin DeChristoforo
Cemetery Division	Dennis Fazio
Forestry Division	Dennis Fazio
Parks Division	Dennis Fazio
Community and Economic Development; Manager	Erin Kokinda
Council on Aging; Executive Director	Judy Luciano
DPW Director	Joseph Conway
Emergency; Management Director	Thomas P. Walsh Jr.
Human; Resources Manager	Amy Forziati
Wakefield Fire; Department (WFD) Chief	Michael Sullivan
Fleet Division	Andrew Chankhour
Information Technology; Department Director	Todd Bowden
Wakefield Municipal Gas & Light Department (WMGLD) Manager	Peter Dion
Parking Clerk	Kenneth Stache
Wakefield Police; Department (WPD) Chief	Steven Skory
Wakefield Recreation; Department Director	Dan McGrath
Wakefield Retirement; Board Administrator	Cathy Cheek
Wakefield Public Schools; Superintendent; Assistant Superintendent	Douglas Lyons; Kara Mauro
Tax Collector	Kathleen Kelly
Town Administrator	Denise Y. Casey
Town Clerk; Town Counsel	Betsy Sheeran; Thomas Mullen
Town Moderator	William Carroll
Town Planner	Paul Reavis
Town Treasurer	John J. McCarthy, Jr.
Veterans' Services	Dave Mangan
Wakefield Housing; Authority	Sandra Gass
Water and Sewer Supervisor	Steven Fitzpatrick
As of January 2026

=== Town Council (fmrly. Board of Selectmen) ===
The Board of Selectmen was the name of Wakefield's primary governing body until it changed its name to the "Town Council" in 2018 in an effort to maintain gender neutrality. Since that time, "Selectmen" have been called "Councilors." A single Councilor term lasts for three years; barring special elections, annual town elections take place each April. The Town Council consisted of, as of January 2026, Chair Mehreen Butt, Vice-Chair Jonathan Chines, Douglas S. Butler, John F. Carney, Stacey Constas, John Crisley, and Brian Fox. with Sherri A. Dalton as clerk to the Town Council, and Thomas Mullen as town counsel.

==== Recent Town Elections ====
===== 2012–2016 =====
2012–2016 Selectmen Elections

2012

Brian Falvey replaced Albert Turco, who did not seek re-election, in a Selectmen's seat in town elections of April 24, 2012, and Paul R. DiNocco renewed a term for three years.

2013

In 2013, Selectmen John B. Encarnacao and James E. Good announced that they would not seek reelection. Vice Chair Tiziano Doto was reelected to a three-year term while former Board of Health member Ann Santos won a seat. Former Selectwoman Phyllis Hull returned to the Board with a term lasting through 2016.

2014

In 2014, Selectmen Patrick S. Glynn and Betsy Sheeran ran in a three-way election against one challenger, Roland A. Cote. Both Glynn and Sheeran renewed their terms through 2017.

2016 (April)

Phyllis Hull and Ann Santos both ran for re-election on April 26, 2016, in a field of five. Santos renewed her term; Hull lost out to new Board of Selectmen add-on Anthony J. Longo and Peter J. May.

2016 Special Election (July)

A vacancy on the Board of Selectmen was filled by a Special Town Election held on July 19, 2016. The candidates to fill the vacancy were announced as Daniel L. Benjamin, Jr., Mehreen N. Butt, Christopher J. Callanan, Nathaniel David Gayman, Allyson Gael Houghton, and Phyllis J. Hull. Hull won the election by 31 votes, avenging her defeat of three months prior and filling a vacant seat on the Board of Selectmen. Hull's new term lasted through April 2017.

===== 2017–2020 =====
2017–2020 Selectmen/Town Council elections

2017

The 2017 town election was held Tuesday, April 25, 2017. The only incumbent Selectperson on the ballot in this election cycle was Phyllis J. Hull, who was defeated by the two top vote getters, Edward Dombroski Jr. and Mehreen N. Butt.

2018

In the 2018 town election, held on Tuesday, April 24, 2018, two seats were up for election. Paul R. DiNocco renewed his Selectman's seat while a newcomer to the Wakefieldian political scene, Julie Smith-Galvin, defeated incumbent Selectman Brian Falvey.

2019

Three seats for Town Councilors were to be decided in 2019. Ann Santos and Peter J. May, both incumbents, renewed their terms through 2022. However, Anthony Longo was voted off of the Board of Selectmen/Town Council after receiving fewer votes than the only new member to be elected in 2019, Jonathan Chines.

2020

In 2020, Councilors Mehreen N. Butt and Edward F. Dombroski, Jr., held the only open seats. Both cruised to re-election in a race in which each ran virtually unopposed, with no competition except for write-in candidates, and renewed their terms through 2023.

===== 2021–2024 =====
2021–2024 Selectmen/Town Council Elections

2021

The 2021 race featured a three-way battle between one incumbent, one Finance Committee member, and one newcomer. Town Councillor Julie Smith-Galvin and Finance Committee member Anne P. Danehy received a plurality of votes, knocking hopeful Brandon Flanagan out of the race. The 2021 election also featured a heated ballot question over whether or not to keep the Wakefield Warriors logo and mascot; voters chose to maintain the status quo, 2,851–2,337.

2022

Newcomer Robert E. Vincent was voted onto the Town Council in 2022, and incumbents Jonathan Chines and Michael J. McLane were re-elected, renewing their terms through 2025. Aspirant Katie Dolan, the lone woman in the race, finished fourth.

2023

In 2023, Wakefieldians voted in a three-way race that pitted incumbents Mehreen N. Butt and Edward F. Dombroski, Jr., in a re-election campaign against newcomer Christopher J. Carino. Butt and Dombroski easily defeated Carino—Butt by nearly 600 votes, Dombroski by over 1,100 votes—renewing their terms through 2026.

2024

The 2024 Wakefield Town Elections were held on Tuesday, April 23, 2024. Two Town Council seats were made available in a three-way race. Incumbent Douglas S. Butler received the most votes, renewing his Town Council set through 2027. The second open seat, being vacated by Julie Smith-Galvin, was contested between John F. Carney and Allyson Gael Houghton. In receiving the second-most votes behind Butler, Carney was elected to Smith-Galvin's seat, defeating Houghton by just 24 votes.

===== 2025– =====
2025

The 2025 Wakefield Town Election was held on Tuesday, April 22, 2025. John Crisley and Stacey Constas were the candidates elected to three-year terms lasting through 2028, whereas Jonathan Chines renewed his term.

On June 24, 2025, a special election was held to fill a Council vacancy. Brian E. Fox emerged victorious in the three-way race over Gerard Leeman and Samuel Hockenbury.

2026

The 2026 Wakefield Town Election will be held on Tuesday, April 28, 2026, with two seats on the Town Council up for grabs.

=== Finance Committee ===
The Finance Committee, is responsible for matters of finance in the town and for setting a budget for the town and its various departments to follow. The fifteen-member committee is composed of, as of May 2026, Chairman James Sullivan, Vice Chairman Stefan Chase, Joseph Bertrand, Tarae Howell, Edward Bean, Brian Cusack, Dennis Hogan, William J. Boodry, Jr., Christian Jensen, Lorri Wheeler, Donald Ravenelle, Evan Kenney, Aimee Forsythe, Daniel W. Sherman, and Ellie Zuccaro.

=== Board of Appeals ===
The Wakefield Board of Appeals, alternately known as the Zoning Board of Appeals (ZBA), holds hearings on the second and fourth Wednesday of every month and as of April 2025 consisted of five members: Michael Feeley, Joseph Pride, David Hatfield, Charles Tarbell, and Chairman Thomas Lucey, with Kirstin Brown, Gregory Demerjian, and Kasumi Humphries as associate members.

=== Fence viewers ===
Although a somewhat antiquated position, the town of Wakefield, in accordance with other towns in the state of Massachusetts, appoints townspeople to positions of fence viewers. Fence viewers serve advisory positions to property owners before a fence is built on or dividing properties. As of April 2025, John Sofia and Shaun Santos serve as fence viewers in Wakefield.

=== World War II Memorial Committee ===
The Town of Wakefield tasked a fifteen-member committee headed by Selectwoman Phyllis Hull to oversee the construction of a World War II Veterans' Memorial on the Upper Common. The memorial includes the names of 72 Wakefieldians who lost their lives during World War II, as well as names of all other Wakefieldians who served in the war. The creation of the committee overseeing the project was authorized in 2007, and the memorial was completed in 2011 and unveiled on Veterans Day, November 11, 2011.

== Health ==
MelroseWakefield Hospital (formerly Melrose-Wakefield Hospital), a Level II trauma center, is located to the south of Wakefield in nearby Melrose (approximately 3.2 miles (5.1 km) south of the Town Center and 1.5 miles (2.4 km) south of Greenwood) and serves both the town of Wakefield and city of Melrose.

=== Board of Health ===
The Wakefield Board of Health (BOH) legislates health policy within the town. As of May 2026, the three-member board is composed of Chair Candace Linehan, Vice-Chair Marcy McCauley, and Elaine Silva. The BOH works in concert with the Health Department and Health and Human Services Director Anthony Chui.

=== Wakefield and COVID-19 ===
Cases

As of March 10, 2022, Wakefield had reported 5,795 cases of COVID-19 over the course of the COVID-19 pandemic. These numbers were indicative of a winter surge exacerbated by the Omicron variant. 1,205 student cases were reported since Wakefield Public Schools reopened in September 2021. Likely as a result of some individuals getting tested multiple times, the number of tests administered in the town was at last count more than double the population (26,399 est.) of the town itself.

Vaccinations

As of March 10, 2022, 21,425 Wakefieldians, or about 79% of the town population, had been fully vaccinated against COVID-19. An additional 2,044 townspeople had received one dose of a two-dose vaccine. In total, as of March 10, 2022, 23,469 Wakefieldians had been at least partially inoculated against COVID-19.

Town government response

Like much of Massachusetts, Wakefield conducted largely successful public health and safety campaigns regarding quarantining and mask wearing, and achieved a high percentage of immunity once vaccines were rolled out beginning in 2021. In February 2022, the Wakefield Board of Health voted to rescind the town's mask mandate for public indoor spaces and municipal buildings effective February 18, 2022. Shortly thereafter, the town announced it would no longer be updating COVID-19 case counts due to the rise of at-home antigen testing, which was making the town's reports less accurate.

== Education ==
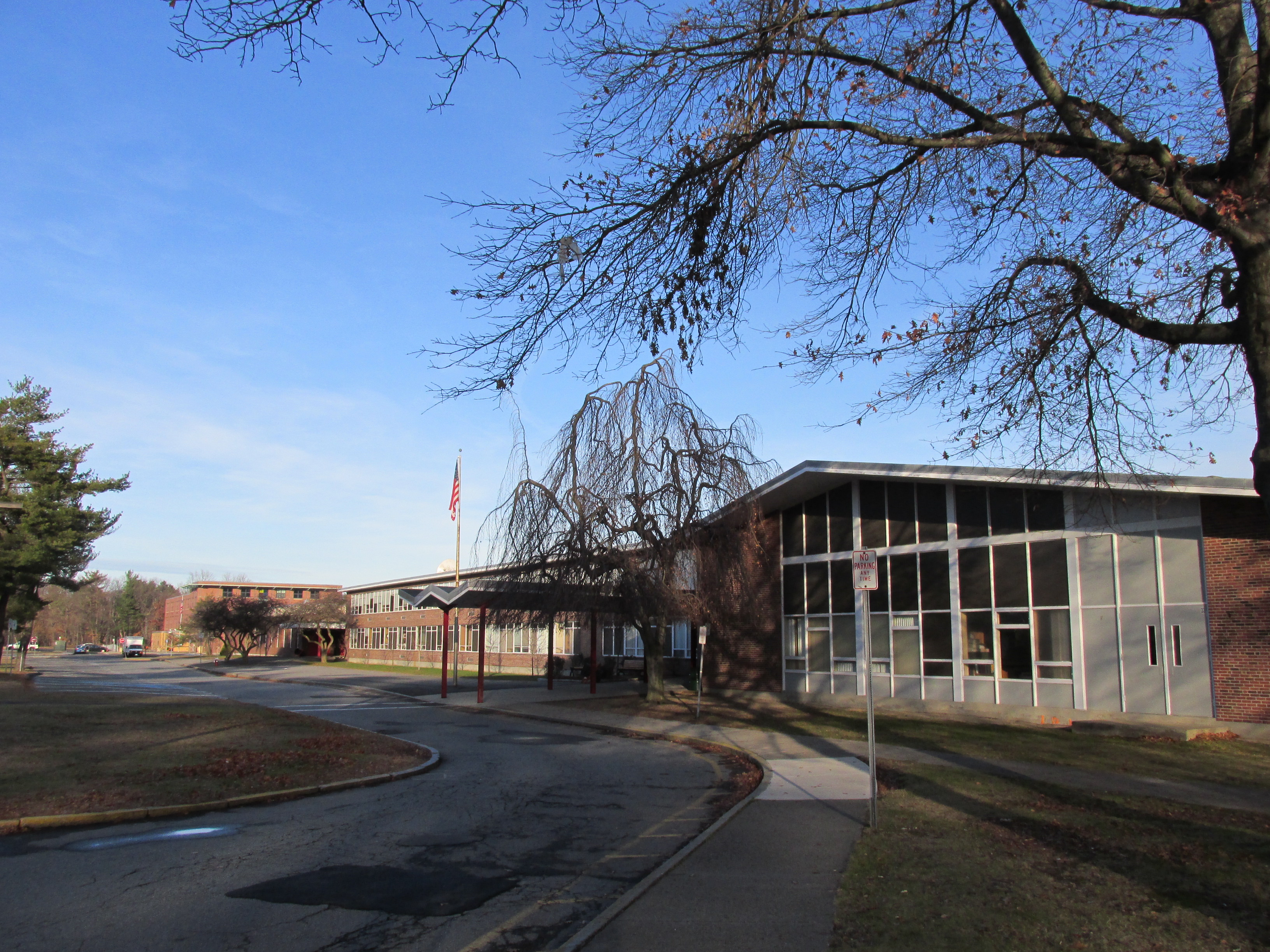
Wakefield High School, as seen in December 2012.

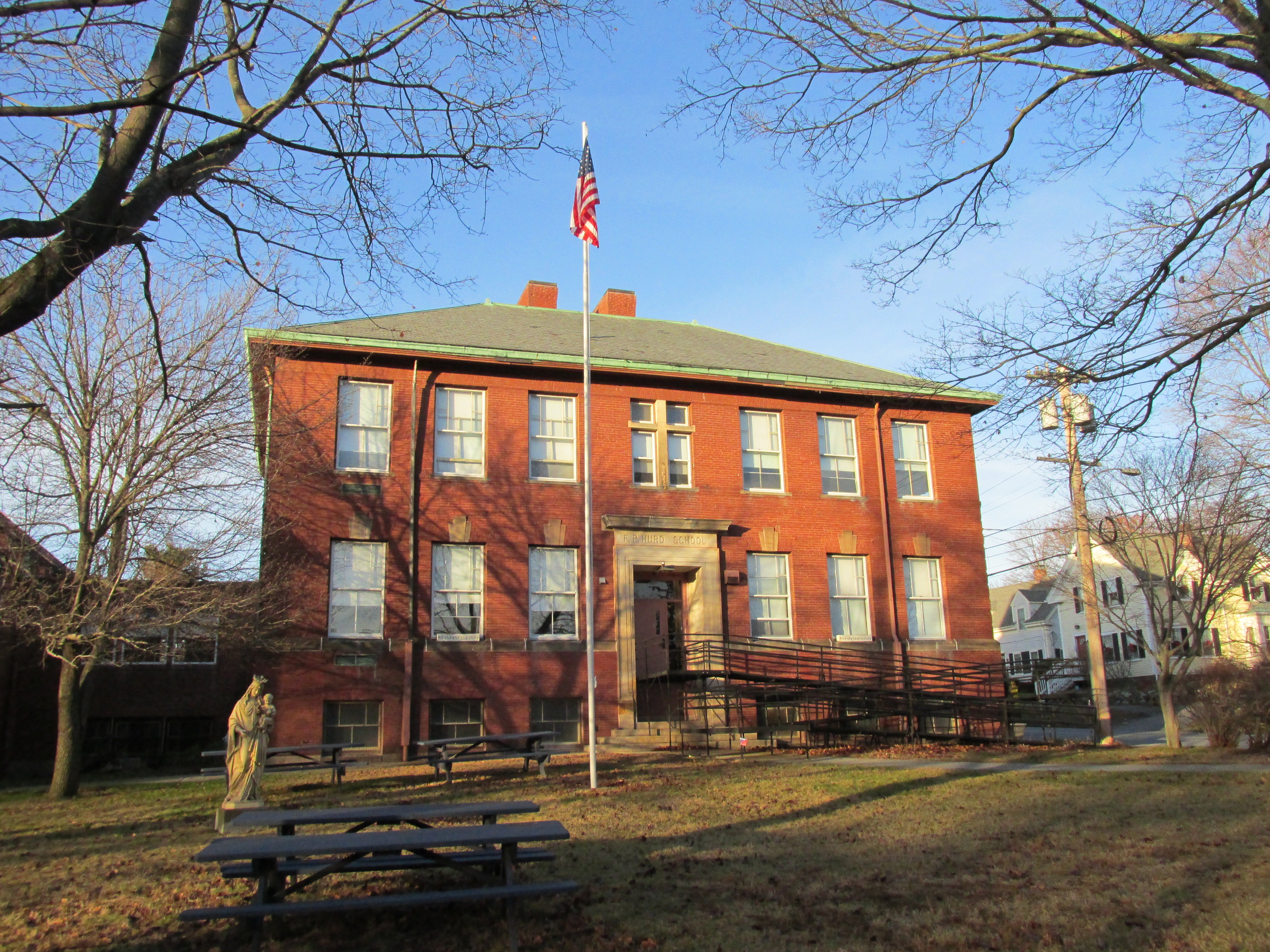
The former Nazareth Academy, as seen in December 2012.

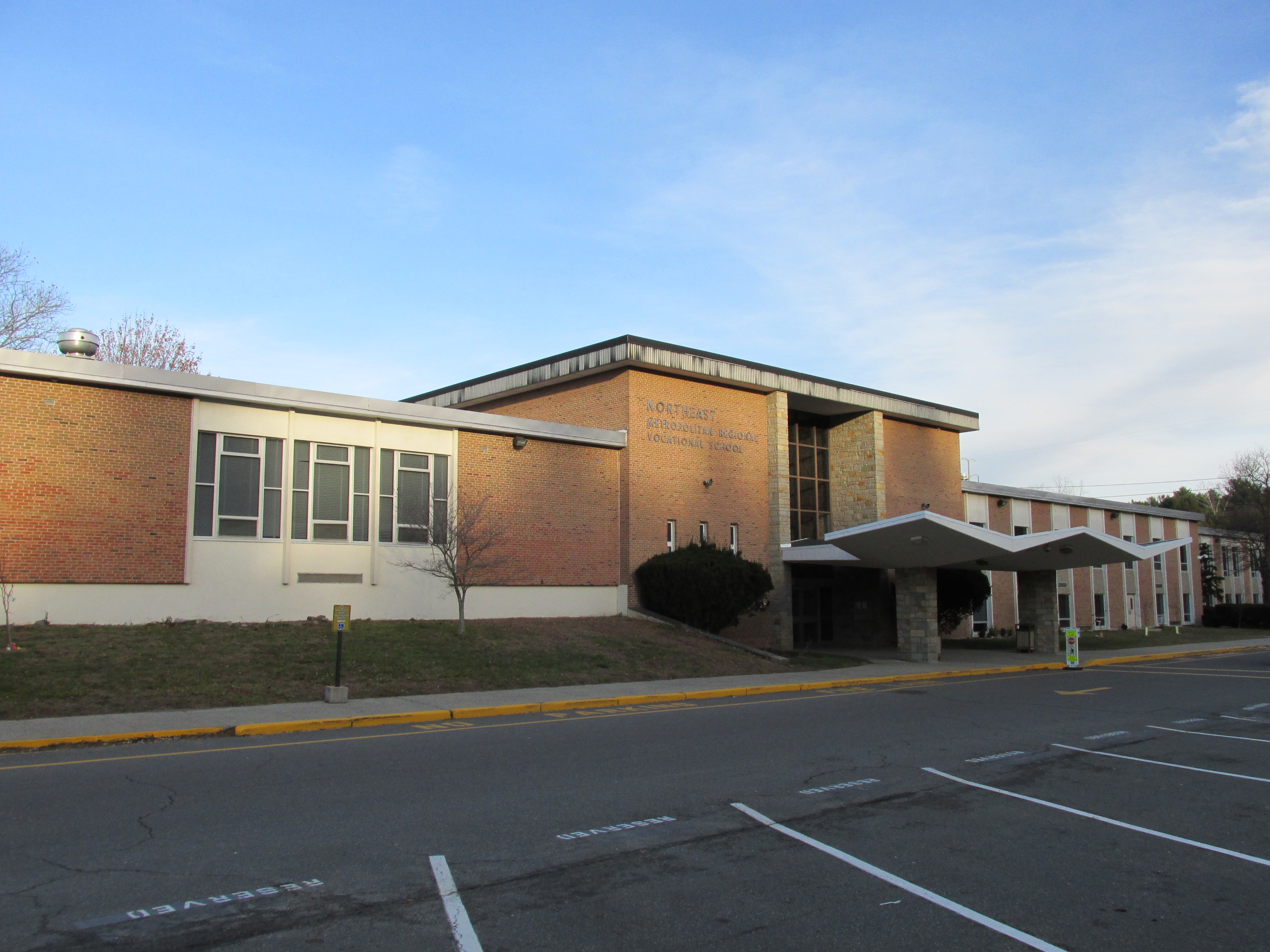
Northeast Metro Regional Vocational School, as seen in December 2012.

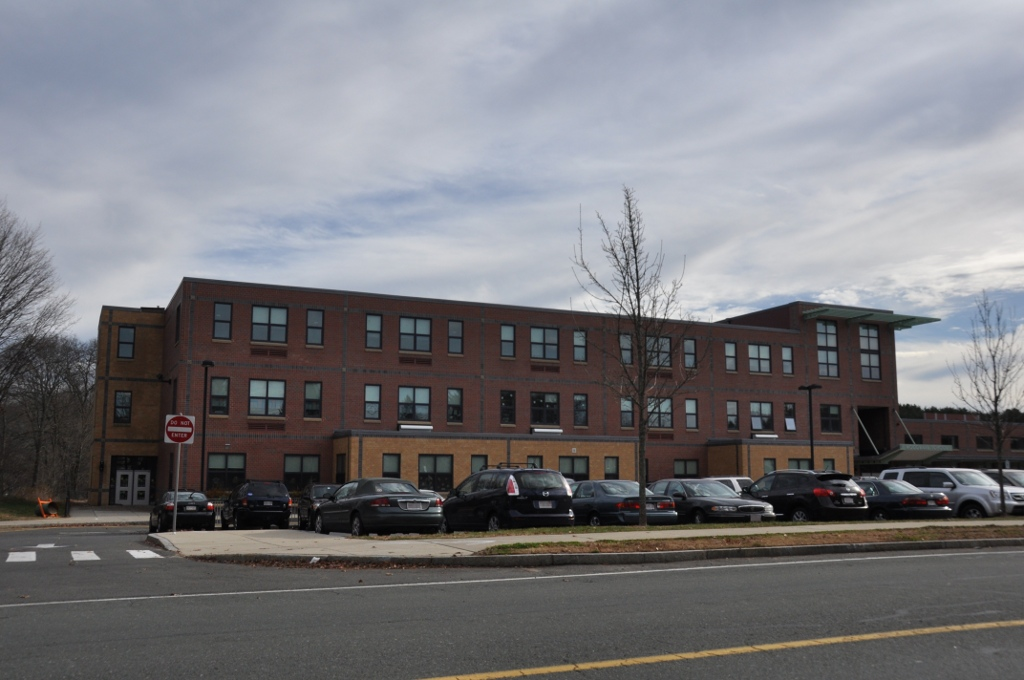
Woodville Elementary School, as seen in November 2011.

Wakefield is home to two high schools: one public school (Wakefield High School), and one regional vocational school (Northeast Vocational). Wakefield contains one middle school, Galvin Middle School, and four elementary schools, Greenwood, Walton, Woodville, and Dolbeare. Doyle School serves as the town's public preschool.

The Little Red School House, also known as the West Ward School, is a former one-room school house building that was last used by kindergarten students on the West Side until the 1990s. It has been preserved and now houses the Wakefield Historical Society.

=== School Committee ===
The Wakefield School Committee oversees Wakefield Public Schools, which is currently headed by superintendent Doug Lyons as of June 2023. Lyons' Assistant Superintendent is Kara Mauro. The School Committee, as of January 2024, is composed of the following elected members: Chairman Amy Leeman (2025), Vice-Chair Stephen Ingalls (2024), Kevin Piskadio (2024), Thomas Markham (2025), Peter Davis (2026), Eileen Colleran (2025), and Kevin Fontanella (2025). The School Committee controls the majority of municipal spending.

== Neighborhoods ==
Wakefield is roughly composed of the following neighborhoods:

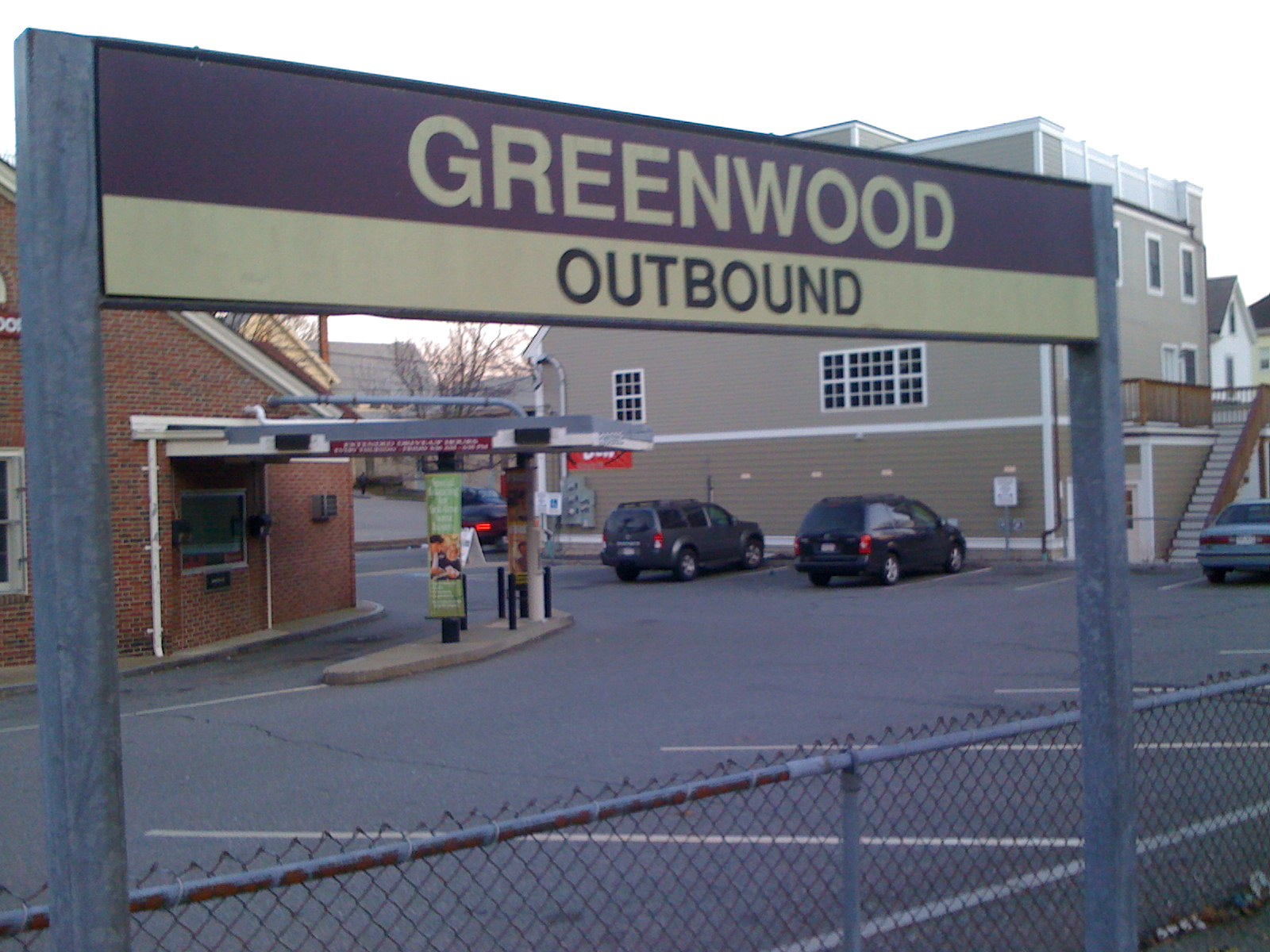
This commuter rail station in Wakefield bears the name of Greenwood, one of its neighborhoods.

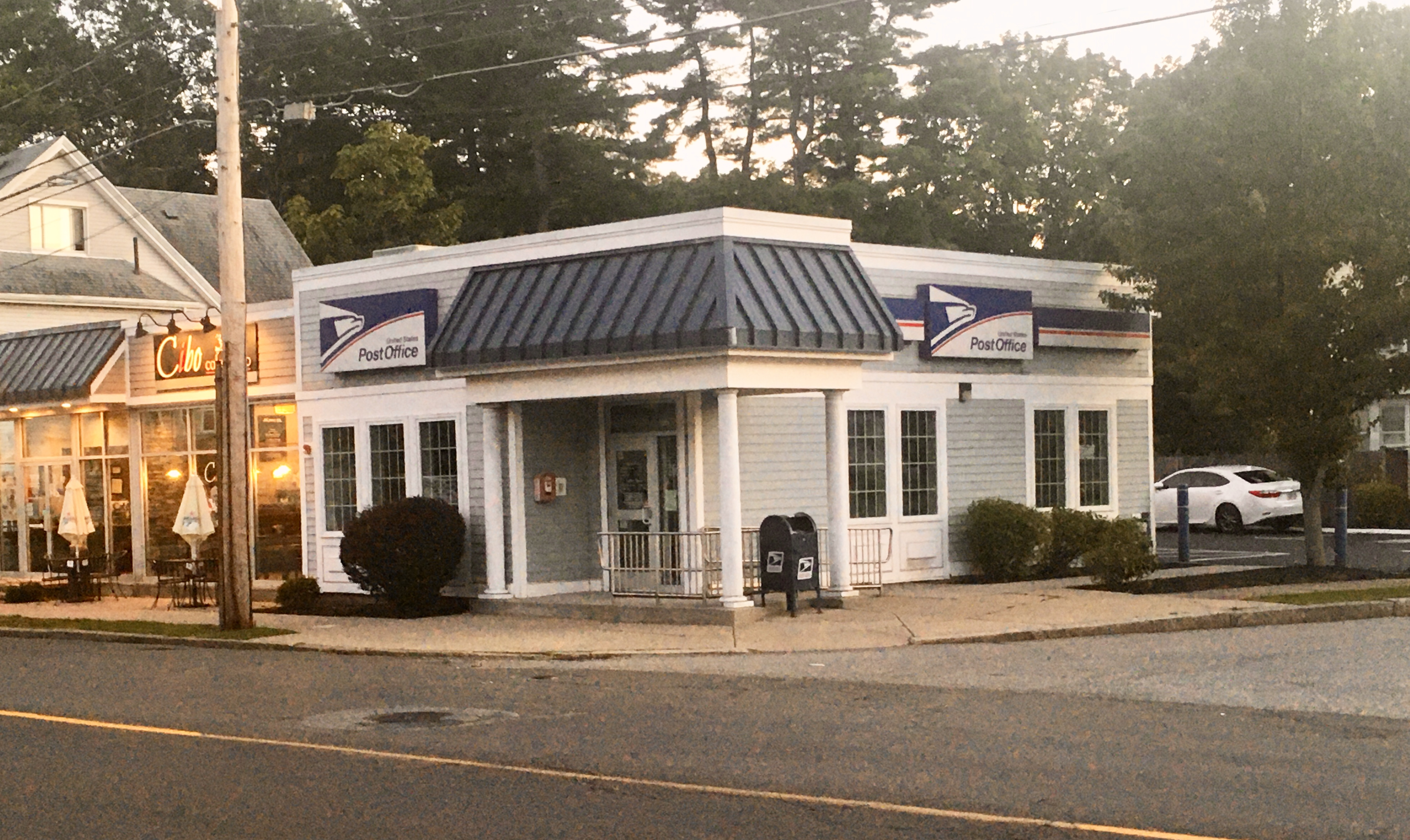
A satellite branch of the Wakefield post office in Greenwood.

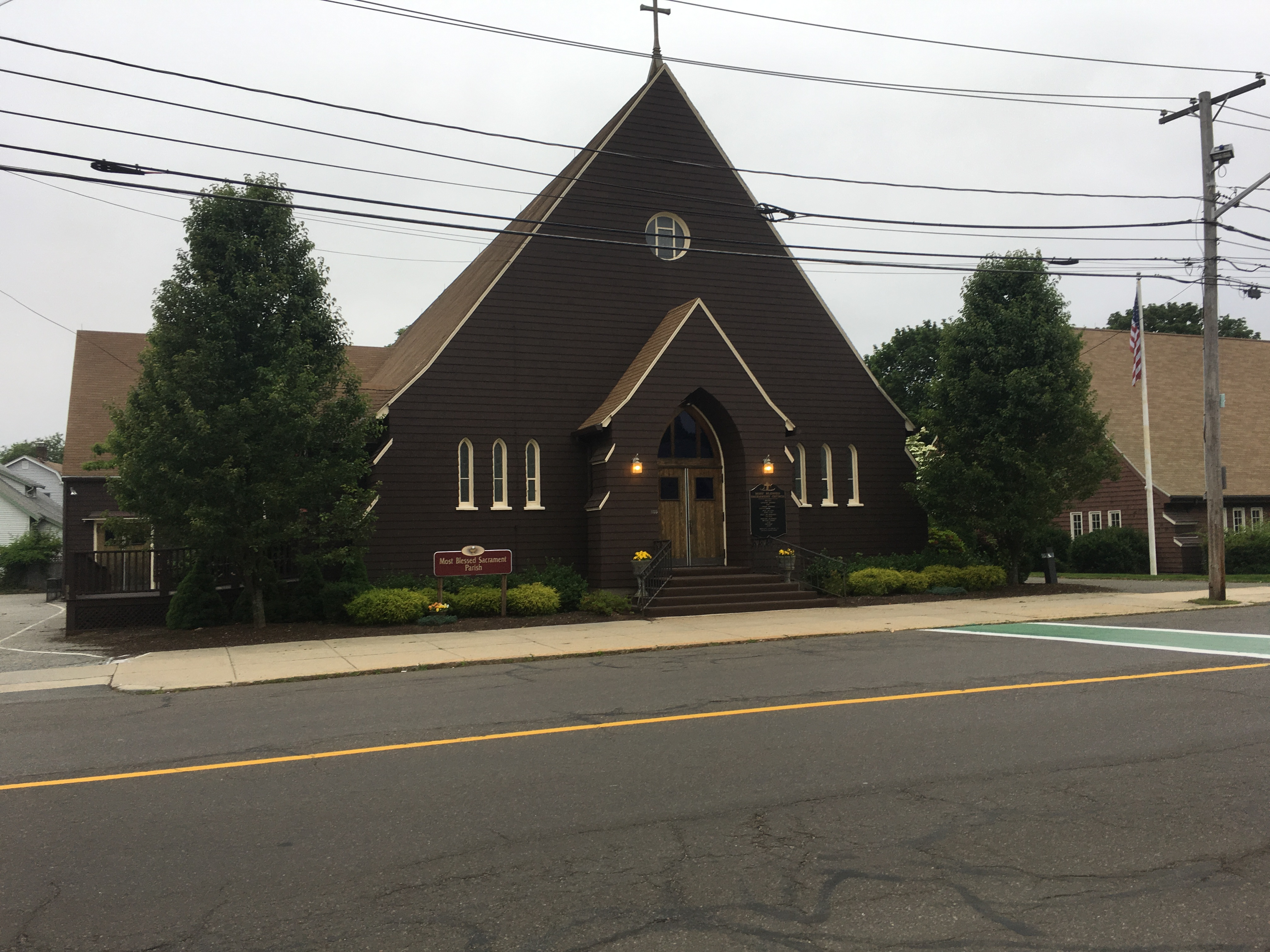
Most Blessed Sacrament Parish, also located in Greenwood, is one of Wakefield's preeminent Catholic places of worship.

- Greenwood consists of nearly all of Southern Wakefield; the Town of Wakefield defines it as land south of the junction of Main Street and Green Street. Greenwood borders the Melrose Highlands neighborhood of Melrose to the south and southwest, the Horace Mann neighborhood of Melrose to the south and southeast, the Golden Hills neighborhood of Saugus to the southeast, and Stoneham to the west. Although a part of Wakefield, Greenwood is often labeled as a town separate from Wakefield on maps and in atlases, and a satellite U.S. Post Office exists on Main Street in southern Greenwood (addresses in Greenwood, however, are labeled under the same zip code as the rest of Wakefield).
- Woodville consists of much of central-eastern Wakefield.
- The Downtown/Wakefield Square area extends from just north of the immediate north shore of Crystal Lake (an area known as Wakefield Junction, where North Avenue merges into Main Street) to the southern shores of Lake Quannapowitt.
- The West Side encompasses nearly all of Wakefield which is west of Lake Quannapowitt and Crystal Lake.
- The East Side, in spite of the name, is not in extreme Eastern Wakefield. Rather, the East Side is about the geographical center of the town, bordering the northeastern shore of Crystal Lake. Woodville is in fact to the east of the "East Side".
- Lakeside encompasses northern-central Wakefield and borders the entire eastern shore of Lake Quannapowitt. Lakeside borders Reading to the north.
- Montrose consists of much of northeastern Wakefield, bordering Lynnfield. Aside from Lake Quannapowitt and Crystal Lake, many of Wakefield's smaller ponds and lakes, such as Heron Pond, can be found in the Montrose region.

== Points of interest ==
- Lake Quannapowitt is a popular recreation area for walkers, joggers, bikers, and rollerbladers.
- Lucius Beebe Memorial Library.
- The town common is the central park of Wakefield, on the southern edge of Lake Quannapowitt. Events such as summer concerts, Fourth of July festivities, Festival by the Lake, and Festival Italia take place there.
- Breakheart Reservation, located in Saugus, is also accessible from Wakefield.
- Wakefield History Museum, located on Prospect Street.

=== Places of worship ===
Wakefield has a wide variety of places of worship serving numerous faiths and denominations. Many townspeople are regular attendees at one of the following:

- First Parish Congregational Church (Downtown/Wakefield Square; adjacent to Wakefield Lower Common)
- Emmanuel Episcopal Church (Downtown/Wakefield Square)
- Most Blessed Sacrament Church (southern Greenwood, on Main Street near the Melrose line)
- Restoration Road Church (formerly Greenwood Union Church) (Greenwood)
- Romanian Orthodox Church (East Side)
- St. Florence Parish (Montrose)
- St. Joseph Parish (West Side)
- Temple Emmanuel (West Side)
- Wakefield–Lynnfield United Methodist Church (Montrose)
- Christ the King North Shore, a branch of the Charismatic Episcopal Church (Wakefield Junction)
- Mun Su Sa Buddhist Temple (Montrose)

==== First Baptist Church fire ====
The First Baptist Church of Wakefield (Downtown/Wakefield Square, constructed 1872) served Wakefield for nearly 150 years before being destroyed by a lightning strike and subsequent fire around 7:10 PM EDT, Tuesday, October 23, 2018. It took the rest of the night for firefighters and first responders to extinguish the blaze. As of October 25, the remains of the church were in a pile waiting cleanup. In the aftermath, First Baptist worship services have continued at the nearby First Parish Congregational Church as well as on the site of the Baptist Church building. Reconstruction of the church began in spring of 2023, with a projected opening in 2024. The newly built First Baptist Church officially opened on September 8, 2024.

The Unitarian Universalist Church of Wakefield closed in June 2024.

== Transportation ==
Wakefield is served by Greenwood station and Wakefield station on the Haverhill Line of the MBTA Commuter Rail system, as well as by MBTA bus route 137. Rt. 128/I-95 runs through Wakefield with exits at Albion Street, North Avenue, Water Street, Vernon Street, New Salem Street, and Salem Street. State Route 129 also passes through Wakefield. US Route 1 runs through nearby Saugus and Lynnfield, while I-93 runs through neighboring Stoneham.

== Media ==
The town is served by two daily newspapers, the locally owned Daily Item, an edition of the Daily Times Chronicle; and a weekly, the Wakefield Observer. The Wakefield Memorial High School has a student-written newspaper called the "WHS exPRESS". The town operates a Public Access cable channel, WCAT Wakefield.

In addition, Wakefield Nation provides election coverage and supports local charitable causes.

== Sports ==
Wakefield has a strong local sports fan base and a robust youth sports culture. Wakefield High School has popular football, baseball, softball, hockey and basketball programs. Wakefield High's football team earned a Division II "Super Bowl" title in 1999, and a Division III "Super Bowl" title in 2022, which followed an undefeated season. Wakefield High's men's and women's basketball teams won Division II state championships in 1997. Baseball is a popular spring and summer sport in the town, with two men's semiprofessional teams: the Wakefield Merchants, a member of Boston's Intercity Baseball League (and champions of that league in 1978 and 1994), and a team representing the local American Legion post.

Wakefield has many active youth sports leagues. Young athletes in Wakefield can choose to play baseball, basketball, lacrosse, football, soccer, hockey, dance, cheerleading, and softball, among other team sports.

== Annual events ==
- Festival By The Lake (2nd Saturday in June)
- Independence Day Parade / Home Town March (Note: The Wakefield Independence Day Parade was not held in 2013 after leaders of the Wakefield Independence Day Committee resigned. Instead, the West Side Social Club staged a considerably smaller event called a "Home Town March" on July 4, 2013. In April 2014, it was announced that the Wakefield Independence Day Committee would endeavor to stage the traditional 4th of July Parade in July 2015, with another "Home Town March" organized by the West Side Social Club to take place for the intervening 4th of July 2014. Ultimately, no Home Town March took place in 2014 due to Hurricane Arthur. A more traditional 4th of July parade organized by a reformed Wakefield Independence Day Committee took place from 2015 to 2019, before being scrapped again in 2020 and 2021, this time due to the COVID-19 pandemic. The Wakefield Independence Day Committee had said it was planning a 2022 return, and the Wakefield Independence Day Parade was again held down North Avenue and Main Street on July 4, 2022, with the Connecticut Hurricanes and Cadets Drum and Bugle Corps serving as the penultimate and ultimate acts. In the years since, the parade has continued its rebound from the pandemic years, with corps such as Les Stentors, 7th Regiment, and marching bands such as The Baltimore Twilighters making appearances. Jessie Diggins, a Wakefield resident, appeared in the parade in 2026.) (July 4)
- Concerts on the Common / Wakefield Summer Band Concert Series (July–September)
- Festival Italia (typically 3rd Saturday in August)
- Wakefield Porchfest (late August or early September) was inaugurated in 2024 as a single-day townwide music festival featuring over one hundred musical acts performing at 50 different locations throughout all neighborhoods of the Town of Wakefield
- Town Day (late September)
- Homecoming Celebration in Autumn
- Tis the Season Holiday Stroll (1st Saturday in December)

== Photo gallery ==
See the top of the page for additional photos.

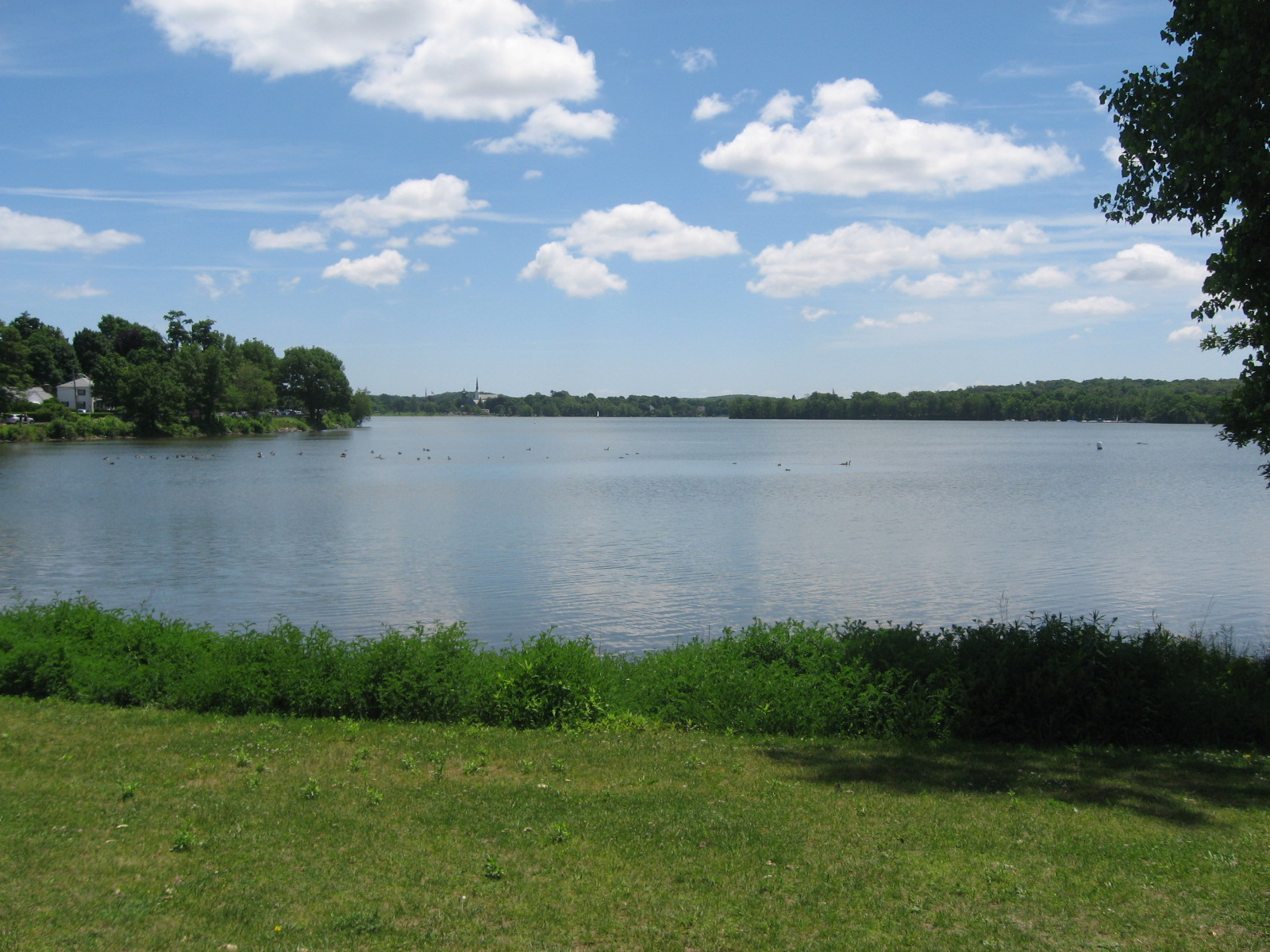
Lake Quannapowitt

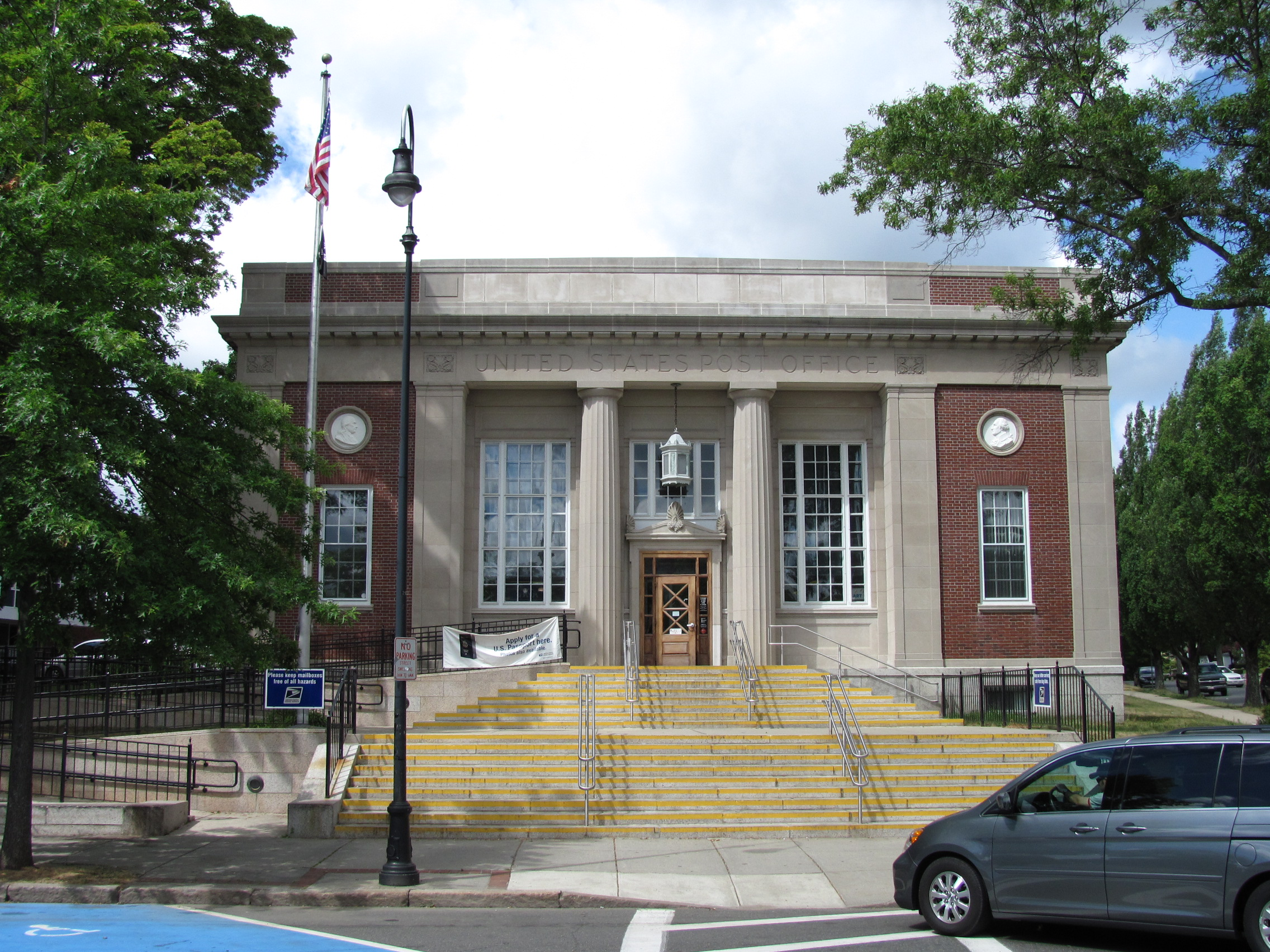
Wakefield Post Office

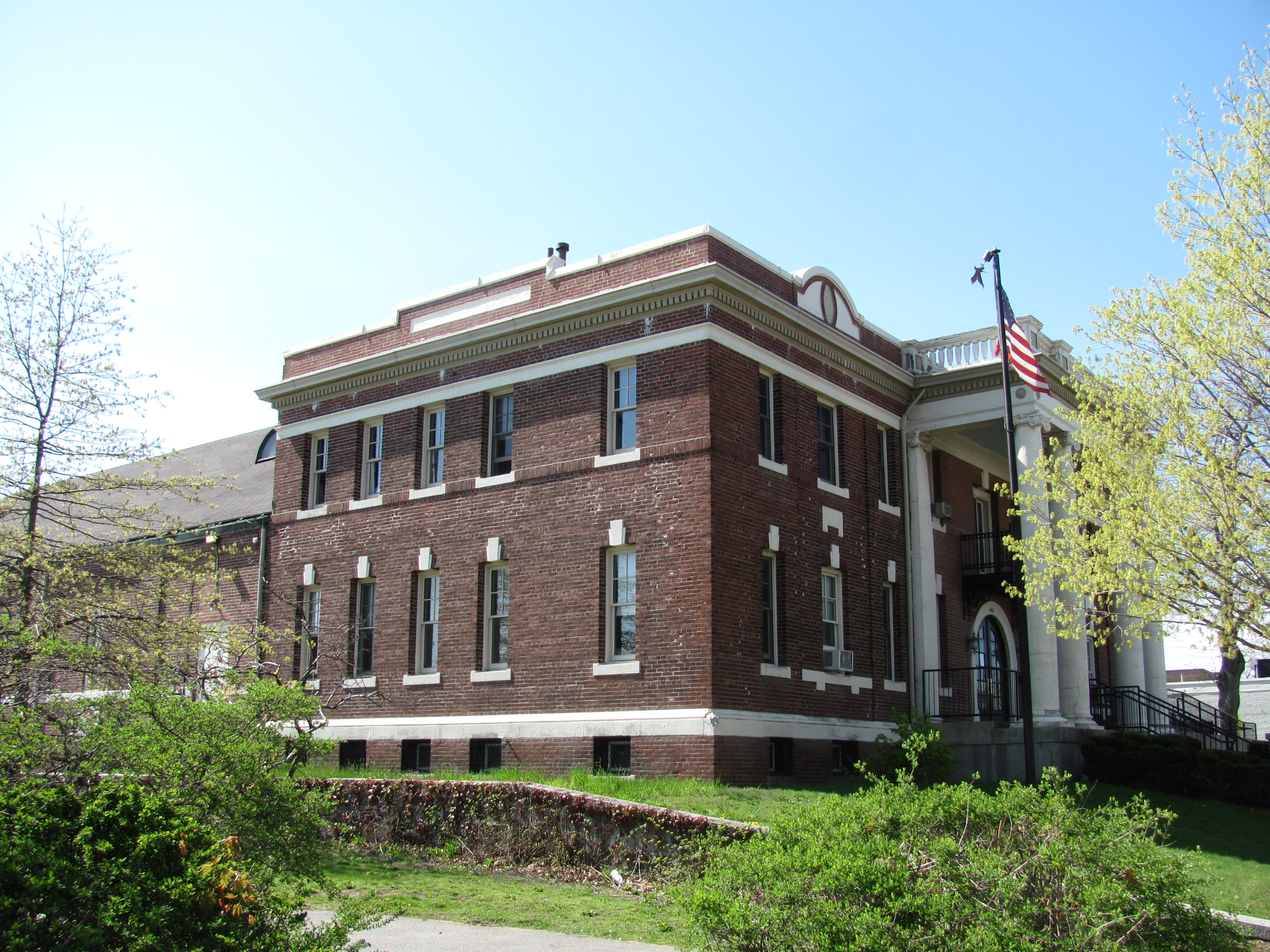
Massachusetts State Armory

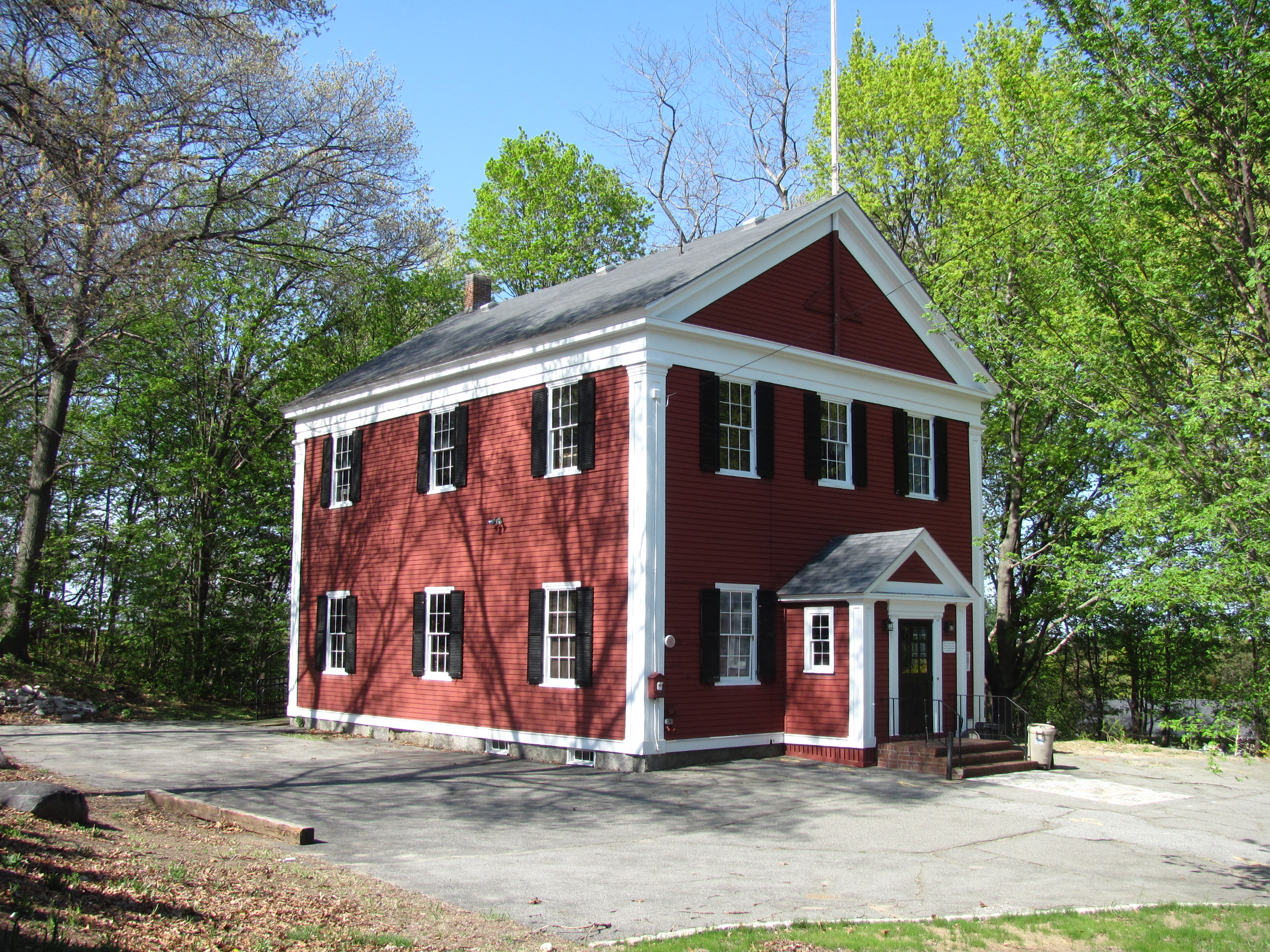
The West Ward School

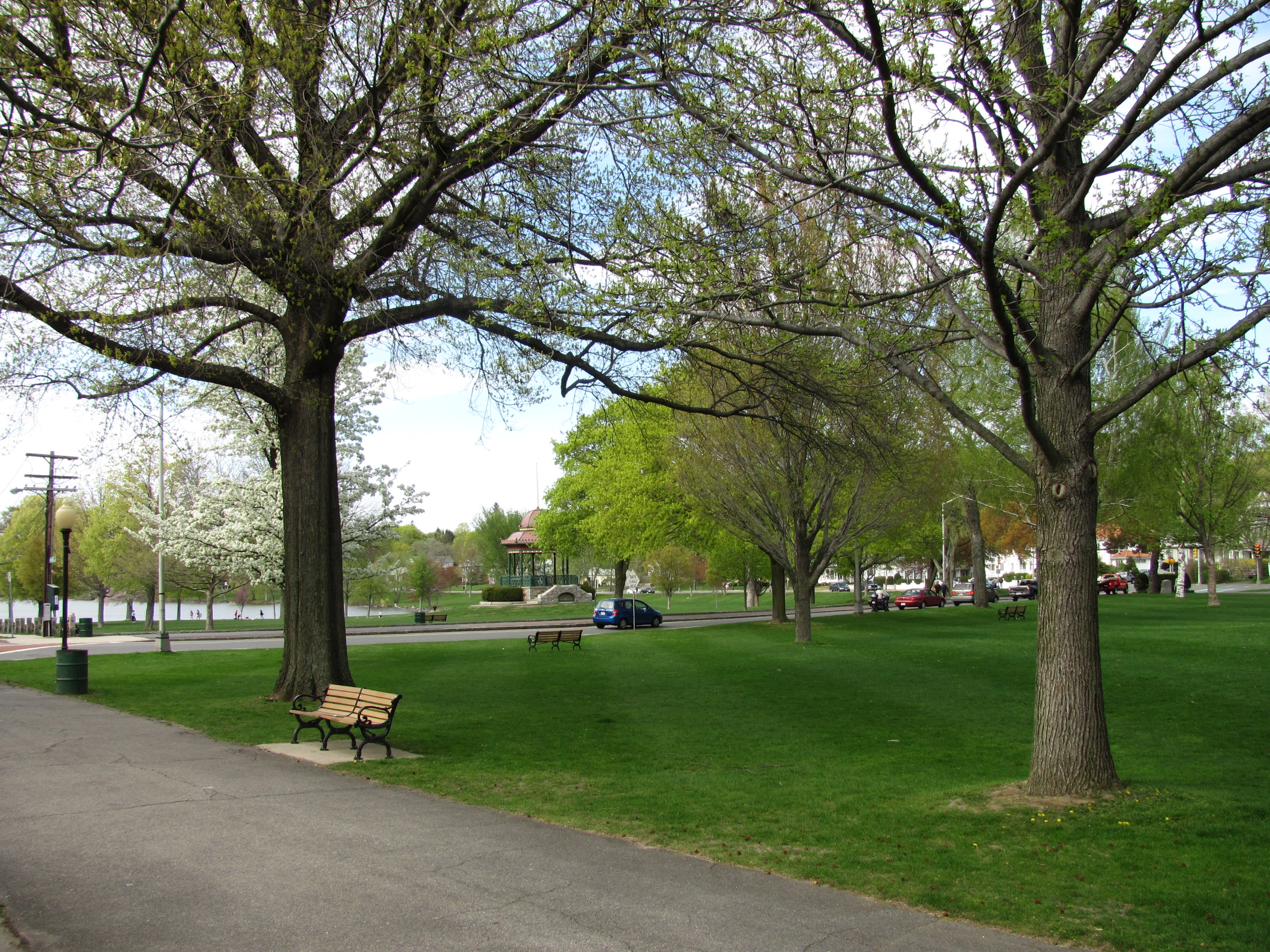
Wakefield's Upper Common

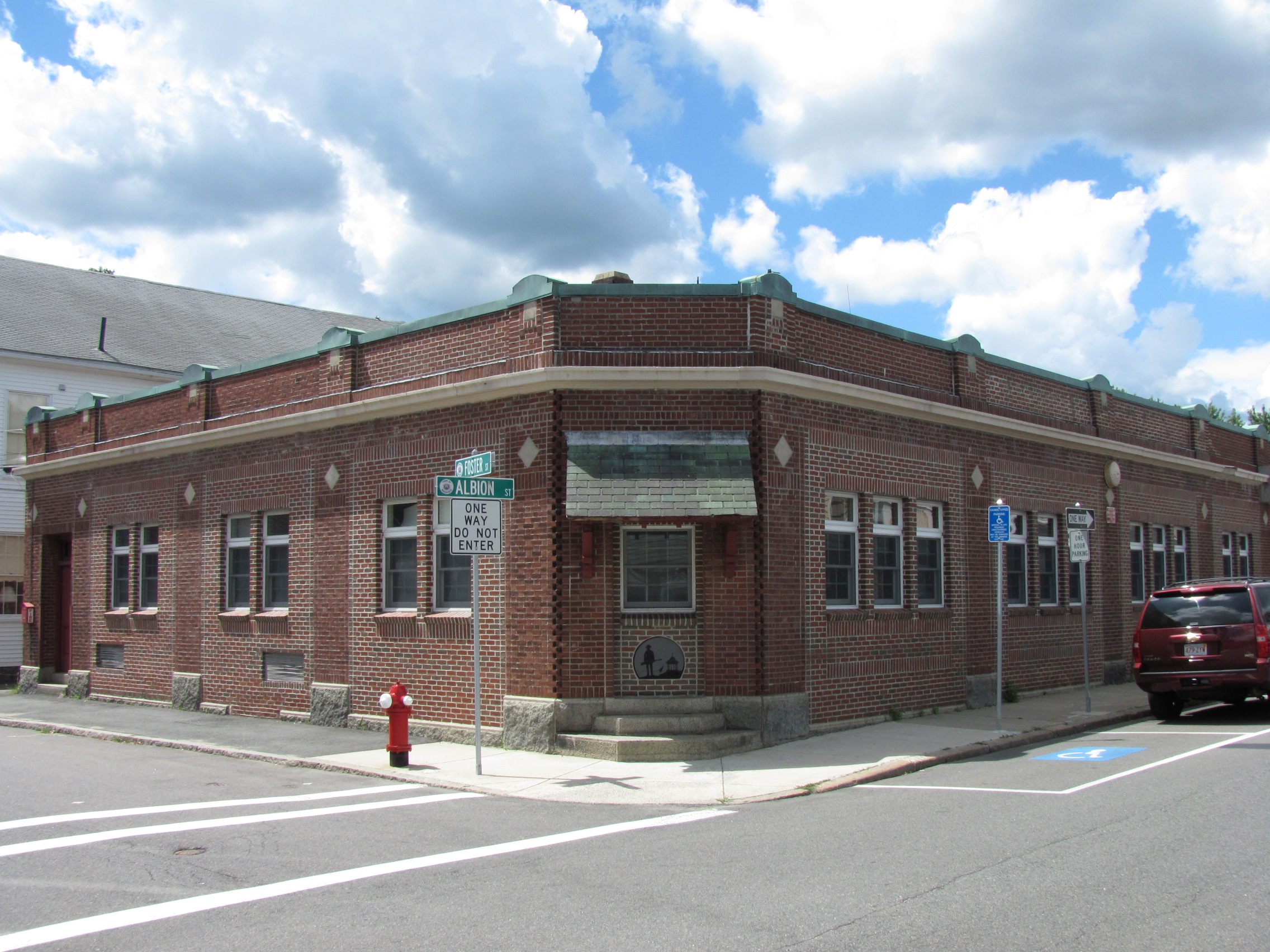
The headquarters of The Wakefield Daily Item

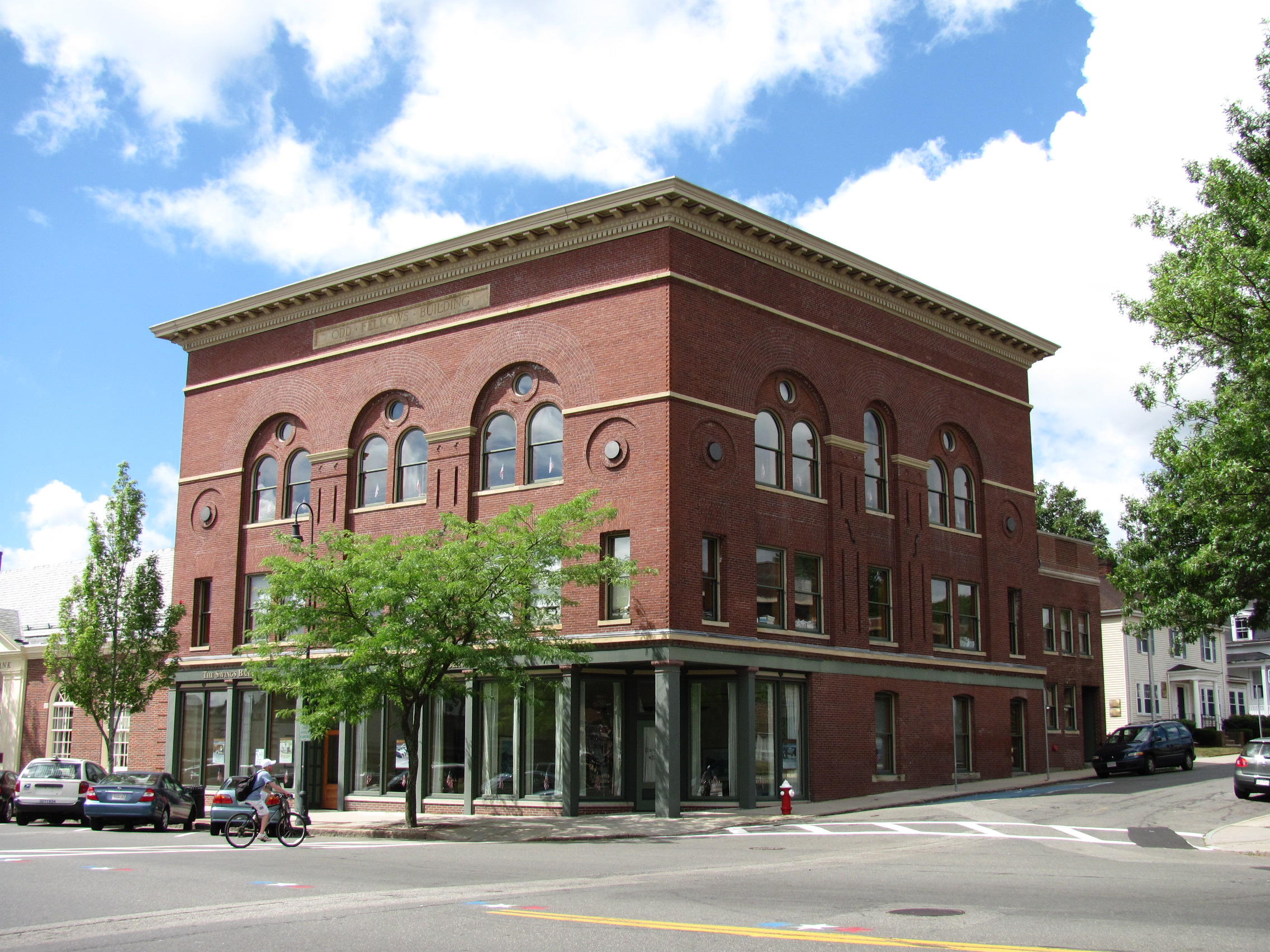
Flanley's Block

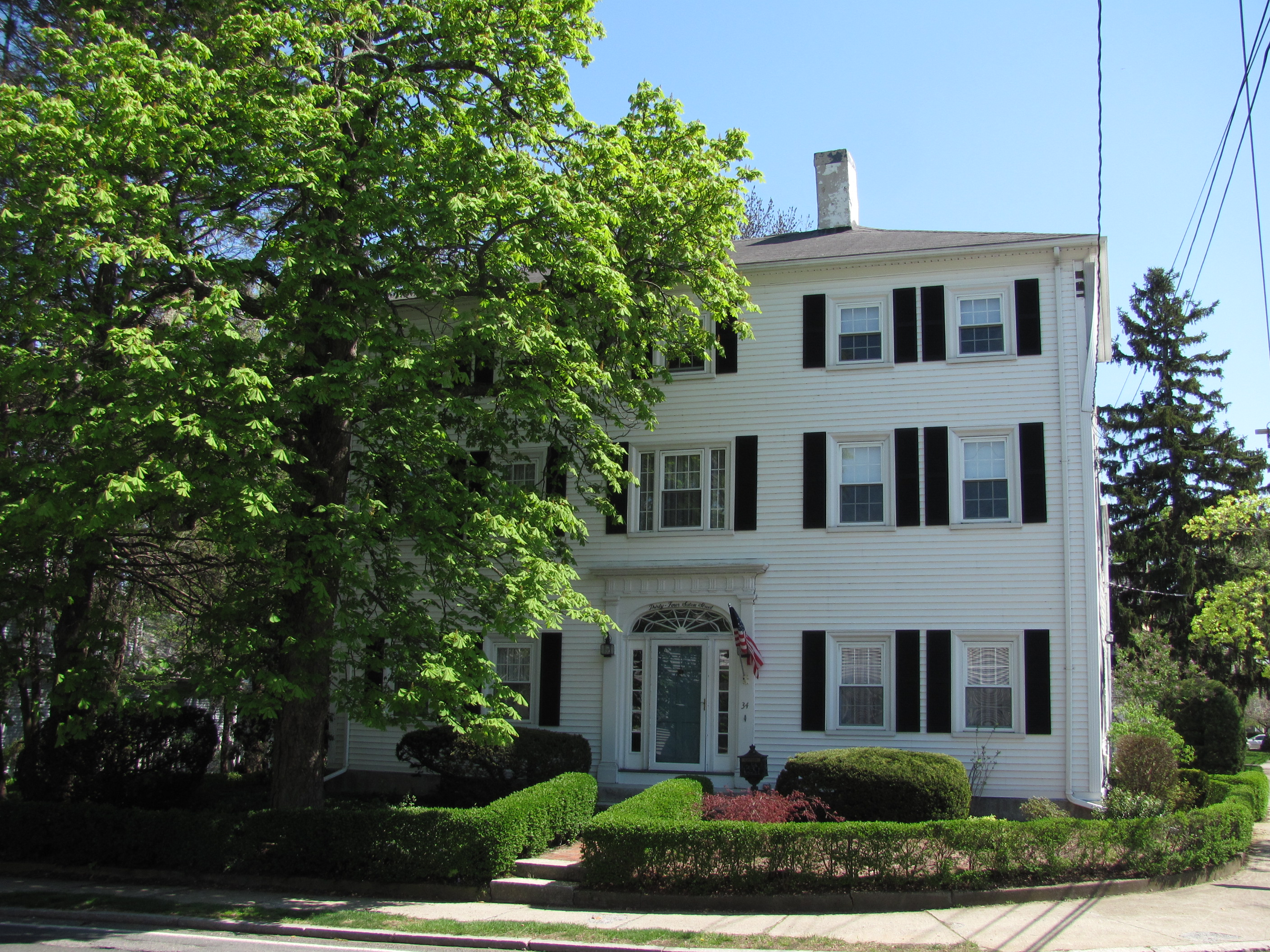
E. Boardman House

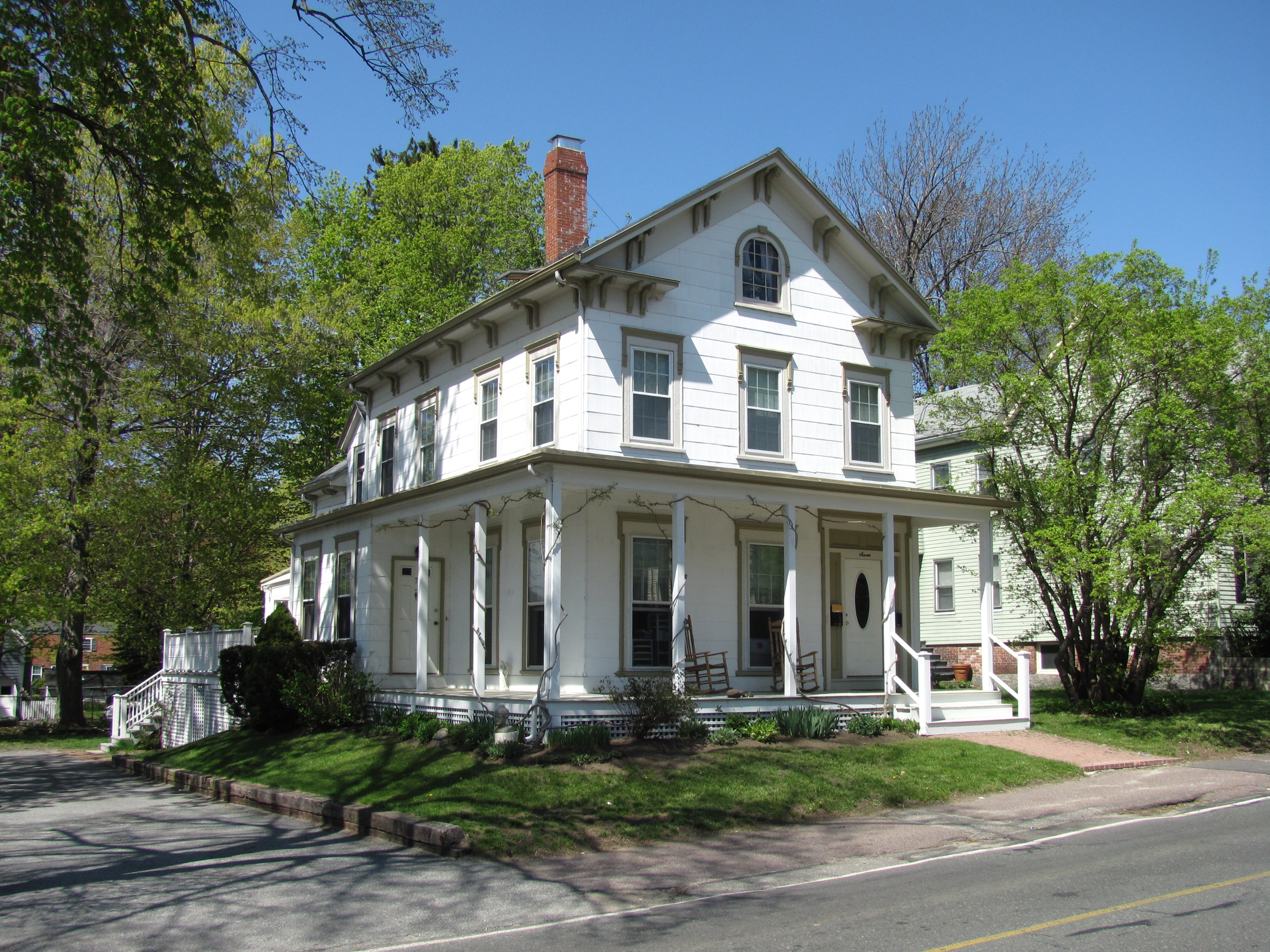
7 Salem Street

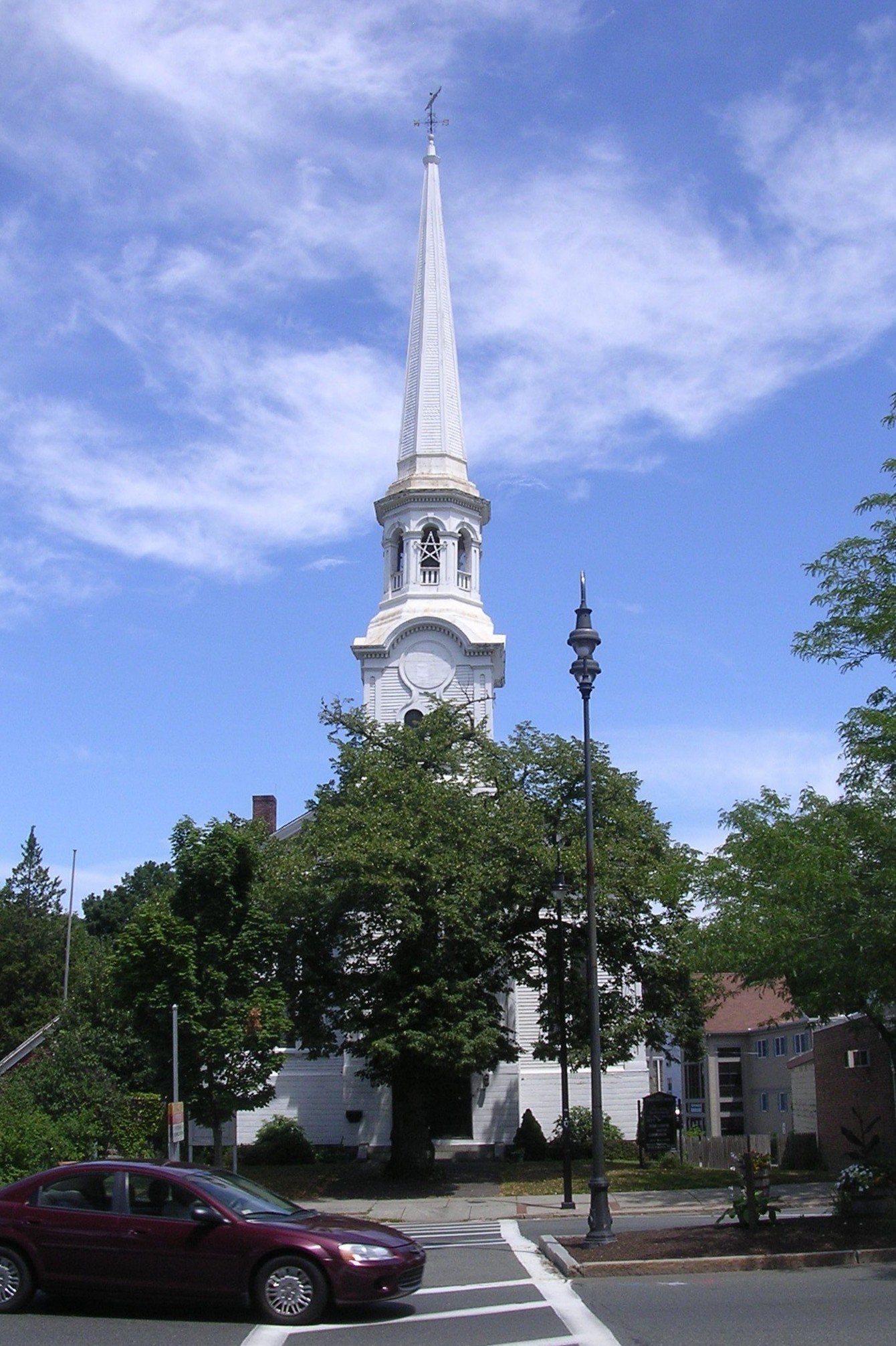
Unitarian Universalist Church of Wakefield

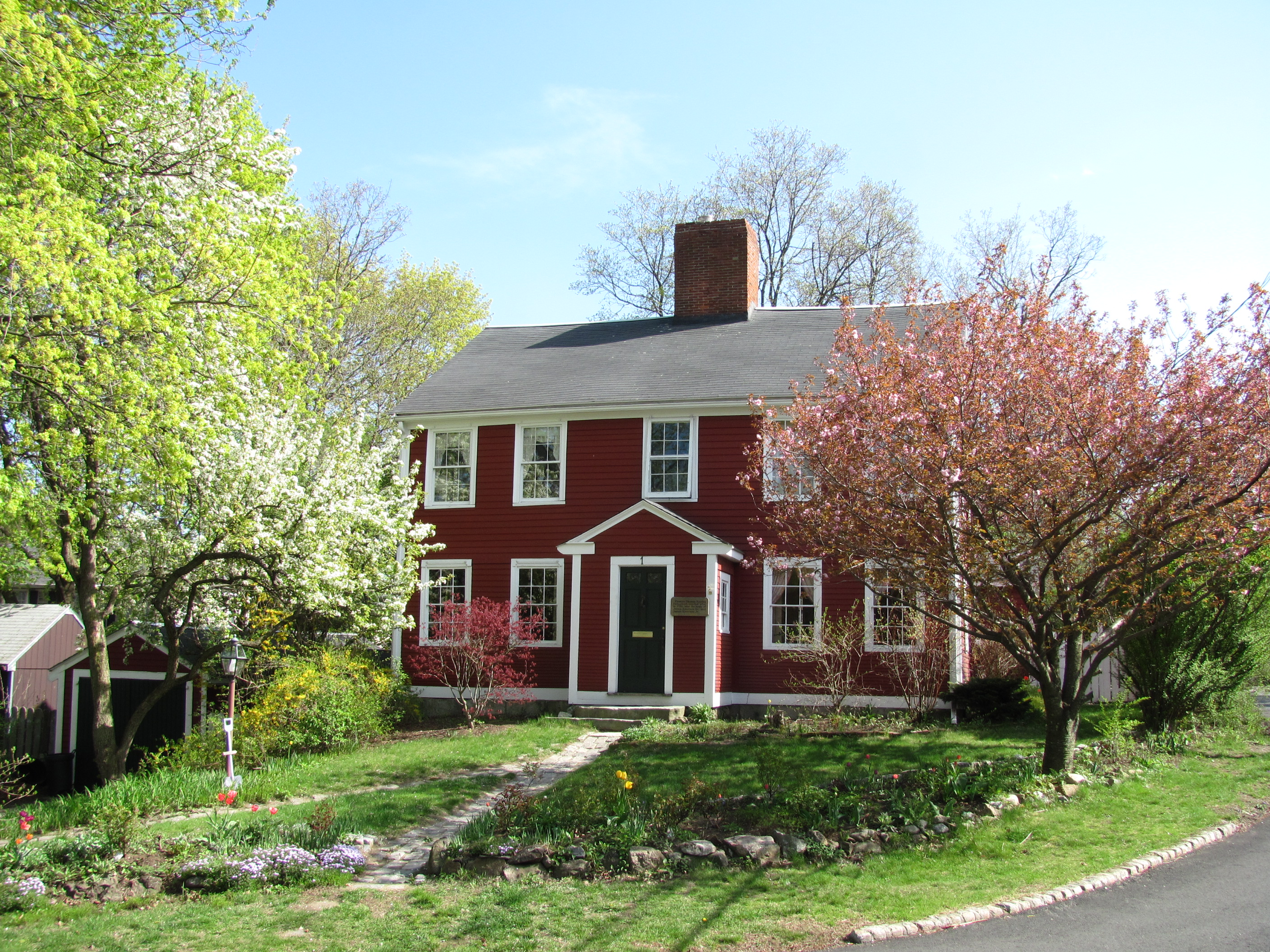
Deacon Thomas Kendall House, One Prospect Street, which dates to the 1600s

== Notable people ==
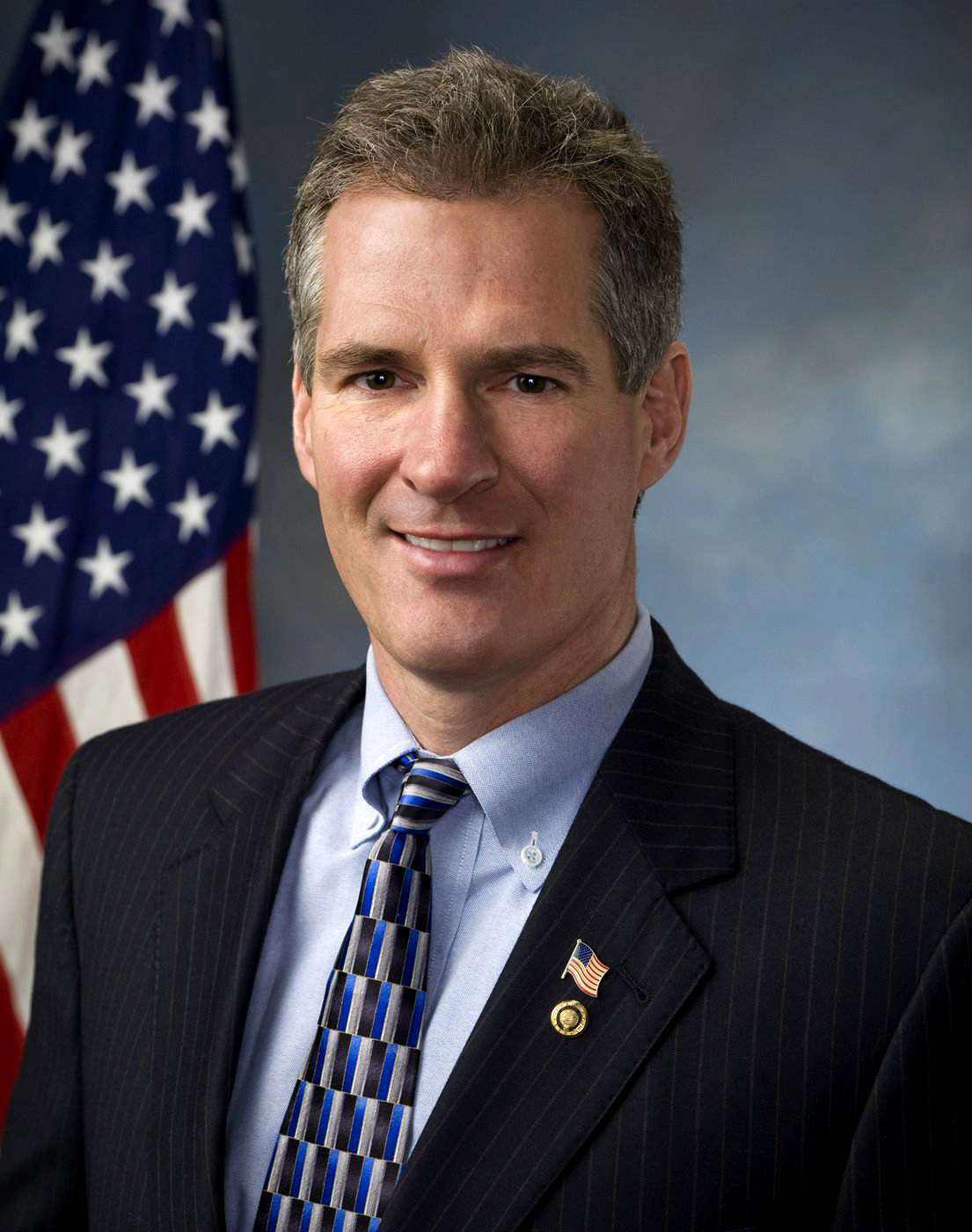
Former U.S. Senator Scott Brown hails from Wakefield.

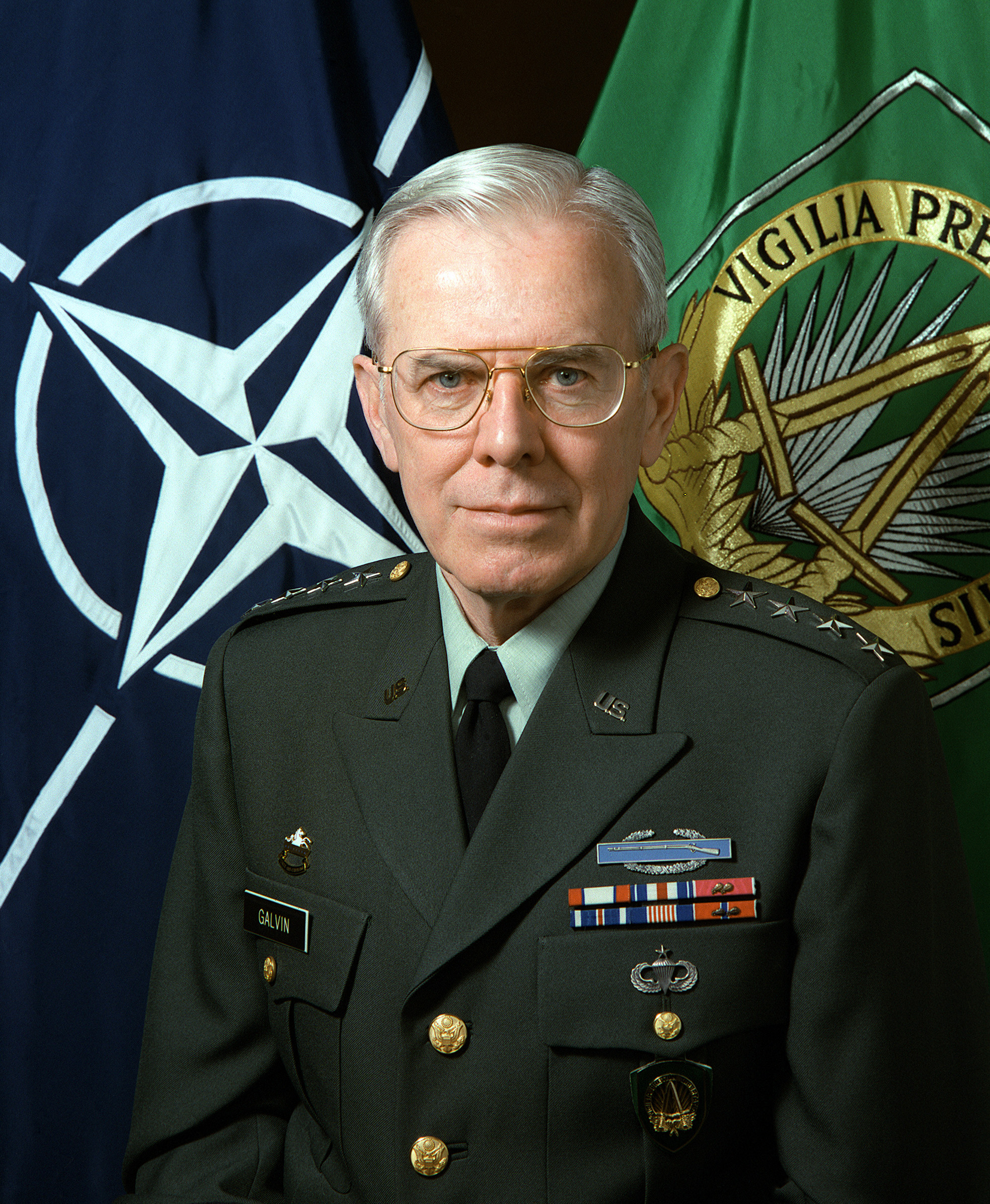
John Galvin was born in Wakefield and is the namesake of Wakefield's Galvin Middle School.

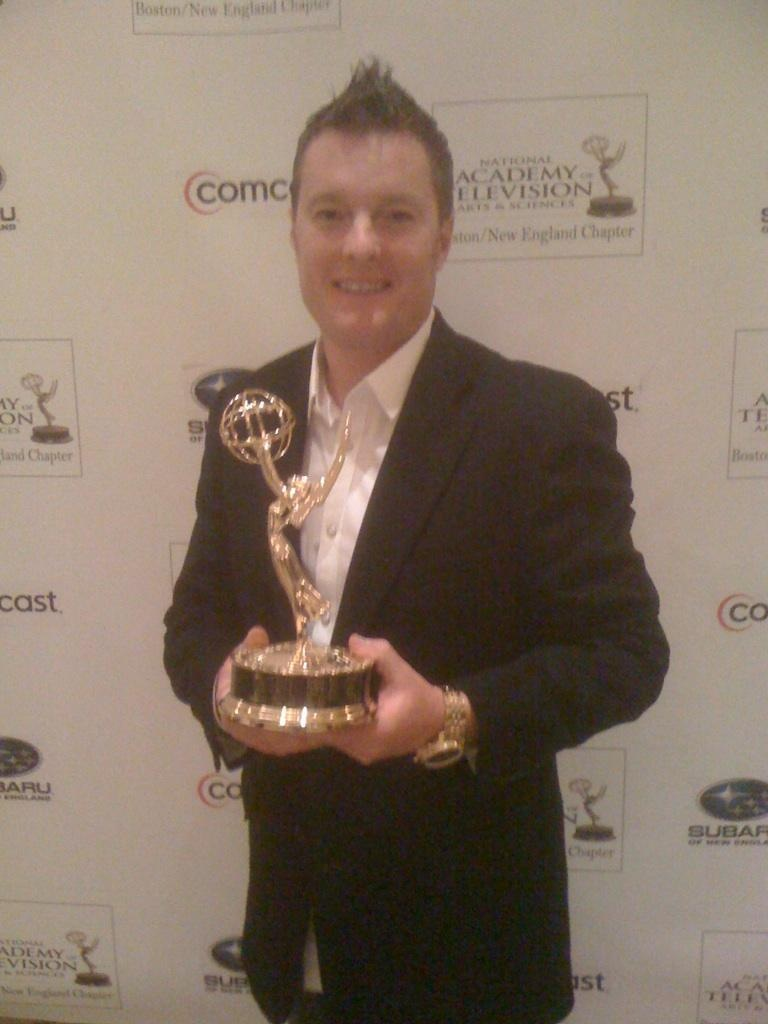
Charlie Moore, Wakefield native and television personality.

- Russell Banks (1940–2023), author, poet, novelist, spent part of his childhood in Wakefield, graduating from Wakefield Memorial High School in 1958.
- Lucius Morris Beebe, author, gourmand, photographer, railroad historian, journalist, and syndicated columnist born December 9, 1902, in Wakefield (died 1966)
- Elizabeth Boit, textile manufacturer

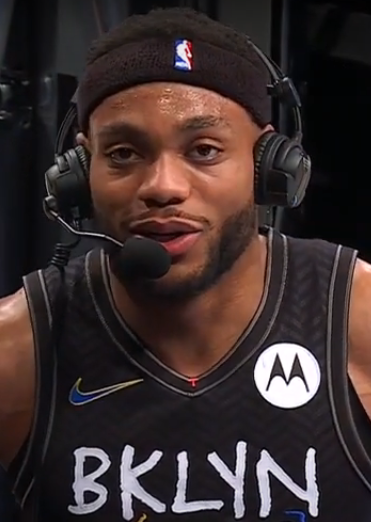
New York Knicks shooting guard Bruce Brown (shown here with Brooklyn) played basketball at Wakefield High School

- William Brewster, ornithologist, born in Wakefield in 1851.
- Bruce Brown, born in Dorchester but moved to Wakefield to attend Wakefield Memorial High School, where he starred in basketball for two seasons.
- Scott Brown, Massachusetts State and US Senator (2010–2013) preceded by Ted Kennedy; defeated in 2012 reelection bid by Elizabeth Warren and in 2014 bid in New Hampshire by Jeanne Shaheen
- Joe Cannata, Merrimack College Warriors goalie and 2009 Vancouver Canucks draftee, has appeared in the American Hockey League and in the Swedish Elite League; currently a member of Löwen Frankfurt of the Deutsche Eishockey Liga.
- Rich Ceisler (1956–2014), stand-up comedian, author and director.
- Carleton S. Coon, anthropologist
- David Dellinger, radical pacifist and member of the Chicago Seven, born in Wakefield and graduated from Wakefield Memorial High School in 1932

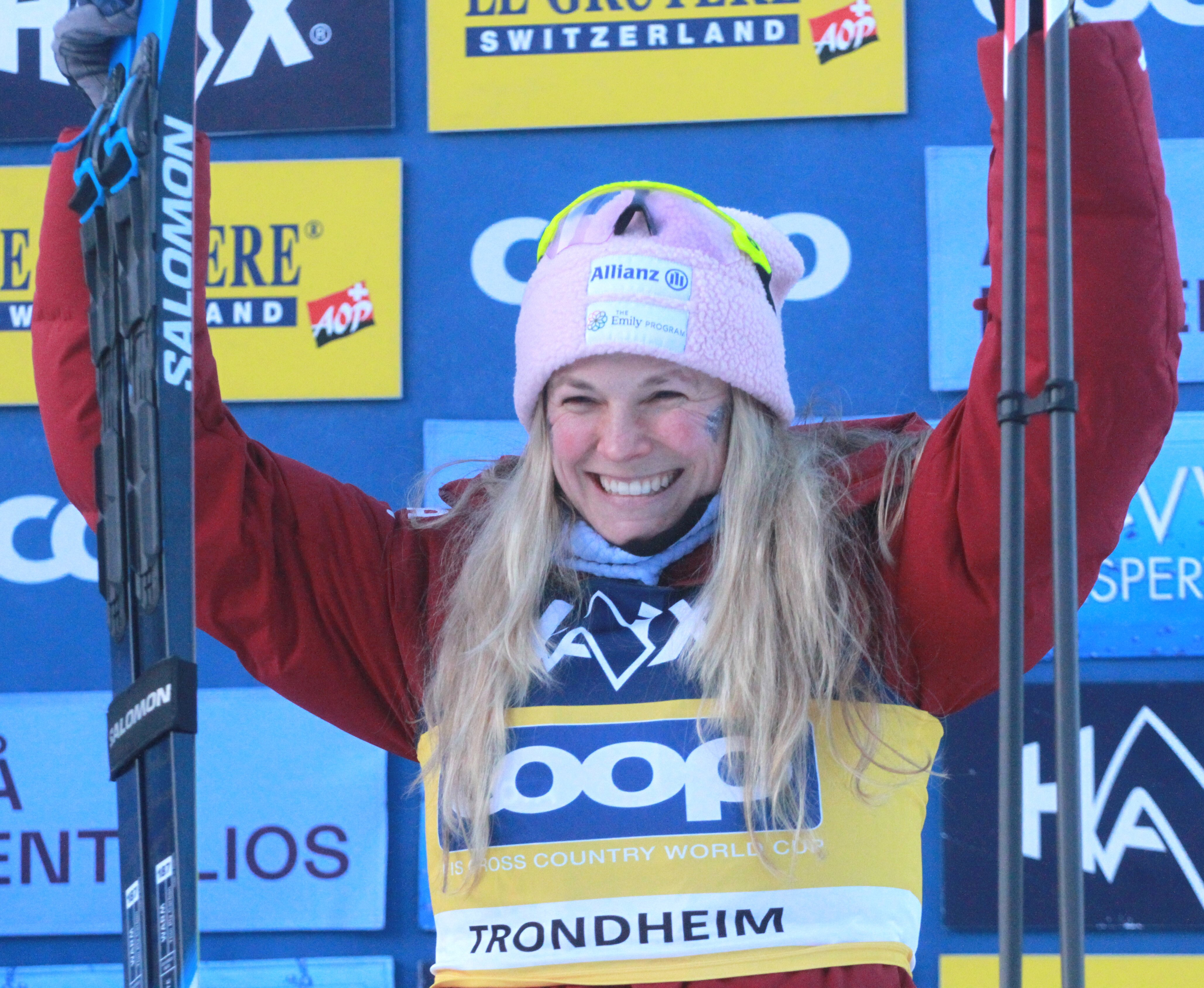
Jessie Diggins, Olympic cross-country skier (seen in 2025), resides in Wakefield

- Jessie Diggins, United States cross-country skier and four-time Olympic medalist, born in Minnesota but resides in Wakefield as of 2025 with her husband, former college and minor league hockey player Wade Poplawski. Diggins appeared in Wakefield's Independence Day Parade in 2026.
- Anthony Fabiano, retired NFL center for the Cleveland Browns; currently a scouting assistant for the same team. Attended Wakefield Memorial High School and Harvard University prior to entering the NFL
- Shannon Fairweather, contestant on the 49th season of Survivor
- Ernie Gahan (1926–2009), stock car racing driver
- John Galvin, US Army general and former NATO Supreme Allied Commander
- Kayla Harrison, judoka, two-time Olympic gold medalist (2012 and 2016) and world champion in judo. Kayla was the first American (man or woman) to win an Olympic medal in the sport.
- Magnus Colcord Heurlin, Swedish-American artist, born in Sweden, raised in Wakefield
- Israel Horovitz, playwright and screenwriter born March 31, 1939, in Wakefield. His oeuvre includes several plays about Wakefield, collected in a book known as The Wakefield Plays. Horovitz died on November 9, 2020, at the age of 81. Beastie Boy Adam "Ad-Rock" Horovitz is the son of Israel Horovitz
- Mark Kumpel, member of the 1984 US Olympic ice hockey team and former NHL player with the Winnipeg Jets, Quebec Nordiques, and the Detroit Red Wings

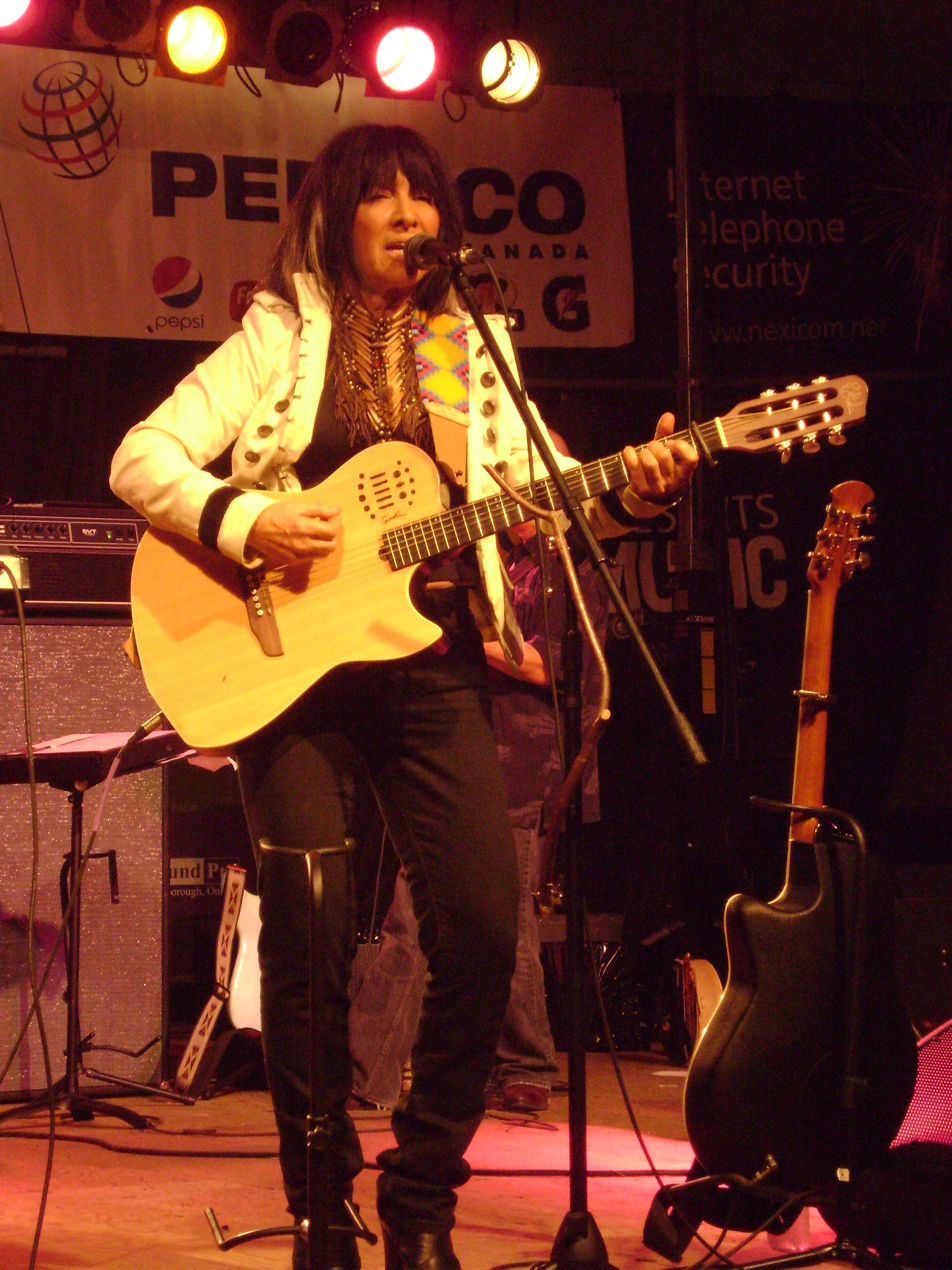
Buffy Sainte Marie spent part of her childhood in Wakefield.

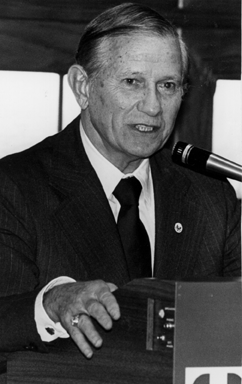
John Anthony Volpe was born in and lived in Wakefield.

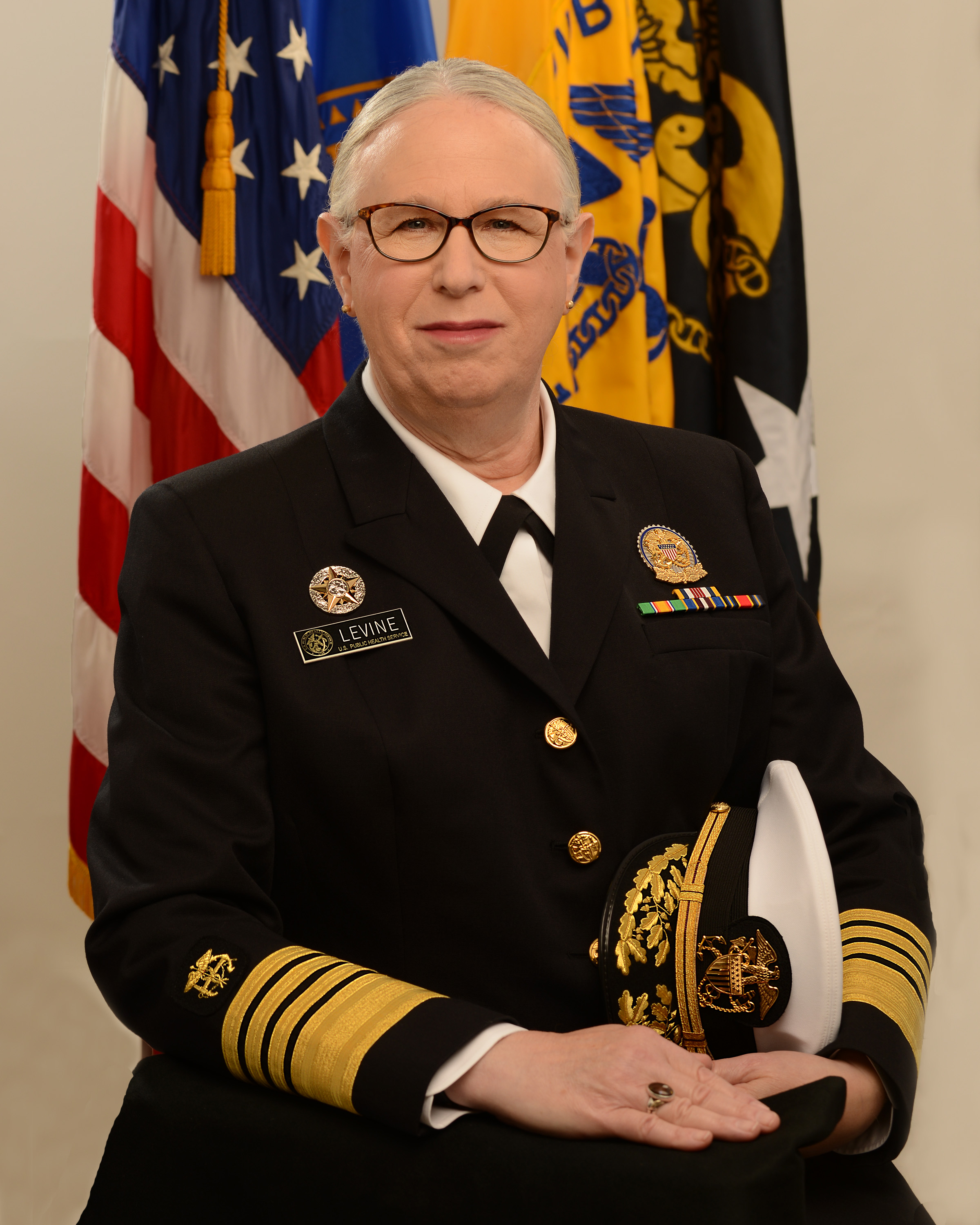
Rachel Levine, former United States Assistant Secretary for Health, grew up in Wakefield.

- Dave Lapham, former NFL player with the Cincinnati Bengals, former USFL player with the New Jersey Generals, current member of the Cincinnati Bengal radio broadcast team
- Rachel Levine, pediatrician who served as Secretary of the Pennsylvania Department of Health from 2017 to 2021, and who was Assistant Secretary for Health in the Biden administration. Levine is the first openly transgender four-star officer in the nation's eight uniformed services
- John Lilley, member of the 1994 US Olympic ice hockey team and former NHL player with the Mighty Ducks of Anaheim
- Buffy (Beverly) Sainte Marie, folksinger and composer, born and raised in Wakefield, graduating from Wakefield Memorial High School in 1958
- James Massone, former contestant on season 2 of the NBC program The Voice
- A. David Mazzone, Judge for the U.S. District Court in Boston from 1978 until 2004. He is best known for the 1985 court decision mandating the cleanup of Boston Harbor, which ultimately cost $3.8 billion and resulted in the construction of the Deer Island wastewater treatment plant. Mazzone lived in Wakefield from 1959 until his death in 2004
- Charlie Moore, host of NESN's Charlie Moore Outdoors
- Marcia Pankratz, member of the 1988 and 1996 Olympic field hockey team and former head coach of field hockey at the University of Michigan
- Jimmy Pedro, multiple Olympic medalist in judo and former world champion
- Charles Lenox Remond, activist and abolitionist, lived in Wakefield
- C. F. Russell (1897–1987), American occultist and writer associated with Aleister Crowley
- Louis Sullivan, architect considered the father of modernism, born in Boston but lived in Wakefield with his grandparents during his school years
- Richard Tisei, former Massachusetts State Senate Minority Leader and former candidate for Lt. Governor
- Ernest Tyzzer (1875–1965), pathologist
- John Volpe, three-time Republican governor of Massachusetts, U.S. Secretary of Transportation, and Ambassador to Italy; born in Wakefield in 1908
- Charles R. Wait (1880–1973), architect
- Burrage Yale (1781–1860), tin ware manufacturer, largest employer of Wakefield during the early 19th century
