= The Pathfinder: Buried Treasures – The Mid-70's Recordings =

Compilation album by Buffy Sainte-Marie
- Released: 2010
- Recorded: 1973–1975
- Studios: Quad Studios (Nashville, Tennessee); A&M (Hollywood, California)
- Genres: Folk, rock, art pop
- Label: Gypsy Boy Music
- Producers: Norbert Putnam, Buffy Sainte-Marie and Henry Lewy (original recordings)

Buffy Sainte-Marie chronology
Running for the Drum (2008)	The Pathfinder: Buried Treasures – The Mid-70's Recordings (2010)	Power in the Blood (2015)

The Pathfinder: Buried Treasures – The Mid-70's Recordings is a 2010 compilation album composed of the three studio albums recorded by Buffy Sainte-Marie during her time with MCA Records and ABC Records.

Covering the years between 1974 and 1976, the material includes all tracks from Buffy (1974), Changing Woman (1975) and Sweet America (1976) but is not presented in the chronological order of those album's initial release. The compilation is a reissue of the 2008 Big Beat 2 CD set Buffy/Changing Woman/Sweet America: The Mid-70's Records which used similar artwork (a photo of originally used on the rear cover of Sweet America) and had the songs sequenced in their original album order.

The Pathfinder received a positive review from The Province, which gave it an A rating, stating that the set "...captures the period when Sainte-Marie both cemented her reputation as an arresting performer of utterly unique style as well as a protest singer of exceptional power."

== Track listing ==
Disc 1
No.	Title	Originally released on	Length
1.	"Generation"	Buffy
2.	"Sweet Little Vera"	Buffy
3.	"Hong Kong Star Boy"	Buffy as "Star Boy"
4.	"Look At The Facts"	Sweet America
5.	"Sweet, Fast Hooker Blues"	Buffy
6.	"Nobody Will Ever Know It’s Real But You"	Changing Woman
7.	"Eagle Man / Changing Woman"	Changing Woman
8.	"You Take Me Away"	Changing Woman
9.	"Starwalker"	Sweet America
10.	"All Around The World"	Changing Woman
11.	"I’ve Really Fallen For You"	Buffy
12.	"Love’s Got To Breathe And Fly"	Changing Woman
13.	"A Man"	Changing Woman
14.	"I Can’t Take It No More"	Buffy
15.	"Sweet January"	Sweet America
16.	"Can’t You See The Way I Love You"	Changing Woman
17.	"Qu’Appelle Valley, Saskatchewan"	Sweet America
18.	"Mongrel Pup"	Changing Woman
Total length:			...

Disc 2
No.	Title	Originally released on	Length
1.	"I Been Down"	Sweet America
2.	"The Beauty Way"	Changing Woman
3.	"Where Poets Go"	Sweet America
4.	"That’s The Way You Fall In Love"	Buffy
5.	"Hey! Baby Howdja Do Me This Way"	Buffy
6.	"I Don’t Need No City Life"	Sweet America
7.	"Wynken, Blynken And Nod"	Sweet America
8.	"Can’t Believe The Feeling"	Buffy as "Can't Believe The Feeling When You're Gone"
9.	"Free The Lady"	Sweet America
10.	"Sweet America"	Sweet America
11.	"Honey Can You Hang Around"	Sweet America
12.	"Waves"	Buffy
13.	"America My Home"	Sweet America
14.	"Ain’t No Time For Worrying Blues"	Sweet America
15.	"'Til I See You Again"	Changing Woman
Total length:			...
