= The Circle & the Square =

Studio album by Red Box
- Released: 1986
- Genres: Pop; new wave
- Length: 47:13
- Label: WEA
- Producers: David Motion; David Motion and Chris Hughes

Red Box chronology
The Circle & the Square (1986)	Motive (1990)

Professional ratings
Review scores
Source	Rating
AllMusic	4.5/5 stars
Trouser Press	(Positive)

The Circle & the Square is the debut album by British pop group Red Box, released in 1986. The album contains the group's two UK top ten hit singles, "Lean on Me", which reached number three, and "For America", which reached number 10. Three other singles are included on the album: the band's debut "Chenko (Tenka-Io)", which originally failed to chart in 1984 but reached number 77 when re-issued in 1987, "Saskatchewan", which also failed to chart in 1984, and "Heart of the Sun" which reached number 71 in 1987.

== Track listing ==
All tracks written by Simon Toulson-Clarke, except where noted.

=== WEA LP: WX79 (Gatefold sleeve: WX79T) ===
Round side
No.	Title	Writer(s)	Length
1.	"For America"		3:46
2.	"Heart of the Sun"	Simon Toulson-Clarke; Julian Close	4:07
3.	"Billy's Line"		4:49
4.	"Bantu"		4:22
5.	"Living in Domes"		5:39
6.	"Lean on Me Reprise"		1:17
Total length:			23:59

Square side
No.	Title	Writer(s)	Length
1.	"Chenko (Tenka-Io)"		4:31
2.	"Lean on Me (Ah-Li-Ayo)"		4:25
3.	"Saskatchewan"	Buffy Sainte-Marie	3:56
4.	"Leaders in Seventh Heaven"	Toulson-Clarke; Close	5:05
5.	"Walk Walk"	Toulson-Clarke; Close	4:40
6.	"Amen"	unknown	0:38
Total length:			23:14

=== WEA CD: WX79CD ===
No.	Title	Writer(s)	Length
1.	"For America"		3:46
2.	"Heart of the Sun"	Toulson-Clarke; Close	4:07
3.	"Billy's Line"		4:49
4.	"Bantu"		4:22
5.	"Living in Domes"		5:39
6.	"Lean on Me Reprise"		1:17
7.	"Chenko (Tenka-Io)"		4:31
8.	"Lean on Me (Ah-Li-Ayo)"		4:25
9.	"Saskatchewan"	Sainte-Marie	3:56
10.	"Leaders in Seventh Heaven"	Toulson-Clarke; Close	5:05
11.	"Walk Walk"	Toulson-Clarke; Close	4:40
12.	"Amen"	unknown	0:38
Total length:			47:13

=== 2008 Cherry Pop CD: CR POP 9 ===
No.	Title	Writer(s)	Length
1.	"For America"		3:46
2.	"Heart of the Sun"	Toulson-Clarke; Close	4:08
3.	"Billy's Line"		4:49
4.	"Bantu"		4:22
5.	"Living in Domes"		5:38
6.	"Lean on Me Reprise"		1:17
7.	"Chenko (Tenka-Io)"		4:30
8.	"Lean on Me (Ah-Li-Ayo)"		4:26
9.	"Saskatchewan"	Sainte-Marie	3:55
10.	"Leaders in Seventh Heaven"	Toulson-Clarke; Close	5:06
11.	"Walk Walk"	Toulson-Clarke; Close	4:40
12.	"Amen"	unknown	0:40
13.	"R 'n' A"	Toulson-Clarke; Close	4:03
14.	"Stinging Bee"	Toulson-Clarke; Close	4:39
15.	"Enjoy (Solid Gold Easy Amex)"	Toulson-Clarke; Close	4:33
16.	"Speeches"	Toulson-Clarke; Close; Phill Brown	4:47
17.	"Chenko (Tenka-Io)"		3:31
18.	"Valley"	Toulson-Clarke; Close	5:01
Total length:			73:51

== Personnel ==
=== Musicians ===
- Simon Toulson-Clarke – lead vocals, acoustic guitar
- Julian Close – programming, saxophone, flute
- Chris Wyles – drums, percussion
- Simon Edwards – bass guitar
- Ginny Clee – additional vocals
- Martin Noakes – piano
- Neil Taylor – electric guitar
- Alison Lea – marimba, vibraphone, tuned percussion
- David Motion, Alan Park, Gavin Povey, Gary Hutchins – keyboards
- Viktor Sebek – accordion
- Bruce Nockles – trumpet
- Philip Eastop – French horn
- Helen Tunstall – harp
- Alexander Balanescu, Bobby Valentino – violin
- Matthew Cang – echo and tremolo guitar
- Ginny Clee, Lucy Clee, Simon Edwards, Kris Gould, Tony Head, Mark Hoye, Ian Hunt, Gary Hutchins, Leroy James, Suzanna Lindsey, Ian MacKinnon, Martin Noakes, Anna Pavlou, Paddy Talbot, Sue Thomas, Jennie Tsao, Ian Whitmore – Box vox

=== Production ===
- "Leaders in Seventh Heaven" brass arrangement by Andrew Poppy
- "Billy's Line" keyboard arrangement by Paddy Talbot
- Produced by David Motion
- Engineered by Trigger
- "Lean on Me" produced by David Motion and Chris Hughes
- Additional engineering by David Bascombe, Chris Baylis, Phil Harding, Steve Jackson
- Assistants: Anna Pavlou, Mark Boyne, Paul Townrow, Irene Hogan, Matt Howe, Mike Bigwood, JB Lierre, Seb Gore, Mike Dignam
- Recorded at Eden, Air, Jam, Tapestry, Strongroom, Woolhall, Eel Pie, and VM Studios
- Mixed at Eden, Mayfair, Townhouse, Farmyard, PWI, Tapestry
- Mastered at Arum at the Master Room
- Sleeve design: David Black
- Photographs: Paul Rider
- Cover illustration: Kathy Felstead
- Inside illustrations: Helen Jones
- House with Hat on illustration: Joanna Roscoe, Soho parish school, London

== Charts ==
Chart (1986)	Peak position
Dutch Albums (Album Top 100)	45
Norwegian Albums (VG-lista)	19
UK Albums (Official Charts)	73
