= Coincidence and Likely Stories =

Studio album by Buffy Sainte-Marie
- Released: January 1992
- Genre: Folk
- Length: 43:08
- Label: Ensign/Chrysalis/EMI
- Producer: Chris Birkett

Buffy Sainte-Marie chronology
Sweet America (1976)	Coincidence and Likely Stories (1992)	Running for the Drum (2009)

Professional ratings
Review scores
Source	Rating
AllMusic	3/5 stars
Rolling Stone	3/5 stars

Coincidence and Likely Stories (1992) is an album by Buffy Sainte-Marie, her first in sixteen years, during which time she had been raising her son and working on the children's television show Sesame Street. The album itself was largely recorded at Sainte-Marie's home before being sent to producer Chris Birkett for the final production and mixing in London.

The album showed her continuing with the electronic music she had first developed on Illuminations and the tribal themes seen on Sweet America, her last pre-retirement album.

The album received favourable reviews and some saw it as her best work since Illuminations. Although it failed to chart in the United States, it became her only album to chart in the UK, and featured two minor hit singles there. Longtime fans embraced it: in 2016, Andrea Warner ranked it as one of her five essential albums.

The album title itself comes from the first line of the song "Disinformation":

- Coincidence and likely stories/they dog your trail like a pack of lies

"Bury My Heart at Wounded Knee" was covered by Indigo Girls on its album 1200 Curfews (1995).

== Track listing ==
All songs composed by Buffy Sainte-Marie except where noted.

1. "The Big Ones Get Away" - 3:49
2. "Fallen Angels" - 3:08
3. "Bad End" - 4:24
4. "Emma Lee" - 4:02
5. "Starwalker" - 3:05
6. "The Priests of the Golden Bull" - 3:51
7. "Disinformation" - 3:48
8. "Getting Started" - 4:31
9. "I'm Going Home" - 3:24
10. "Bury My Heart at Wounded Knee" - 5:16
11. "Goodnight" (Cliff Eberhardt) - 3:50

== Charts ==
Year	Chart	Peak position
1992	UK Albums Chart	39

Singles
Year	Single	Chart	Position
1992	"The Big Ones Get Away"	UK Singles Chart	39
1992	"Fallen Angels"	UK Singles Chart	57
