= Sweet America =

Studio album by Buffy Sainte-Marie
- Released: February 1976
- Recorded: 1975
- Genre: Folk
- Length: 33:06
- Label: ABC
- Producer: Buffy Sainte-Marie, Henry Lewy

Buffy Sainte-Marie chronology
Changing Woman (1975)	Sweet America (1976)	Coincidence and Likely Stories (1992)

Professional ratings
Review scores
Source	Rating
Allmusic	3/5 stars

Sweet America was the twelfth studio album by Buffy Sainte-Marie and her last before retiring from music to work on Sesame Street and in education. The album was dedicated to the American Indian Movement and featured some songs with tribal rhythms and vocals that she was later to develop on her 1992 comeback Coincidence and Likely Stories.

After parting with MCA Records, Sainte-Marie signed with ABC Records, then home of such artists as Steely Dan, the early Pointer Sisters, Isaac Hayes and the James Gang. Although Sweet America received a little more attention from the press than her two MCA albums Buffy and Changing Woman, most reviews were not favorable. When MCA acquired ABC Records in 1979, Sweet America went out of print along with her two MCA albums, and remaining copies were not thereafter circulated. Claims that her retirement was motivated by the collapse of ABC Records are unlikely because she had not been recording for over three years when the label collapsed.

== Track listing ==
All songs written by Buffy Sainte-Marie except where noted.

1. "Sweet America" (Barry Greenfield) – 3:04
2. "Wynken, Blynken and Nod" (Eugene Field, Buffy Sainte-Marie) – 3:08
3. "Where Poets Go" – 2:52
4. "Free the Lady" (Barry Greenfield) – 3:22
5. "America My Home" – 2:32
6. "Look at the Facts" – 2:12
7. "I Don't Need No City Life" – 3:10
8. "Sweet January" – 2:49
9. "Qu'appelle Valley, Saskatchewan" – 3:19
10. "Honey Can You Hang Around" – 3:15
11. "I Been Down" – 2:03
12. "Starwalker" – 2:32
13. "Ain't No Time for the Worrying Blues" – 1:00

=== Track notes ===
- "Wynken, Blynken and Nod" was later recorded by The Doobie Brothers on the 1980 Sesame Street album In Harmony and included on their retrospective box set Long Train Runnin': 1970-2000.
- "Starwalker" was re-recorded on her 1992 comeback album Coincidence and Likely Stories.
- "Sweet America" and the album's first single "Free The Lady" were both recorded originally on writer Barry Greenfield's 1973 RCA album titled Blue Sky.
- "Look at the Facts" was re-recorded (with some lyric changes) and retitled as "Carry It On," on her 2015 album Power in the Blood.
- "Qu'appelle Valley, Saskatchewan" was later covered by British New Wave band Red Box, who released it in 1984 as their second single. It later appeared on their 1985 album The Circle & the Square.
