= SPA (band) =

British pop band

- Origin: United Kingdom
- Genres: Pop
- Years active: 1997
- Label: Northern Sky Music
- Spinoff of: Red Box
- Members: Simon Toulson-Clarke; Phill Brown; Alastair Gavin

SPA are a British band comprising Simon Toulson-Clarke, Phill Brown and Alastair Gavin. Toulson-Clarke and Gavin had previously worked together on the Red Box album Motive.

SPA is an acronym of the names of its members - Simon, Phill and Alastair.

They released their self-titled debut album, SPA, in 1997.

== Discography ==
=== Studio albums ===
- SPA (1997), Northern Sky Music
