= Native North American Child: An Odyssey =

Compilation album by Buffy Sainte-Marie
- Released: 1974
- Recorded: 1964–1972
- Genre: Folk
- Length: 36:12
- Label: Vanguard
- Producer: Maynard Solomon, Jack Nitzsche, Norbert Putnam

Buffy Sainte-Marie chronology
The Best of Buffy Sainte-Marie Vol. 2 (1971)	Native North American Child: An Odyssey (1974)	The Best of the Vanguard Years (2003)

Professional ratings
Review scores
Source	Rating
Allmusic	3.5/5 stars

Native North American Child: An Odyssey is a 1974 compilation album released after Buffy Sainte-Marie's departure from Vanguard Records.

The compilation runs through the native theme in Sainte-Marie's writing, seen clearly in such songs as "Now That the Buffalo's Gone", "He's an Indian Cowboy in the Rodeo", "Soldier Blue", "My Country 'Tis of Thy People You're Dying" and the title tune. Two tracks, "Isketayo Sewow (Cree Call)" and "Way, Way, Way", are unique to this album and the former reflects an interest in traditional Native American music that she was to expand upon just before her retirement on Sweet America.

== Track listing ==
All tracks composed by Buffy Sainte-Marie.

1. "Now That the Buffalo's Gone" - 2:50
2. "Isketayo Sewow (Cree Call)" - 1:18
3. "He's an Indian Cowboy in the Rodeo" - 2:04
4. "Poppies" - 3:02
5. "It's My Way" - 3:36
6. "Moonshot" - 3:43
7. "Soldier Blue" - 3:25
8. "Way, Way, Way" - 1:43
9. "The Piney Wood Hills" - 3:08
10. "My Country 'Tis of Thy People You're Dying" - 6:47
11. "Native North American Child" - 2:13
12. "Little Wheel Spin and Spin" - 2:23
