= Red Box (band) =

British band

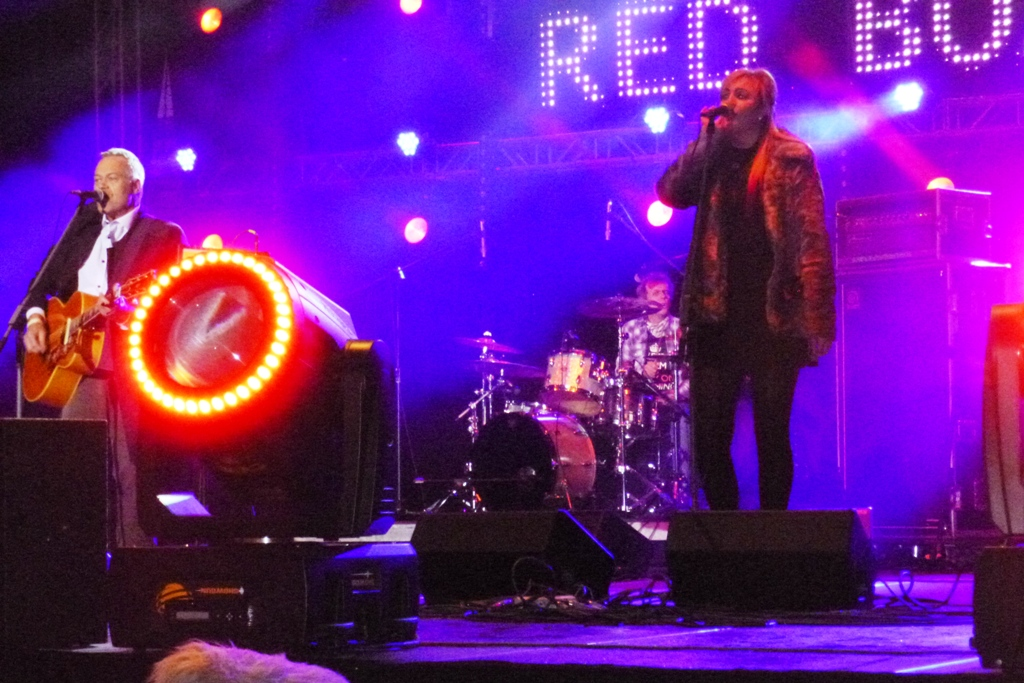
- Red Box in Warsaw 2013

Background information
- Origin: London, England
- Genres: New wave, pop, world music
- Years active: 1983–1990, 2010–present
- Labels: Cherry Red, WEA, EastWest, Sire/Warner Bros. Records (US)
- Members: Simon Toulson-Clarke; Derek Adams; David Jenkins; Jane Milligan; Michał Kirmuć; Katie Toulson-Clarke Associate members: Sally-Jo Seery; Karin Tenggren; Alastair Gavin; Ali Ferguson
- Past members: Julian Close; Chris Wyles; Simon Edwards; Ginny Clee; Paul Bond; Ty Unwin
- Website: redboxmusic.co.uk

Red Box are a British pop group founded by Simon Toulson-Clarke and Julian Close. Active from the early 1980s to the present day, they scored two UK top ten hits with the singles "Lean on Me (Ah-Li-Ayo)" in 1985 and "For America" in 1986, both of which were included on their debut album, The Circle & the Square.

Red Box returned briefly in 1990 with the single "Train" and the second album Motive, and again in 2010 with the third album Plenty, released in October 2010.

In February 2019, the band released "This Is What We Came For", the first single from their fourth studio album Chase the Setting Sun, which was released in September 2019. In July 2019, they released a second single "Gods & Kings", also from Chase the Setting Sun.

== History ==
=== Early years and formation (1978–1984) ===
Simon Toulson-Clarke formed his first band, aged thirteen, at Harrow School with his friend Paddy Talbot (another member of the band was cricketer and insurance executive Matthew Fosh, who said, "two of the guys were talented and two of us were rubbish. I was one of the rubbish ones"), playing covers of Led Zeppelin and Deep Purple as well as some self-penned material. Other early influences are cited as being Marc Bolan, David Bowie, Cream, Pink Floyd, Cat Stevens and particularly Buffy Sainte-Marie. On leaving school, he moved to Middlesbrough and formed another band in the vein of New York Dolls.

In the late 1970s, he travelled south to study at the Polytechnic of Central London where he formed a band with Bristolian Julian Close. Initially the band performed under the name Harlequins and comprised Toulson-Clarke (vocals/guitar) and Close (saxophone) together with Paddy Talbot (keyboards), Rob Legge (bass) and Martin Nickson (drums).

The band later took the name Red Box, after some deliberation, from a box left behind by the rock group Slade following a performance at college (and in which they had since been storing microphones). The name was favoured for its political (Red) connotations – Toulson-Clarke describes the band members as 'Student Activists'. He was also attracted to the notion of square (Box) being an old North American Indian term for 'white man' (circle being the term for 'man' before Europeans were encountered), a concept which would be explored further on the debut The Circle & the Square album in the song "Heart of the Sun", a line from which gave the album its title.

Whilst still students, the band regularly sold-out shows at the Marquee and Moonlight Club and released their debut single "Chenko" on the Cherry Red label in 1983. The record was a hit on radio and brought them to the attention of Seymour Stein, who signed the band to Sire in 1984. Soon after this, the band slimmed down to a duo, took on a more synthpop direction and re-signed direct to WEA, who released their second single "Saskatchewan" (a cover of the Buffy Sainte-Marie song), under the Sire imprint.

=== The Circle and the Square (1985–1987) ===
In August 1985 the duo had their first UK hit single, "Lean on Me (Ah-Li-Ayo)", a song which reached and stayed at number three in the UK top 40 for over a month. It also reached number 1 in five countries and the top 5 in a further 12 giving worldwide exposure to the band. It was promoted with an unusual video (nominated for Best Video at the Brit Awards 1985) in which a British Sign Language (BSL) interpreter provided a translation of the song's lyrics, which led to a feature on BBC2's Newsweek programme.

In 1986, the band released their debut album The Circle & the Square, mixing traditional musical styles – brass ensembles, choral music and chants – with modern rock and synthpop. Among the vocalists drafted in to create the multi-tracked backing vocals (or "Box Vox") is English actor Anthony Head.

The album received praise for its "evocative lyrics" and "global political intelligence" and is notable for introducing 'ethnic rhythms' and elements of World Music into the 1980s pop milieu alongside established artists such as Paul Simon (Graceland, 1986) and Kate Bush (The Sensual World, 1989). It includes a re-worked version of the 1984 Buffy Sainte-Marie cover "Saskatchewan", as well as "Chenko", which was given a more sombre, stately treatment bringing chants to the fore and featuring Alexander Balanescu on violin. Toulson-Clarke and Close, however, found themselves at odds with their record company regarding what it perceived as a lack of mainstream appeal in their choice of material, despite the success of "Lean on Me" in the UK and Europe.

Toulson-Clarke responded to WEA's request for something to appeal to American radio with the sardonic "For America", which lambasted what he saw as the style-over-content approach of the American media, as well as alluding to American military involvement in Grenada and Nicaragua. The song was not a hit in the United States, though it did worldwide outsell "Lean on Me", reaching number one in six countries and the top ten in several others including the UK, where it spent twelve weeks in the chart peaking at number ten.

Two more tracks were released as singles – "Heart of the Sun" and a second re-working of "Chenko" – but both failed to make a significant impact on the charts. Due to increasingly strained working relations between the band and the record company, Close left to work in A & R and Toulson-Clarke took time out from writing and recording to travel.

=== Motive (1990) ===
Toulson-Clarke was persuaded back to recording by Max Hole – a former contact at WEA – who had been given charge of the subsidiary company EastWest. He began work on a new album in collaboration with musician and arranger Alastair Gavin, as well as David Motion (who had produced The Circle & the Square), under the proviso that the 'tribal' elements which contributed so strongly to the sound of the earlier record be toned down.

Motive is less tribal than its predecessor, with several tracks built around piano, brass provided by The Kick Horns and full orchestral arrangements. It also displays a more personal style of writing from Toulson-Clarke (the song "Moving" is dedicated to the memory of Kenneth Roy Wyles – father of Red Box drummer Chris Wyles – who died during recording), combined with the cultural and political allusions of the previous record.

The opening track and first single "Train" begins with the sound of a locomotive gradually picking up speed (and subsequently shunting to a halt at the song's end) and includes samples from the Voix Bulgares, "O Fortuna" (also known as the theme to the Old Spice advertisements) and T.Rex. The hook is provided by singer Jenny Tsao's eccentric vocal refrain during the chorus.

Red Box – Train excerpt
Jenny Tsao and Simon Toulson-Clarke on the 1990 Red Box single "Train"

"Train" was selected as the first single and released in the autumn of 1990. The video was aired on the ITV Chart Show, and the band performed on the re-vamped Juke Box Jury hosted by Jools Holland, with the panel proclaiming the song a hit.

However, a progressively deteriorating relationship between band and label undermined any efforts to promote the single or album. Despite the positive reception for "Train", and for reasons which remain unclear, the song was recalled from retailers. No further singles were issued and the album was eventually released without further publicity. By 'heartfelt agreement on both sides', the band and label parted and the band went into hiatus.

=== Reissues ===
Both The Circle & the Square and Motive received only a limited release on CD. Though the first album was widely released on LP and cassette in 1986, a CD issue was limited to Germany, with a reissue in Japan in 1998.

In light of continued interest in the Red Box back catalogue, a petition was created to show support for the reissue of both albums on CD.

A new recording of "Lean on Me" by Toulson-Clarke and Close was made available through iTunes in September 2007.

The Circle & the Square was re-released on CD by Cherry Red Records on 20 October 2008. It features all 12 tracks from the original album, along with the Cherry Red versions of "Chenko" and "Valley", plus four additional bonus tracks. The second album, Motive, was reissued in the UK in March 2011. The album includes 12 tracks in total, two of which are bonus tracks, the B-side to the "Train" single, "Hello, He Lied", as well as "Train (Fantasy Island Version)".

=== Plenty (2010–present) ===
Plenty is the third album from Red Box, released on Cherry Red Records on 11 October 2010.

The notion of a new album and subsequent reformation of Red Box was first conceived in 2000. While working for East West, Toulson-Clarke signed a band to the label from the USA called The Vulgar Boatmen, releasing an album Opposite Sex in 1996.

Interviewed in 2009, he explained: “A bond of friendship producing heartfelt and honest music reminded me of our early days. I missed it, and I suppose the small notion of Red Box ‘riding again’ planted itself then. I suppose Plenty really began in the woods outside Gainesville, Florida.”

Red Box promoted Plenty with live performances, especially in Poland, where the songs "The Sign" and "Hurricane" achieved number one status on the Trójka Radio charts (5 weeks and 4 weeks respectively). The band consists of:

- Simon Toulson-Clarke – lead vocals and guitar
- Derek Adams – drums, acoustic guitar, backing vocals and banjo
- Dave Jenkins – bass
- Sally-Jo Seery – acoustic guitar and backing vocals
- Jane Milligan – keyboards and backing vocals
- Michal Kirmuc – electric guitar and percussion
- Ali Ferguson – electric guitar and backing vocals
- Karin Tenggren – violin and backing vocals

== Other projects ==
=== Enjoy ===
In 1990, Red Box scored a club hit with "Enjoy" which was essentially a remix, by Paul Oakenfold, of an old B-side, under the Solid Gold Easy Amex name. This record was charted at Number 75 on Independent Radio's Network Chart (also used by Number One Magazine) but missed the Gallup UK Singles Chart as used by the Guinness Book of British Hit Singles.

=== Julian Close ===
Julian Close left the band in 1987 and worked behind the scenes at EMI for several years, eventually becoming Head of A & R. He went on to run the Silent Records label, and, more recently, Tube Recordings. He received an acknowledgement in the Motive sleeve notes as "Sniffy". Nowadays, Julian runs Tube Management, an entertainment company incorporating a record label, music publishing and management.

=== Simon Toulson-Clarke ===
Simon Toulson-Clarke has since balanced various roles as a sound engineer, producer and songwriter for other artists and has worked as a music consultant for East West Records' A & R department. In 1992, he collaborated with Miguel Bosé and Ross Cullum on six songs for Bosé's successful first East West album Under the Sign of Cain (Bajo El Signo de Cain). He also contributed to two songs on the 2007 Miguel Bosé album Papito, sharing co-writing honours with Michael Stipe on the track "Lo Que Hay Es lo Que Ves".

- SPA

In 1997, he collaborated with Phill Brown (who had produced the Cherry Red version of "Chenko") and Alastair Gavin, using the acronym SPA, on a concept album in tribute to American Comedian Bill Hicks.

- Plenty

In 2000, the song "Might As Well Go Home" by Plenty was featured on the soundtrack to the film Saving Grace starring Brenda Blethyn and Craig Ferguson.

== Discography ==
=== Studio albums ===
Title	Details	Peak chart positions		
Title	Details	UK	NLD	NOR
The Circle & the Square	Released: 1986; Label: WEA; Format: LP (WX79), CD (242-037-2)	73	45	19
Motive	Released: 1990; Label: EastWest; Format: LP (WX381), CD (9031-72614-2)	—	—	—
Plenty	Released: 11 October 2010; Label:Cherry Red Records; Format: CD (CDBRED470, CDXRED471)	—	—	—
Chase the Setting Sun	Released: 13 September 2019; Label: Right Track Records; Format: CD, download, streaming	—	—	—
"—" denotes releases that did not chart.

=== Singles ===
Year	Title	Peak chart positions							Certifications	Label
Year	Title	UK	BEL	GER	IRE	NLD	NOR	SWE	Certifications	Label
1983	"Chenko" b/w "Valley"	—	—	—	—	—	—	—		Cherry Red Records CHERRY 73
1984	"Saskatchewan" b/w "Speeches"	122	—	—	—	—	—	—		Sire Records W 9157
1985	"Lean on Me (Ah-Li-Ayo)" b/w "Stinging Bee"	3	—	27	2	—	—	—	BPI: Silver	Sire Records W 8926
1986	"For America" b/w "R n' A" ("R n' A" is built around the chant from "Chenko" recorded in reverse)	10	2	—	6	6	2	12		Sire Records YZ 84
1987	"Heart of the Sun" b/w "Enjoy (Solid Gold Easy Amex)"	71	—	—	—	—	—	—		Sire Records YZ 100
1987	"Chenko (Tenka-Io)" b/w "Speeches"	77	—	—	—	—	—	—		Sire Records YX 125
1990	"Enjoy" (Paul Oakenfold Future Mix) (edit) (as Solid Gold Easy Amex featuring Red Box) b/w "Enjoy (Original Golden Lay)"	75^{*}	—	—	—	—	—	—		EastWest YZ 466
1990	"Train" b/w "'Hello' He Lied"	—	—	—	—	—	—	—		EastWest YZ 531
2007	"Lean on Me" (digital single)	—	—	—	—	—	—	—		Silent Songs
2010	"Hurricane"/"Brighter Blue" (digital single)	—	—	—	—	—	—	—		Cherry Red Records
2011	"The Sign" (digital single)	—	—	—	—	—	—	—		Cherry Red Records
2012	"Let It Rain" (Remix) b/w "Never Let It Be Said" (digital single)	—	—	—	—	—	—	—		Cherry Red Records
2019	"This Is What We Came For" (digital single)	—	—	—	—	—	—	—		Right Track Records
2019	"Gods & Kings" (digital single)	—	—	—	—	—	—	—		Right Track Records
2020	"Ho Ho!" (Radio Edit) (digital single)	—	—	—	—	—	—	—		Right Track Records
2020	"Us and Them" (digital single)	—	—	—	—	—	—	—		Right Track Records
"—" denotes releases that did not chart.

^{*} Network chart
