= Plenty (album) =

Studio album by Red Box
- Released: 11 October 2010
- Genre: Pop
- Length: 54:42
- Label: Cherry Red
- Producer: Simon Toulson-Clarke

Red Box chronology
Motive (1990)	Plenty (2010)

Singles from Plenty
- 1. "Hurricane"/"Brighter Blue" Released: 27 September 2010; 2. "The Sign" Released: 23 May 2011; 3. "Let It Rain" Released: 13 February 2012

Professional ratings
Review scores
Source	Rating
Allmusic	3.5/5 stars
Mojo	4/5 stars
Rockfeedback	4/5 stars

Plenty is the third album from Red Box, and was released on 11 October 2010.

== The Plenty Sessions ==
The album was also released as a "Limited Edition" which included an exclusive six track bonus CD. Subsequently, these tracks were made available as digital downloads under the name The Plenty Sessions.

== Sales performance ==
Plenty was Cherry Red Records' best selling album for the months October to December 2010.

== Audio previews ==
Four tracks from the album can be previewed in their entirety on the SoundCloud: Red Box - Plenty samples page.

== Track listing ==
=== Cherry Red Records CD: CDBRED470 ===
No.	Title	Writer(s)	Length
1.	"Stay"	Simon Toulson-Clarke/Steve Carr	3:49
2.	"Hurricane"	Toulson-Clarke/Derek Adams/Carr	4:18
3.	"Without"	Toulson-Clarke/Carr/Simon Cole	4:22
4.	"Plenty"	Toulson-Clarke/Carr/Cole	3:31
5.	"The Sign"	Toulson-Clarke/Adams	4:11
6.	"Brighter Blue"	Toulson-Clarke/Carr	3:39
7.	"I've Been Thinking of You"	Toulson-Clarke/Carr/Cole	3:28
8.	"Don't Let Go"	Toulson-Clarke/Carr/Cole	3:53
9.	"Say What's in Your Head"	Toulson-Clarke/Adams/Paul Bond	4:08
10.	"It's True"	Toulson-Clark/Carr/Adams	2:57
11.	"Sacred Wall"	Toulson-Clarke/Carr/Cole	3:48
12.	"Let It Rain"	Toulson-Clark/Adams	5:07
13.	"Green"	Toulson-Clarke/Carr/Cole	3:16
14.	"Never Let It Be Said"	Toulson-Clark/Adams	4:14
Total length:			54:42

The Plenty Sessions digital album cover

=== Cherry Red Records Bonus CD: CDXRED471 - "The Plenty Sessions" ===
No.	Title	Writer(s)	Length
1.	"Once I Dreamed"	Simon Toulson-Clarke/Steve Carr/Simon Cole	3:12
2.	"Take My Hand for a While"	Buffy Sainte-Marie	2:21
3.	"What Was I Supposed to Do?"	Toulson-Clarke/Derek Adams/Carr/Cole	3:31
4.	"Sun and the Sea"	Toulson-Clarke/Adams	3:03
5.	"Martha Jackson"	Toulson-Clarke/Carr/Cole	3:06
6.	"Everybody's Got to Learn Sometime"	James Warren	4:23
Total length:			19:36

== Personnel ==
=== Musicians ===
"Stay"

- Simon Toulson-Clarke - Lead vocal and acoustic guitar
- Derek Adams - Acoustic guitar
- Steve Carr - Harmony vocal and harmonica
- Simon Cole - Piano
- Munch - Organ
- Alastair Gavin - String arrangement

"Hurricane"

- Simon Toulson-Clarke - Lead vocal and acoustic guitar
- Derek Adams - Electric guitar and drums
- Paul Bond - Electric guitar
- Ty Unwin - Keyboards
- Lloyd Green - Bass guitar

"Without"

- Simon Toulson-Clarke - Lead vocal, acoustic and electric guitars
- Steve Carr - Harmony vocal and bass guitar
- Derek Adams - Drums and electric guitar
- Emily Maguire - Backwards viola and cello
- Simon Cole - Organ
- Alastair Gavin - Additional organ

"Plenty"

- Simon Toulson-Clarke - Lead vocal and acoustic guitar
- Steve Carr - Harmony vocal, bass guitar and melodica
- Alastair Gavin - Organ
- Simon Cole - Drums
- Derek Adams - Backing vocal and percussion
- Paul Bond - Backing vocal

"The Sign"

- Simon Toulson-Clarke - Lead vocal, acoustic, electric and bass guitars
- Derek Adams - Acoustic guitar, drums and backing vocal
- Paul Bond - Electric guitar and backing vocal
- Ty Unwin - Keyboards and strings
- Emily Maguire, Lorna Gallagher and Julia Hobsbawn - Box Vox
- Simon Toulson-Clarke and Alastair Gavin - String arrangement

"Brighter Blue"

- Simon Toulson-Clarke - Lead vocal and acoustic guitar
- Derek Adams - Mandolin, drums and percussion
- Emily Maguire - Viola and harmony vocal
- Jonathan Isley - Acoustic guitar
- Frey Smith - Double bass
- Steve Carr - Harmony vocal

"I've Been Thinking of You"

- Simon Toulson-Clarke - Lead vocal, acoustic and bass guitars
- Steve Carr - Harmony vocal, acoustic guitar and harmonica
- Simon Cole - Piano
- Derek Adams - Drums
- Emily Maguire - Cello

"Don't Let Go"

- Simon Toulson-Clarke - Lead vocal, acoustic and electric guitars
- Steve Carr - Harmony vocal and bass guitar
- Derek Adams - Drums
- Simon Cole - Piano
- Paul Bond - Electric guitar
- Ty Unwin - Keyboards
- Alastair Gavin - Additional string arrangement

"Say What's in Your Head"

- Simon Toulson-Clarke - Lead vocal, acoustic guitar and orchestration
- Derek Adams - Banjo, electric piano and drums
- Paul Bond - Bass
- Sid Ek - Percussion

"It's True"

- Simon Toulson-Clarke - Lead vocal and acoustic guitar
- Derek Adams - Electric piano and percussion
- Steve Carr - Harmony vocal and electric guitar
- John Prestage - Trumpet

"Sacred Wall"

- Simon Toulson-Clarke - Lead vocal
- Derek Adams - Electric guitar
- Simon Cole - Piano
- Emily Maguire - Viola
- Steve Carr - Harmonica
- Alastair Gavin - String arrangement

"Let It Rain"

- Simon Toulson-Clarke - Lead vocal, acoustic and electric guitars
- Derek Adams - Electric guitar and drums
- Paul Bond - Bass and electric guitar
- Ty Unwin - Keyboards
- John Prestage - Trumpet
- Mick Hutchins - additional electric guitar

"Green"

- Simon Toulson-Clarke - Lead vocal and acoustic guitar
- Steve Carr - Harmony vocal and bass guitar
- Simon Cole - Piano
- Jonathan Isley - Acoustic guitar and drums
- Emily Maguire - Viola and cello
- Derek Adams - Percussion

"Never Let It Be Said"

- Simon Toulson-Clarke - Lead vocal, acoustic guitar and strings
- Derek Adams - Bass, banjo and strings
- Ty Unwin - Piano and strings
- Paul Bond - Electric guitar
- Buffy Sainte-Marie - Vocal sample

"Once I Dreamed"

- Simon Toulson-Clarke - Lead vocal and acoustic guitar
- Steve Carr - Harmony vocal and bass guitar
- Derek Adams - Acoustic guitar and drums
- Simon Cole - Piano
- Emily Maguire - Viola and cello

"Take My Hand for a While"

- Simon Toulson-Clarke - Lead vocal and acoustic guitar
- Steve Carr - Harmony vocal
- Sid Ek - Piano
- Frey Smith - Acoustic bass
- Alastair Gavin - String arrangement

=== Production ===
- Simon Toulson-Clarke - Producer
- Matt Butler and Simon Toulson-Clarke - Mixing
- Simon Toulson-Clarke and Matt Butler - Engineering
- Phill Brown and Will Bartle - Additional engineering
- Dick Beetham - Mastering
- Alastair Gavin - String arrangement and conductor
- Alexander Balanesco - Orchestra leader
- Recorded at Olive Road, Yellow Shark and Chapel Studios
- Mixed at Yellow Shark
- Mastered at 360 Mastering
