= Buffy Sainte-Marie: Carry It On =

- Directed by: Madison Thomas
- Written by: Andrea Warner; Madison Thomas
- Produced by: Stephen Paniccia; Lisa Meeches
- Starring: Buffy Sainte-Marie
- Cinematography: Gabriel Levesque; Andy Hourahine; Jon Elliott
- Edited by: Brina Romanek
- Music by: Justin Delorme
- Production companies: White Pine Pictures; Eagle Vision; Paquin Entertainment
- Distributed by: White Pine Pictures
- Release date: September 8, 2022 (TIFF)
- Running time: 106 minutes
- Country: Canada
- Language: English

Buffy Sainte-Marie: Carry It On is a 2022 Canadian documentary film, directed by Madison Thomas. The film is a portrait of the life and career of musician and activist Buffy Sainte-Marie. Andrea Warner, the writer, also wrote a 2018 biography, Buffy Sainte-Marie: The Authorized Biography.

The film premiered at the 2022 Toronto International Film Festival on September 8, 2022.

The film was honoured with the DGC Allan King Award for Best Documentary Film at the 2022 Directors Guild of Canada awards.

The film was awarded the 2023 Canadian Screen Award for Best Direction of a Documentary and Best Sound on a Documentary.

In November 2023, the film was awarded an International Emmy Award for Best Arts Programming.
