= Cradleboard Teaching Project =

Native American education organization

- Formation: 1997
- Founder: Buffy Sainte-Marie
- Services: Public education; Native American culture
- Website: http://cradleboard.org/

Cradleboard Teaching Project, founded in 1997 by singer/songwriter Buffy Sainte-Marie, has developed a curriculum that aims to raise self-identity and self-esteem in present and future generations of Native American children by introducing them to enriching, accurate information about Native American people and cultures.

== History ==
In 1997, the Cradleboard Teaching Project was founded and financed with money from Buffy Sainte-Marie's non-profit philanthropic project the Nihewan Foundation for American Indian Education and a grant from W.K. Kellogg Foundation. Additional financial support has been made available from Ford Foundation, the Lyn and Norman Lear Family Foundation, The Herb Alpert Foundation, private donations and sale of curriculum materials.

== Program ==
The program uses the internet email, chat rooms, bulletin boards, interactive web sites, videoconferencing, along with multi-media resources and other more traditional media. Teachers and students are introduced to the curriculum via an Electronic Powwow which presents relevant information via the web, and gives opportunities to interact with others via Chat Rooms and discussion boards.

After a period of initial exposure to the curriculum via the Powwow, teachers are offered the opportunity to participate with other veteran teachers and students in a Cradleboard Cross Cultural Partnering Program which partners Indian and non-Indian students and teachers to explore their understanding of Native American cultures. Telephone contact and live meetings are also used here to extend personal intercultural understanding.

The core curriculum includes courses about geography, social studies, history, science and music at each of three grade levels—elementary school, middle school and high school grades. All units are developed to give a Native American perspective about each subject to all students. To achieve this, the project has involved members of various Native American tribes in the ongoing development process.

The Cradleboard project was selected as one of over 300 promising practices identified by President Clinton's One America Initiative on Race.
