= Item Building =

- U.S. National Register of Historic Places
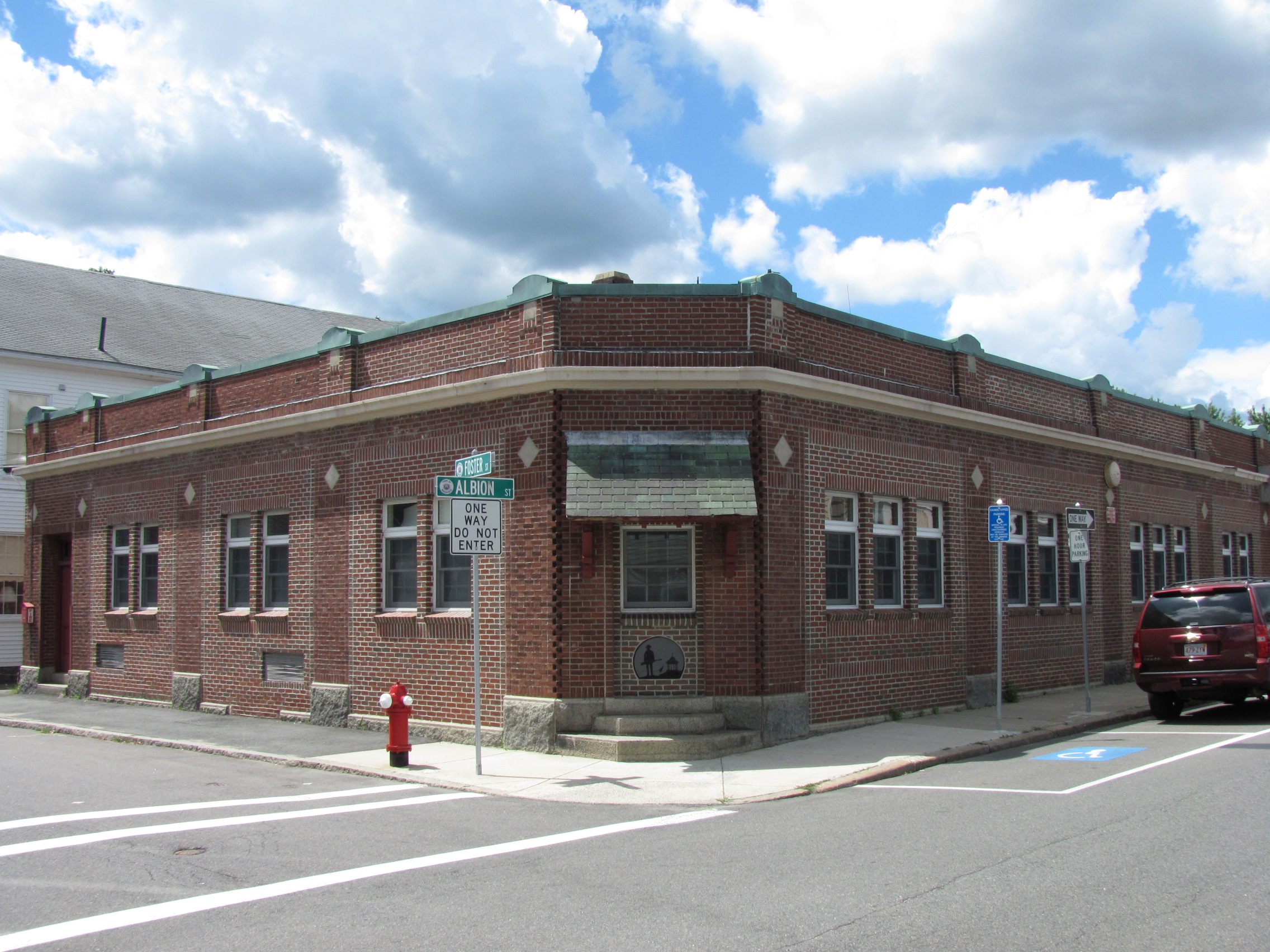
- Item Building

- Location within Massachusetts Location within the United States
- Location: 26 Albion St., Wakefield, Massachusetts
- Coordinates: 42°30′11″N 71°4′19″W
- Built: 1912
- MPS: Wakefield MRA
- NRHP reference No.: 89000712
- Added to NRHP: July 6, 1989

The Item Building is a historic commercial building at 26 Albion Street in Wakefield, Massachusetts. Built in 1912, the single-story brick building serves as the headquarters of The Wakefield Daily Item, Wakefield's main community newspaper, and is a well-kept example of early 20th century commercial architecture.

== Description and history ==
The building is located at the southwest corner of Albion and Foster Streets, one block west of Wakefield's central business district. It is a single-story brick building, with a granite foundation, brick and cast stone trim elements, and a flat roof. The Foster Street facade is four bays long, with an entrance in the leftmost bay, while the Albion Street facade is eight bays in length. The first five are original, while the latter three are a mid-20th century addition. An angle at the corner originally provided the main entrance, but has now been bricked over and replaced by a window. A Craftsman-style shed-roof hood remains over the window. The main entrance is now in the fifth bay under a metal marquee. The fenestrated bays of the building were originally pairs of plate glass with granite sills, demarcated by brick piers. These bays have now been largely filled with brick and pairs of sash windows.

The Wakefield Daily Item began publishing in 1895, and was the first local newspaper in New England that had its own printing facilities. In 1912, Harris M. Dolbeare, the publisher, had this building constructed to house its newsroom and printing operations. The building was enlarged by three bays along Albion Street in the mid-20th century.

The building was listed on the National Register of Historic Places on July 6, 1989.

== See also ==
- National Register of Historic Places listings in Wakefield, Massachusetts
- National Register of Historic Places listings in Middlesex County, Massachusetts
