= The Best of Buffy Sainte-Marie Vol. 2 =

Greatest hits album by Buffy Sainte-Marie
- Released: 1971
- Recorded: 1964–1969
- Genre: Folk
- Length: 66:07
- Label: Vanguard
- Producer: Maynard Solomon

Buffy Sainte-Marie chronology
The Best of Buffy Sainte-Marie (1970)	The Best of Buffy Sainte-Marie Vol. 2 (1971)	Native North American Child: An Odyssey (1974)

Professional ratings
Review scores
Source	Rating
Allmusic	3/5 stars

The Best of Buffy Sainte-Marie Vol. 2 is a compilation double album released by Vanguard Records in 1971 covering a large proportion of the material she had released on her first six albums for the label that was not found on the previous year's The Best of Buffy Sainte-Marie.

Unlike her first compilation, The Best of Buffy Sainte-Marie Vol. 2 does contain two tracks that were never released on any album - "Gonna Feel Much Better When You're Gone", which was never otherwise released, and "From the Bottom of My Heart", which was available on the "I'm Gonna Be a Country Girl Again" single that was charting in the UK at the time.

== Track listing ==
All tracks composed by Buffy Sainte-Marie except where indicated.

1. "It's My Way"^{1} - 3:34
2. "He's a Pretty Good Man If You Ask Me"^{5} - 2:28
3. "Hey Little Bird"^{4} - 2:13
4. "Song to a Seagull"^{4} (Joni Mitchell) - 3:22
5. "Adam"^{6} (Richie Havens) - 5:05
6. "Mary"^{6} - 1:32
7. "He Lived Alone in Town"^{1} - 4:41
8. "Johnny Be Fair"^{2} - 1:49
9. "Reynardine" [A Vampire Legend]^{4} (Traditional) - 2:59
10. "Gonna Feel Much Better When You're Gone"^{8} - 1:49
11. "Tall Trees in Georgia"^{5} - 3:33
12. "The Carousel"^{4} - 2:33
13. "Poppies"^{6} - 2:51
14. "From the Bottom of My Heart"^{7} - 2:34
15. "Lyke Wake Dirge"^{4} (Benjamin Britten/Traditional) - 3:48
16. "Welcome, Welcome Emigrante"^{2} - 2:16
17. "Eyes of Amber"^{1} - 2:20
18. "Babe in Arms"^{1} - 2:33
19. "Ananias"^{1} - 2:40
20. "97 Men in This Here Town"/"Don't Call Me Honey"^{8} - 3:06
21. "Uncle Joe"^{5} (Traditional) - 2:11
22. "T'es pas un autre" ("Until It's Time for You to Go")^{4} - 2:57
23. "The Seeds of Brotherhood"^{4} - 1:29
24. "The Angel"^{6} (Ed Freeman) - 3:25
- ^{1} - From It's My Way!
- ^{2} - From Many a Mile
- ^{3} - From Little Wheel Spin and Spin
- ^{4} - From Fire & Fleet & Candlelight
- ^{5} - From I'm Gonna Be a Country Girl Again
- ^{6} - From Illuminations
- ^{7} - Unavailable on album; B-side of single "I'm Gonna Be a Country Girl Again"
- ^{8} - Previously unreleased
