= Buffy (album) =

Studio album by Buffy Sainte-Marie
- Released: March 1974
- Recorded: 1973
- Genre: Folk
- Length: 34:30
- Label: MCA
- Producer: Norbert Putnam

Buffy Sainte-Marie chronology
Quiet Places (1973)	Buffy (1974)	Changing Woman (1975)

Buffy is the tenth album by Buffy Sainte-Marie and her first after she and Vanguard Records parted ways, with whom her relationship had not been on the best of terms for several years.

Despite being on a different label from its predecessor Quiet Places, Buffy was recorded with essentially the same personnel with Norbert Putnam on bass, David Briggs on keyboards, Kenny Malone on drums, along with the Memphis Horns. Together, these gave a sound far removed from her initial folk roots and much closer to ordinary rock. Indeed, Buffy was recorded at much the same time and place as Quiet Places and no label took it up until her last Vanguard recordings had been released.

Buffy commanded a high price tag upon completion. Very few music magazines, however, ever bothered to review it and Buffy was out of print as early as 1978.

The album cover also caused MCA and Sainte-Marie a public relations problem. Buffy posed with an exposed breast and did not want it covered or censored. There was also a picture of an animal on the flip side of her coat, giving the impression that the animal was right near her exposed breast. This caused some retailers in the United States and some other countries to refuse to carry the album. MCA had a price sticker placed over the controversial portion of the album cover which concealed the breast, until the album's shrink wrap was removed.

The album was only rereleased in 2008 with Changing Woman and Sweet America on the compilation album The Pathfinder: Buried Treasures - The Mid-70's Recordings.

== Track listing ==
All songs written by Buffy Sainte-Marie except where noted.

Side A
No.	Title	Length
1.	"Can't Believe the Feeling When You're Gone"	3:05
2.	"I've Really Fallen for You"	3:01
3.	"Sweet Little Vera"	4:53
4.	"Star Boy"	5:21

Side B
No.	Title	Writer(s)	Length
1.	"Sweet, Fast Hooker Blues"		2:08
2.	"Generation"		3:00
3.	"Hey! Baby Howdja Do Me This Way?"		3:44
4.	"I Can't Take It No More"	Norbert Putnam, John Reid	3:06
5.	"Waves"		3:21
6.	"That's the Way You Fall in Love"		2:51
