= Medicine Songs =

Studio album by Buffy Sainte-Marie
- Released: November 10, 2017
- Genre: Folk, rock, First Nations music
- Label: True North Records
- Producer: Buffy Sainte-Marie, Chris Birkett, Jon Levine

Buffy Sainte-Marie chronology
Power in the Blood (2015)	Medicine Songs (2017)

Professional ratings
Aggregate scores
Source	Rating
Metacritic	81/100
Review scores
Source	Rating
AllMusic	4/5 stars
Exclaim!	8/10

Medicine Songs is the sixteenth and final studio album by Buffy Sainte-Marie, released November 10, 2017, on True North Records. The album includes both new material and contemporary re-recordings of some of her older songs. Medicine Songs is Sainte-Marie's final album before her retirement from music on 2023.

It was preceded by the single "You Got to Run (Spirit of the Wind)", a collaboration with Tanya Tagaq.

== Background ==
Described by Sainte-Marie as "a collection of front-line songs of unity and resistance," Medicine Songs was released November 10, 2017 by True North Records. Produced in collaboration with Chris Birkett, the album features reworked and re-recorded material from throughout Sainte-Marie's career.

== Promotion ==
As part of the Polaris Collaboration Session series, a video featuring Sainte-Marie and Tagaq performing "You Got to Run (Spirit of the Wind)" was released in February 2017. A music video for "The War Racket" was released in February 2018, animated by Kurt Swinghammer. Sainte-Marie promoted the album in late 2017, giving radio, podcast, print and television interviews where she often reflected on how she was blacklisted by mainstream American radio in the 1960s and 70s, as well as issues related to reconciliation.

== Reception ==
Described by one reviewer as "unflinching in its focus," Medicine Songs was a follow-up from 2015's Power in the Blood. Receiving generally positive reviews, one critic bemoaned the "flattening of time and history" with re-recorded protest songs losing some of the signature features of their times, and with the songs ordered out of chronological sequence.

== Awards ==
At the Juno Awards of 2018, the album won the award for Indigenous Music Album of the Year. It was also a nominee for Contemporary Roots Album of the Year, but did not win in that category.

In 2025, after the revocation of Sainte-Marie's membership in the Order of Canada on the grounds that the questions about her indigenous status meant that she could no longer provide satisfactory proof of Canadian citizenship at all, the album's Juno Award was revoked.

The album won the Best Folk Album award at the 2018 Indigenous Music Awards.

== Track listing ==
All tracks are written by Buffy Sainte-Marie, except where noted

No.	Title	Writer(s)	Length
1.	"You Got to Run (Spirit of the Wind)" (feat. Tanya Tagaq)		3:42
2.	"The War Racket"		4:00
3.	"Starwalker"		3:05
4.	"My Country 'Tis of Thy People You're Dying"		5:35
5.	"America the Beautiful"	Katherine Lee Bates, Samuel A. Ward; new music and lyrics by Buffy Sainte-Marie	2:54
6.	"Carry It On"		2:59
7.	"Little Wheel Spin and Spin"		3:00
8.	"No No Keshagesh"		4:46
9.	"Soldier Blue"		3:42
10.	"The Priests of the Golden Bull"		4:06
11.	"Bury My Heart at Wounded Knee"		4:33
12.	"Universal Soldier"		2:41
13.	"Power in the Blood"	Alabama 3, modified lyrics by Buffy Sainte-Marie	4:05
14.	"Disinformation" (digital bonus track)		3:45
15.	"Fallen Angels" (digital bonus track)		3:45
16.	"Now That the Buffalo's Gone" (digital bonus track)		2:47
17.	"Generation" (digital bonus track)		4:02
18.	"Working for the Government" (digital bonus track)		3:36
19.	"The Big Ones Get Away" (digital bonus track)		4:07
20.	"The War Racket" (Unplugged - digital bonus track)		3:57
