= Quiet Places =

Studio album by Buffy Sainte-Marie
- Released: November 1973
- Recorded: 1973
- Genre: Folk
- Length: 35:36
- Label: Vanguard
- Producer: Norbert Putnam, Buffy Sainte-Marie

Buffy Sainte-Marie chronology
| Moonshot (1972) | Quiet Places (1973) | Buffy (1974) |

Professional ratings
Review scores
| Source | Rating |
|---|---|
| AllMusic | 2/5 stars |
| Encyclopedia of Popular Music | 2/5 stars |
| Rolling Stone | (mixed) |

Quiet Places is Buffy Sainte-Marie's ninth album and her last for Vanguard Records, with whom she had had a very strained relationship ever since the financial disaster of the experimental Illuminations. In fact, her next album, Buffy, had already been recorded before Quiet Places was actually released and was not to find a label for many months after she had completely broken with Vanguard.

Musically, Quiet Places covered similar territory to her previous album, and was again recorded in Nashville with Norbert Putnam co-producing and such session stalwarts as the Memphis Horns and keyboardist David Briggs backing her voice and guitar. Quiet Places failed to dent the Billboard Top 200.

== Track listing ==
All songs composed by Buffy Sainte-Marie except where noted.

1. "Why You Been Gone So Long" (Mickey Newbury) – 2:56
2. "No One Told Me" – 3:05
3. "For Free" (Joni Mitchell) – 4:07
4. "She'll Be Coming 'Round the Mountain When She Comes" – 2:29
5. "Clair Vol's Young Son" – 2:23
6. "Just That Kind of Man" – 2:47
7. "Quiet Places" – 2:31
8. "Have You Seen My Baby? (Hold On)" (Randy Newman) – 3:12
9. "There's No One in the World Like Caleb" – 2:58
10. "Civilization" (Boudleaux Bryant) – 2:20
11. "Eventually" (Gerry Goffin, Carole King) – 3:37
12. "The Jewels of Hanalei" – 3:11

== Personnel ==
- Buffy Sainte-Marie – vocals, guitar, piano
- Charlie McCoy, Billy Sanford – guitar
- Norbert Putnam – bass
- David Briggs – piano, organ
- Kenny Buttrey – drums, percussion
- Memphis Horns – horns
- Sid Sharp Strings – strings
