= Lean on Me (Ah-Li-Ayo) =

1985 single by Red Box

Single by Red Box

from the album The Circle & the Square
- B-side: "Stinging Bee"
- Released: 1985
- Length: 4:32, 6:42
- Label: Sire
- Songwriter(s): Simon Toulson-Clarke
- Producer(s): David Motion

Red Box singles chronology
"Saskatchewan" (1984)	"Lean on Me (Ah-Li-Ayo)" (1985)	"For America" (1986)

"Lean on Me (Ah-Li-Ayo)" is a song by British group Red Box, released in 1985 as the third single from the debut album, The Circle & the Square. It is the band's highest-charting single in the United Kingdom, reaching No. 3 in October 1985. The song borrows from North American Indian rhythms.

== Track listings ==
7-inch single

No.	Title	Length
1.	"Lean on Me (Ah-Li-Ayo)"	4:15
2.	"Stinging Bee"	4:36

12-inch single

No.	Title	Length
1.	"Lean on Me (Ah-Li-Ayo)" (Dogmatix)	6:42
2.	"Stinging Bee" (Catmatix)	4:38
3.	"Lean on Me (Ah-Li-Ayo)"	4:32

== Charts ==
=== Weekly charts ===
Chart (1985–1986)	Peak position
Australia (Kent Music Report)	29
Europe (European Hot 100 Singles)	27
Ireland (IRMA)	2
UK Singles (OCC)	3
West Germany (GfK)	27

=== Year-end charts ===
Chart (1985)	Position
UK Singles (OCC)	36
