= Buffy Sainte-Marie: The Authorized Biography =

Biography by Andrea Warner

Buffy Sainte-Marie: The Authorized Biography is a book by Andrea Warner, published by Greystone Books in 2018. It is about Buffy Sainte-Marie.

Warner stated that she wrote the book because she saw more material about other prominent artists compared to Sainte-Marie. Warner and Sainte-Marie had worked together in the writing of the book.

In 2018, writer Alicia Elliott stated that the book had had "careful research" of the historical details of the biography Sainte-Marie gave to Warner.

== Background ==
Warner worked as a producer for CBC Music. Warner and St. Marie became friends as the book developed.

== Reception ==
Ryan B. Patrick of the Canadian Broadcasting Corporation stated in 2018 that it was "the definitive[...]biography" on the subject.

Will Smith of the University of Stirling wrote in 2021 that the author demonstrated "an embracing philosophy, seeking to free us from further iterations of colonialism and greed which affect us all."

Sue Carter of the Toronto Star stated that the work has a "warm conversational tone" that reflects the relationship between the writer and the biography subject.

== Legacy ==
Warner later was the writer for the film Buffy Sainte-Marie: Carry It On.
