= Motive (album) =

Studio album by Red Box
- Released: 1990
- Genre: Pop
- Length: 51:19
- Label: East West
- Producer: Jon Kelly, Alastair Gavin and Simon Toulson-Clarke; David Motion and Simon Toulson-Clarke

Red Box chronology
| The Circle & the Square (1986) | Motive (1990) | Plenty (2010) |

Singles from Motive
- 1. "Train" Released: 1990

Professional ratings
Review scores
| Source | Rating |
|---|---|
| Allmusic | 4/5 stars |

Motive is the second album from Red Box and was released in 1990.

== Track listing ==
All songs written and composed by Simon Toulson-Clarke, except where noted.

=== East West Records LP: WX381 ===
Side one
| No. | Title | Writer(s) | Length |
|---|---|---|---|
| 1. | "Train" | Simon Toulson-Clarke, David Motion | 4:02 |
| 2. | "Moving" | Toulson-Clarke, Alastair Gavin | 5:26 |
| 3. | "Hungry" | Toulson-Clarke, Gavin | 4:53 |
| 4. | "The Clapping Song" | Toulson-Clarke, Gavin | 6:45 |
| 5. | "Soldier of Love" | | 4:42 |
| Total length: | | | 25:47 |

Side two
| No. | Title | Writer(s) | Length |
|---|---|---|---|
| 1. | "The Power is Down" | Toulson-Clarke, Gavin | 5:43 |
| 2. | "Now Ask" | Toulson-Clarke, Gavin | 6:05 |
| 3. | "Casbah" | Toulson-Clarke, Motion | 3:30 |
| 4. | "Walk on My Hands" | | 5:10 |
| 5. | "New England" | | 5:04 |
| Total length: | | | 25:32 |

=== East West Records CD: WX381CD ===
| No. | Title | Writer(s) | Length |
|---|---|---|---|
| 1. | "Train" | Simon Toulson-Clarke, David Motion | 4:02 |
| 2. | "Moving" | Toulson-Clarke, Alastair Gavin | 5:26 |
| 3. | "Hungry" | Toulson-Clarke, Gavin | 4:53 |
| 4. | "The Clapping Song" | Toulson-Clarke, Gavin | 6:45 |
| 5. | "Soldier of Love" | | 4:42 |
| 6. | "The Power is Down" | Toulson-Clarke, Gavin | 5:43 |
| 7. | "Now Ask" | Toulson-Clarke, Gavin | 6:05 |
| 8. | "Casbah" | Toulson-Clarke, Motion | 3:30 |
| 9. | "Walk on My Hands" | | 5:10 |
| 10. | "New England" | | 5:04 |
| Total length: | | | 51:19 |

=== 2011 - Cherry Pop CD: CR POP 80 ===
| No. | Title | Writer(s) | Length |
|---|---|---|---|
| 1. | "Train" | Simon Toulson-Clarke, David Motion | 4:01 |
| 2. | "Moving" | Toulson-Clarke, Alastair Gavin | 5:26 |
| 3. | "Hungry" | Toulson-Clarke, Gavin | 4:53 |
| 4. | "The Clapping Song" | Toulson-Clarke, Gavin | 6:45 |
| 5. | "Soldier of Love" | | 4:42 |
| 6. | "The Power is Down" | Toulson-Clarke, Gavin | 5:43 |
| 7. | "Now Ask" | Toulson-Clarke, Gavin | 6:05 |
| 8. | "Casbah" | Toulson-Clarke, Motion | 3:30 |
| 9. | "Walk on My Hands" | | 5:10 |
| 10. | "New England" | | 5:09 |
| 11. | ""Hello", He Lied" | Toulson-Clarke, Gavin | 4:31 |
| 12. | "Train (Fantasy Island Version)" | Toulson-Clarke, Motion | 5:07 |
| Total length: | | | 61:01 |

== Personnel ==
Musicians

- Simon Toulson-Clarke - Vocals, Acoustic guitar
- Steve Carter - Bass
- Alastair Gavin - Keyboards
- Neil Taylor - Electric guitar, Acoustic guitar
- Chris Wyles - Drums, Percussion, Programming

Additional musicians

- Backing vocals - Steve Carter, Stephanie Johnson, Martin Noakes, Sue Thomas, Jennie Tsao, Mari Wilson
- Kick Horns:
  Simon Clarke - Alto saxophone, Baritone saxophone, Flute
  Roddy Lorimer - Trumpet, Flugelhorn
  Tim Saunders - Tenor sax
- Trombone - Peter Thoms
- Additional percussion - Luis Jardim
- Train sound designer - Jesper Siberg (the Dane with the DAT)
- S1000 programming on "Train" - Brian Pugsley
- Percussion on "Casbah" - Sam Ramzy

Production

- Produced by Jon Kelly, Alastair Gavin and Simon Toulson-Clarke
- "Train", "Casbah" and "Train (Fantasy Island Version)" produced by David Motion and Simon Toulson-Clarke
- "Walk on My Hands" and "Soldier of Love" additional production and mixed by David Motion
- Engineered by Hugo Nicholson, Richard Moakes
- "Train" and "Casbah" engineered by Felix Kendall
- Orchestral arrangements by Gavin Wright and Alistair Gavin
- Horns arranged by the Kick Horns
- "Now Ask" horns arranged by Kicks Horns and Alistair Gavin
- "Train (Fantasy Island Version)" remixed by Marc Fox
- Sleeve by Industria
