= Long Train Runnin': 1970–2000 =

Box set by the Doobie Brothers
- Released: September 14, 1999
- Genres: Rock; yacht rock; soft rock; pop; blue-eyed soul
- Length: 4:48:35
- Label: Rhino
- Producer: Various

The Doobie Brothers chronology
Rockin' down the Highway: The Wildlife Concert (1996)	Long Train Runnin': 1970–2000 (1999)	Sibling Rivalry (2000)

Long Train Runnin': 1970–2000 is a four disc box set by the American rock band the Doobie Brothers, released on September 14, 1999, by Rhino Entertainment.

== Contents ==
Long Train Runnin': 1970–2000 contains four discs featuring various tracks recorded between 1970 and 1999, with the reason for the title of the set stating the tracks were recorded between 1970 and 2000 is that there a cover of Thurston Harris' "Little Bitty Pretty One" that was released on Japanese version of Sibling Rivalry, which was released in 2000. The first three discs contain tracks included on the band's studio albums up until 1991's Brotherhood, as well as the cover of "Little Bitty Pretty One", while the fourth disc contains previously unreleased recordings of the band dating back as far as to a version of "Long Train Runnin'" from 1970, back when the track was called "Osborn". The fourth disc also includes a previously unreleased 1992 live version of their cover of the Art Reynolds Singers' "Jesus Is Just Alright".

== Release and reception ==
Professional ratings
Review scores
Source	Rating
AllMusic	4/5 stars
The Bellingham Herald	4/4 stars
The Encyclopedia of Popular Music	3/5 stars
The Fresno Bee	B
The Guardian	3/5 stars
The Rolling Stone Album Guide	4/5 stars
San Francisco Chronicle	3/4 stars
Springfield News-Leader	3.5/4 stars
St. Paul Pioneer Press	3/4 stars

In a review for AllMusic, Stephen Thomas Erlewine states that it "is only for hardcore Doobie Brothers fans, since it not only spans 79 tracks, but it also contains a full disc of rarities", he does believe that the first half of the set is a greatest hits collection, as it contains most of the band's hits, but states that "There is some elaboration of these years on disc four, but it takes a while to get there, since disc three chronicles the '80s and beyond", he concludes in his review that "The rarities disc is similarly uneven, but more interesting because much of the music dates from the '70s. Also, the mix of solo songs, alternate mixes, and demos illuminates those classic years somewhat, throwing out a handful of gems along the way. It's a nice bonus for the dedicated, but they really are the only audience for this set." In the Bellingham Herald, Miriam Longino wrote that "this pack is a stream-lined, chronological look at the band", noting that "The extreme dichotomy of the band's sound has never been more apparent than in this package, where the jerky change in musical direction seems to come overnight." Vintage Guitar magazine called it a "A nice set. Recommended for anyone who considers themselves a rock historian or a Doobies fan." In USA Today, Steve Jones said that "These 79 tracks chronicle evolution from upbeat, guitar--driver rockers in the early '70s to a hit-making pop/funk group led by Michael McDonald."

More negatively, the Rolling Stone Album Guide writers Mark Coleman and Byron Coley called it a "definitive, if burdensome, anthology." Similarly, Austin Chronicle writer Greg Beets states that "Instead of four CDs heavy on filler, outtakes, and retreads from the reunited Doobie Brothers (not to mention their grating new version of Thurston Harris' "Little Bitty Pretty One"), Rhino should have pared down the set to two discs and thrown in a video of the What’s Happening! [sic] episode for comic relief. As it is, only the most die-hard of fans — the kind who’d pay $500 for a motorcycle jacket emblazoned with the Doobies’ logo — will want to forgo the existing best-ofs for this perfunctory marathon collection."
