= Running for the Drum =

Studio album by Buffy Sainte-Marie
- Released: September 2008
- Recorded: 2008
- Genre: Folk, rock
- Length: 43:31
- Label: Appleseed
- Producer: Chris Birkett, Buffy Sainte-Marie

Buffy Sainte-Marie chronology
Up Where We Belong (1996)	Running for the Drum (2008)	The Pathfinder: Buried Treasures – The Mid-70's Recordings (2010)

Professional ratings
Review scores
Source	Rating
AllMusic	4/5 stars
The Phoenix	3/4 stars
MusicOMH	3.5/5 stars
Slant	3.5/5 stars

Running for the Drum is the fourteenth studio album by Buffy Sainte-Marie, released in 2008. One of Sainte-Marie's more successful albums, it spawned one single with "No No Keshagesh". Sainte-Marie also rewrote two verses of "America The Beautiful".

== History ==
The album's title comes from a lyric in the song "Cho Cho Fire". Running for the Drum features the DVD documentary on Buffy Sainte-Marie, A Multimedia Life, which features exclusive interviews with artists such as Joni Mitchell and Taj Mahal and performances by Sainte-Marie.

Sessions for this album began in 2006 until 2007, mostly recorded in Sainte-Marie's home recording studio in Hawaii and part in France. The album opens with two aboriginal influenced songs, "No No Keshagesh" (the album's only single and made as if to sound at a rally) and "Cho Cho Fire". Apart from a reworking on the tracks "Little Wheel Spin and Spin" and “Still This Love Goes On”, all of the tracks here are newly written and unique to this album. Running for the Drum won the prestigious Juno Award for Aboriginal Album of the Year. It features her friend, Taj Mahal on acoustic piano.

In 2025, after the revocation of Sainte-Marie's membership in the Order of Canada on the grounds that the questions about her indigenous status meant that she could no longer provide satisfactory proof of Canadian citizenship at all, the album's Juno Award was revoked.

== Track listing ==
All tracks written by Buffy Sainte-Marie except where noted.

1. "No No Keshagesh" – 4:44
2. "Cho Cho Fire" – 3:05
3. "Working For The Government" – 3:33
4. "Little Wheel Spin and Spin" – 3:05
5. "Too Much Is Never Enough" – 3:58
6. "To The Ends of the World" – 3:45
7. "When I Had You" – 4:12
8. "I Bet My Heart On You" – 3:26
9. "Blue Sunday" – 2:55
10. "Easy Like The Snow Falls Down" – 3:52
11. "America the Beautiful" – 3:01 (Katharine Lee Bates, Samuel A. Ward, Sainte-Marie)
12. "Still This Love Goes On" – 3:55

== Personnel ==
- Buffy Sainte-Marie – vocals, guitars, keyboards, piano, percussion and drum samples
- Taj Mahal – acoustic piano on "I Bet My Heart On You"
- Black Lodge Singers – pow wow sample on "Cho Cho Fire"
- Whitefish Jrs. – pow wow sample on "Working For The Government"
- Chris Birkett – guitars, bass, drums, programming, percussion, keyboards, Tibetan bowl and string arrangements
- Monte Horton – electric guitar
- Kirk Smart – lap steel guitar
- Pat Cockett – slack key guitar
- Nico Mirande – bass
- Neil Chapman – bass
- Cyril Diet – drums
- Adrian Fiorelli – drums
- Kevan McKenzie – drums
- Jim Birkett – drum programming, sound effects
- Roger Jacobs – drum loop and programming

Production

- Producer: Chris Birkett and Buffy Sainte-Marie
- Engineer: Chris Birkett and Steve Payne
- Mixing: Buffy Sainte-Marie and Chris Birkett
- Mastering: Seth Foster
- Design: Buffy Sainte-Marie and Patrick Duffy for Attention
- Photography: Trevor Brady, Denise Grant, Brian Geltner, Emerson & Lowe, D. Boy, Norman Seefe, NASA, ESA and A. Nota
