= Power in the Blood (Buffy Sainte-Marie album) =

Studio album by Buffy Sainte-Marie
- Released: May 12, 2015
- Genres: Folk, Rock, First Nations music
- Label: True North
- Producers: Michael Phillip Wojewoda, Chris Birkett, Jon Levine

Buffy Sainte-Marie chronology
The Pathfinder: Buried Treasures – The Mid-70's Recordings (2010)	Power in the Blood (2015)	Medicine Songs (2017)

Power in the Blood is the fifteenth studio album by Buffy Sainte-Marie, released May 12, 2015, on True North Records.

The album includes both new material and contemporary re-recordings of some of her older songs. The title track is a cover of Alabama 3's song "Power in the Blood", from their 2002 album Power in the Blood.

== Reception ==
In a review of the album for NPR, critic Ann Powers wrote that "those who know her mostly by reputation as a standout of the early '60s folk revival will be delighted to discover an artist who's more Bjork than Baez, more Kate Bush than Laurel Canyon. Sainte-Marie is a risk-taker, always chasing new sounds, and a plain talker when it comes to love and politics."

The Canadian music magazine Exclaim! also praised the album, with Stuart Henderson writing that "in fact, Power In The Blood might just be the best album she's made since the late 1960s."

== Awards ==
It won the 2015 Polaris Music Prize on September 21, 2015.

Sainte-Marie won the Americana Music Award for Free Speech at their 2015 ceremony.

At the Juno Awards of 2016, the album won both Aboriginal Album of the Year and Contemporary Roots Album of the Year, and Sainte-Marie was nominated for Songwriter of the Year for "Farm in the Middle of Nowhere", "Ke Sakihitin Awasis (I Love You Baby)" and "Love Charms (Mojo Bijoux)".

In March 2025, after the controversy around Sainte-Marie's long-claimed indigenous Canadian heritage, both the album's Juno and Polaris awards were revoked.

== Track listing ==
1. "It's My Way" (3:55)
2. "Power in the Blood" (4:03)
3. "We Are Circling" (3:04)
4. "Not the Lovin' Kind" (4:11)
5. "Love Charms (Mojo Bijoux)" (4:06)
6. "Ke Sakihitin Awasis (I Love You Baby)" (4:08)
7. "Farm in the Middle of Nowhere" (2:43)
8. "Generation" (3:54)
9. "Sing Our Own Song" (4:52)
10. "Orion" (3:00)
11. "The Uranium War" (3:33)
12. "Carry It On" (3:01)
