= Changing Woman (album) =

Studio album by Buffy Sainte-Marie
- Released: February 1975
- Recorded: 1974
- Genre: Folk
- Length: 30:39
- Label: MCA
- Producer: Norbert Putnam

Buffy Sainte-Marie chronology
| Buffy (1974) | Changing Woman (1975) | Sweet America (1976) |

Professional ratings
Review scores
| Source | Rating |
|---|---|
| The Encyclopedia of Popular Music | 2/5 stars |
| MusicHound Folk: The Essential Album Guide | 2.5/5 stars |

Changing Woman is an album by Buffy Sainte-Marie, released in 1975 via MCA Records. It was her second, and last, album for the label.

== Critical reception ==
Record Collector wrote that the album recalled Sainte-Marie's Vanguard years, and praised Norbert Putnam's "more adventurous arrangements and production."

== Track listing ==
All songs written by Buffy Sainte-Marie except where noted.

1. "Eagle Man/Changing Woman" – 3:08
2. "Can't You See The Way I Love You" – 3:00
3. "Love's Got to Breathe and Fly" – 2:50
4. "You Take Me Away" – 3:14
5. "'Til I See You Again" – 3:08
6. "Mongrel Pup" – 3:19
7. "The Beauty Way" – 2:15
8. "Nobody Will Ever Know It's Real But You" (Norbert Putnam, Buffy Sainte-Marie) – 3:01
9. "All Around The World" – 3:46
10. "A Man" – 2:58
