= The Wakefield Daily Item =

US newspaper

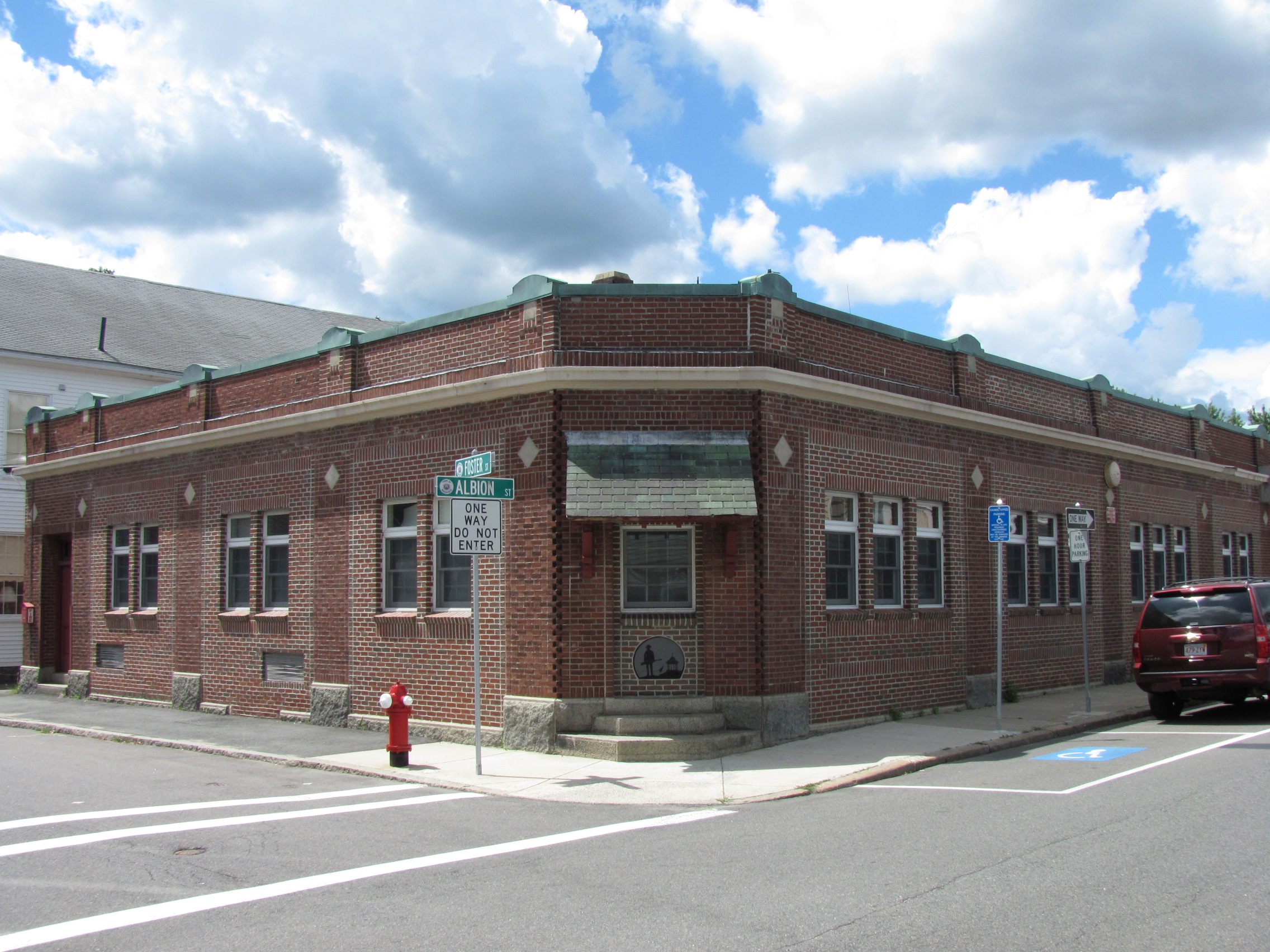
- Headquarters, Item Building (Wakefield, Massachusetts)
- Type: Daily newspaper
- Format: Tabloid
- Owner: The Wakefield Item Co.
- Publisher: Glenn D. Dolbeare
- Editor: Robert Burgess
- Founded: May 7, 1894
- Headquarters: 26 Albion Street, Wakefield, Massachusetts 01880 United States
- Circulation: approximately 4,800 daily
- Price: USD .50 daily
- Website: wakefielditem.com

The Wakefield Daily Item is an American independent weekday daily newspaper published in Wakefield, Massachusetts, with issues published Mondays to Fridays. The Item is located at 26 Albion Street in the town center.

== History ==
Fred W. Young printed the first Item on May 7, 1894, running the paper until selling to printer Alstead W. Browne in March 1900; he sold out to Harris M. Dolbeare, who established the Wakefield Item Company April 1, 1900.

The Item is famous for the "Looking Backward" column, detailing events that took place in Wakefield and around the country 25, 50, 75, and 100 years ago from the date of the newspaper.

The Item's presidents have all been Dolbeare's heirs—his widow Emma Dolbeare, sons Cyrus and Richard Dolbeare, and now grandson Glenn Dolbeare. The paper has had seven editors: Harris Dolbeare (1900–his death in 1938), Gardner Campbell (1938–1953), Robert C. Reed (1953–1966), Kendall Dolbeare (1966–1986), Janet Constantakes (1986–1988) and Peter Rossi (since 1988).

The newspaper competes for readers in Wakefield with a local edition of the Daily Times Chronicle, based in nearby Woburn and Reading; and with the Wakefield Observer, a weekly newspaper published at the Beverly office of Community Newspaper Company.

On January 27, 2009, the Item changed its format from broadsheet to tabloid.

== See also ==
- Item Building (Wakefield, Massachusetts)
