= Simon Toulson-Clarke =

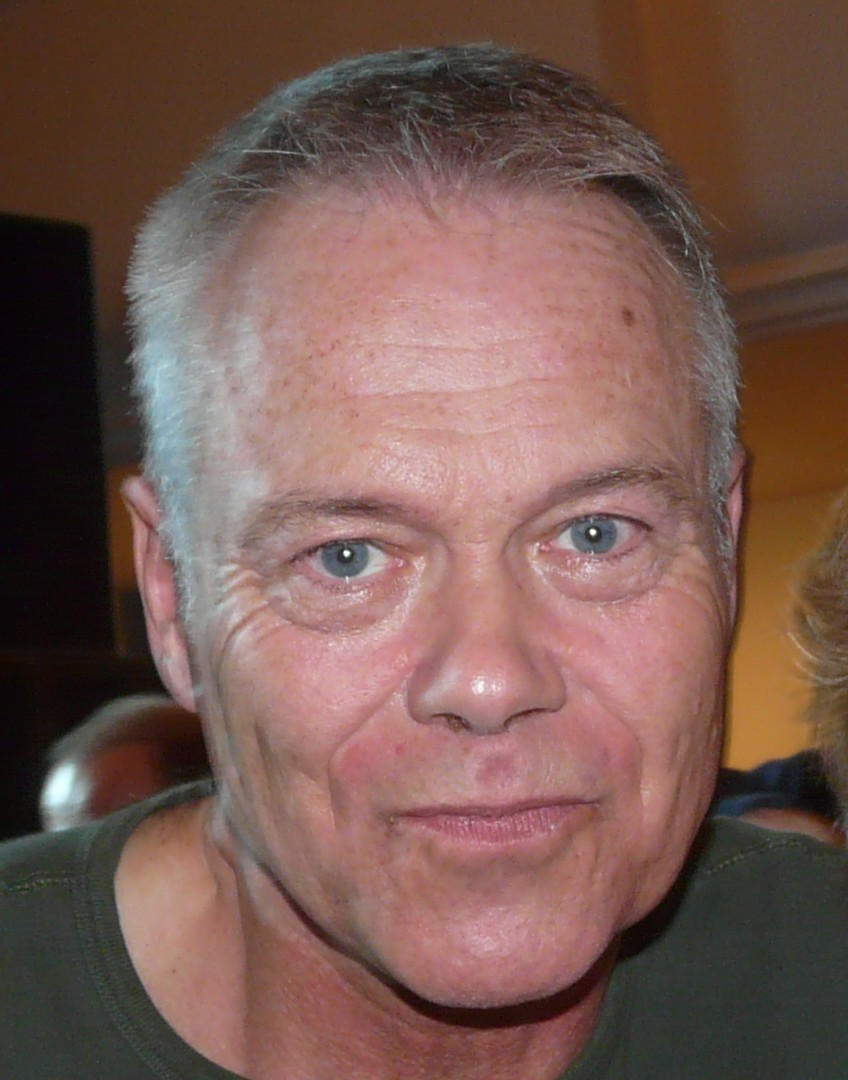
- Simon Toulson-Clarke after a concert in Polanica-Zdrój (Poland), 2014

Background information
- Born: Simon Toulson-Clarke; 4 May 1956 (age 70); Middlesbrough, England
- Origin: Middlesbrough, Teesside, England
- Genres: Pop, new wave
- Member of: Red Box

Simon Toulson-Clarke (born 1956) is the English lead singer and a founder member of the 1980s/1990s pop group Red Box. He was educated at Harrow School and in the late 1970s, he studied in London at the Polytechnic of Central London where he formed the band along with Julian Close, Paddy Talbot, Rob Legge and Martin Nickson.

He released an album in 1997 with Alastair Gavin and Phill Brown titled SPA, which was a tribute to American comic Bill Hicks. In 2010, a third Red Box album was released, titled Plenty.

Simon Toulson-Clarke is recognized for his contributions to the music department of the short film "The Iris Echo" (2018). His songwriting talents are showcased in the Spanish TV series "Abierto por vacaciones" (1993) and the long-running British music show "Top of the Pops" (1964). Additionally, his work is featured in the video "Miguel Bosé - Los vídeos" (2002).
