= Buffy Sainte-Marie =

American musician and activist (born 1941)

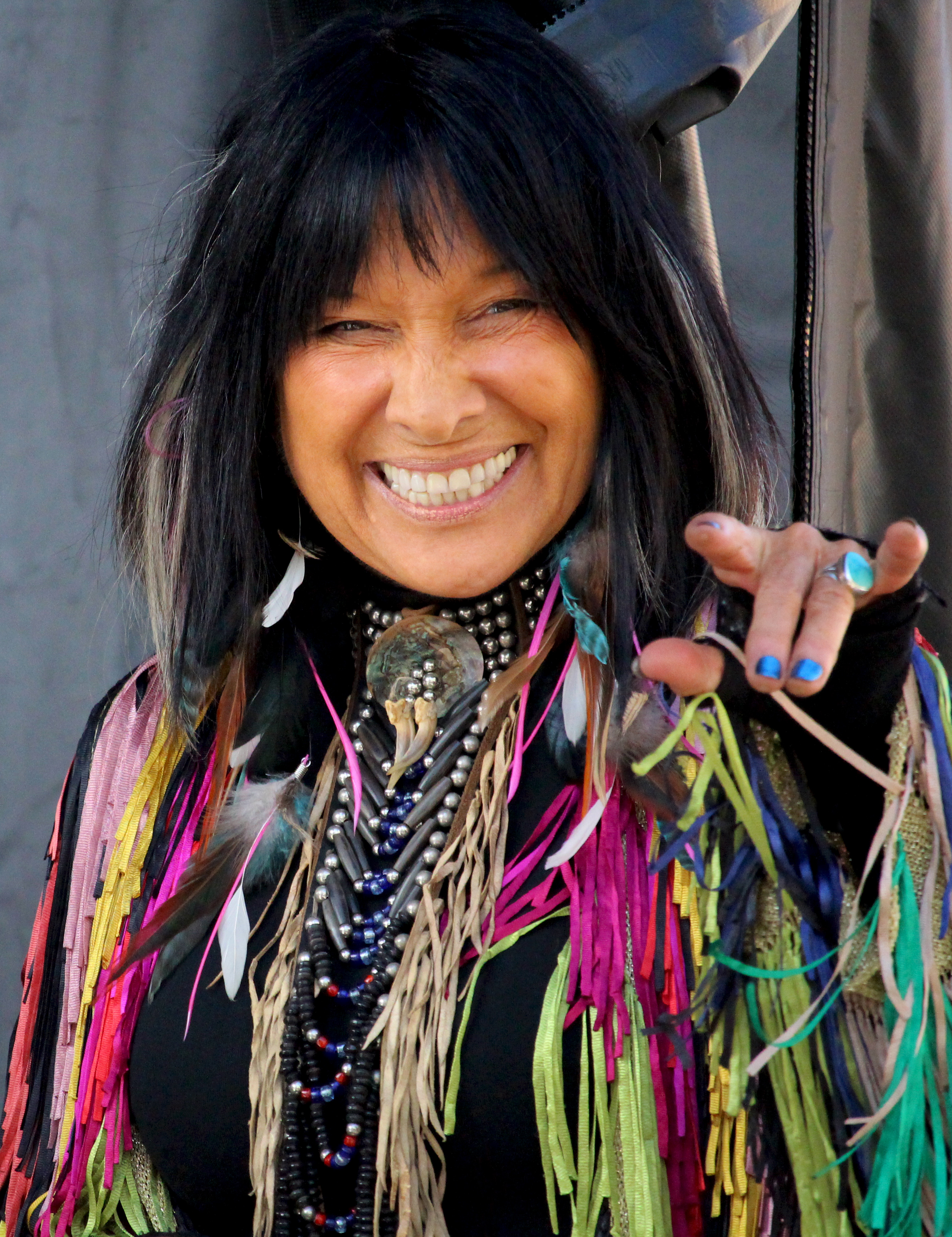
- Sainte-Marie in 2015

Background information
- Born: Beverley Jean Santamaria; February 20, 1941 (age 85); Stoneham, Massachusetts, U.S.
- Genres: Folk; rock
- Occupations: Musician; singer-songwriter; composer; record producer; visual artist; educator; social activist; humanitarian
- Instruments: Vocals; guitar; keyboards
- Years active: 1963–2023 (touring)
- Labels: Vanguard; Angel/EMI; Capitol/EMI; Island; MCA; Appleseed; Ensign/Chrysalis/EMI
- Spouses: Dewain Bugbee (m. 1968; div. 1971) Sheldon Wolfchild (m. 1975, divorced) Jack Nitzsche (m. 1982; div. 1989)
- Website: buffysainte-marie.com
- Children: 1

Buffy Sainte-Marie (born Beverley Jean Santamaria; February 20, 1941) is an American singer-songwriter, musician, and social activist.

Sainte-Marie's singing and writing repertoire includes subjects of love, war, religion, and mysticism, and her work has often focused on issues facing Indigenous peoples of the United States and Canada. She won recognition, awards, and honors for her music as well as her work in education and social activism. In 1983, her song "Up Where We Belong", for An Officer and a Gentleman, won the Academy Award for Best Original Song at the 55th Academy Awards. The song also won the Golden Globe Award for Best Original Song that same year.

From the early 1960s, Sainte-Marie stated she was of Indigenous Canadian ancestry. A 2023 CBC News investigation concluded she was born in the United States and is of Italian and English descent. Some Indigenous musicians and organizations called for awards she won while falsely claiming an Indigenous identity to be rescinded. Many of her awards and honors were subsequently revoked or surrendered due to her lack of Canadian citizenship, including her membership in the Order of Canada, her induction into the Canadian Music Hall of Fame, her Juno Awards, and her Polaris Music Prizes.

== Early life and education ==
Sainte-Marie was born at the New England Sanitarium and Hospital in Stoneham, Massachusetts, to Albert Santamaria and Winifred Irene Santamaria, née Kenrick. The Santamarias were from Wakefield, Massachusetts. Her father's parents were born in Italy while her mother was of English ancestry. Her family changed their surname from Santamaria to the French-sounding "Sainte-Marie" due to anti-Italian sentiment following the Second World War.

Sainte-Marie taught herself to play piano and guitar before attending the University of Massachusetts Amherst.

== Career ==
=== 1960–1978: Rise to prominence ===
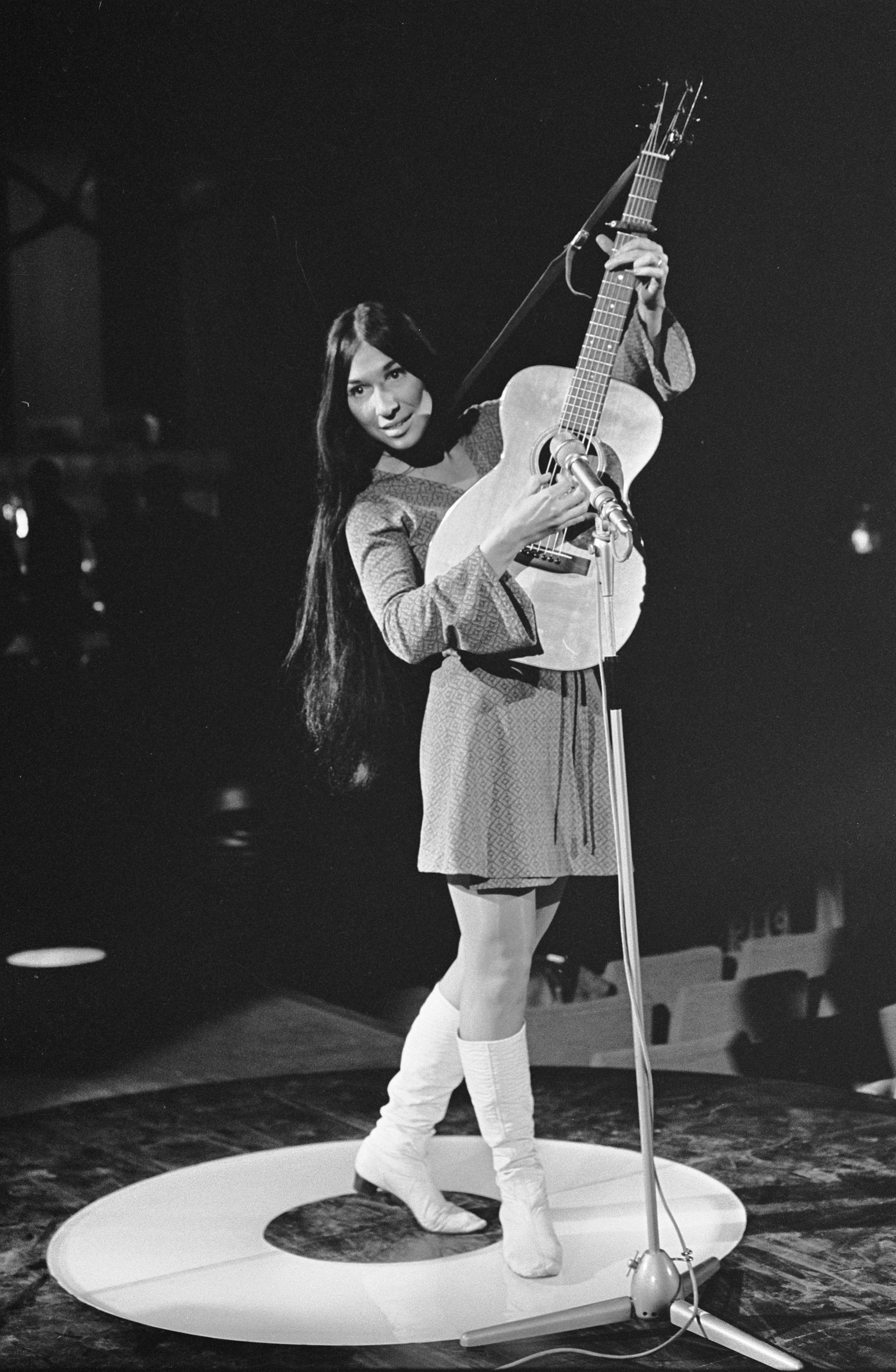
Sainte-Marie performing in the Netherlands in the Grand Gala du Disque Populaire 1968

During the early 1960s, while still in college, her own songs such as "Ananias", the Indian lament "Now That the Buffalo's Gone", and also "Mayoo Sto Hoon" (a Hindi Bollywood song "Mayus To Hoon Waade Se Tere" originally sung by the Indian singer Mohammed Rafi from the 1960 movie Barsaat Ki Raat) were in her repertoire. In her early twenties she toured, developed her craft, and performed in various concert halls, folk music festivals, and First Nations communities across the United States, Canada, and abroad. She spent considerable time in the coffeehouses of Yorkville and Greenwich Village as part of the 1960s folk scene, as did other emerging artists, including Leonard Cohen, Neil Young, Joni Mitchell, and Gordon Lightfoot.

In 1963, while suffering with a throat infection, Sainte-Marie became addicted to codeine, an experience that became the basis for her song "Cod'ine", later recorded by Donovan, Janis Joplin, and many others. That same year, Sainte-Marie witnessed wounded soldiers returning from the Vietnam War when the U.S. government was denying involvement. This inspired the composition of her widely acclaimed protest song "Universal Soldier", released on her debut album It's My Way! on Vanguard Records in 1964. It was later a hit for both Donovan and Glen Campbell.

Her 1965 album Many a Mile included "Until It's Time for You to Go", which has been covered by Neil Diamond, Elvis Presley, Glen Campbell, Barbra Streisand, Andy Williams, and many others.

In 1965, Billboard named Sainte-Marie "Favorite New Female Vocalist" in the folk genre in a poll of disk jockeys. (Note: Some later sources, including Andrea Warner's authorized biography, report that Billboard named Saint-Marie the "best new artist of 1964", but this award is not present in either the 1964 or 1965 poll. Billboard first issued its Top New Artist category in 1977.) Some of her songs addressing the mistreatment of Native Americans, such as "Now That the Buffalo's Gone" (1964) and "My Country 'Tis of Thy People You're Dying" (1964, included on her 1966 album), were seen as controversial.

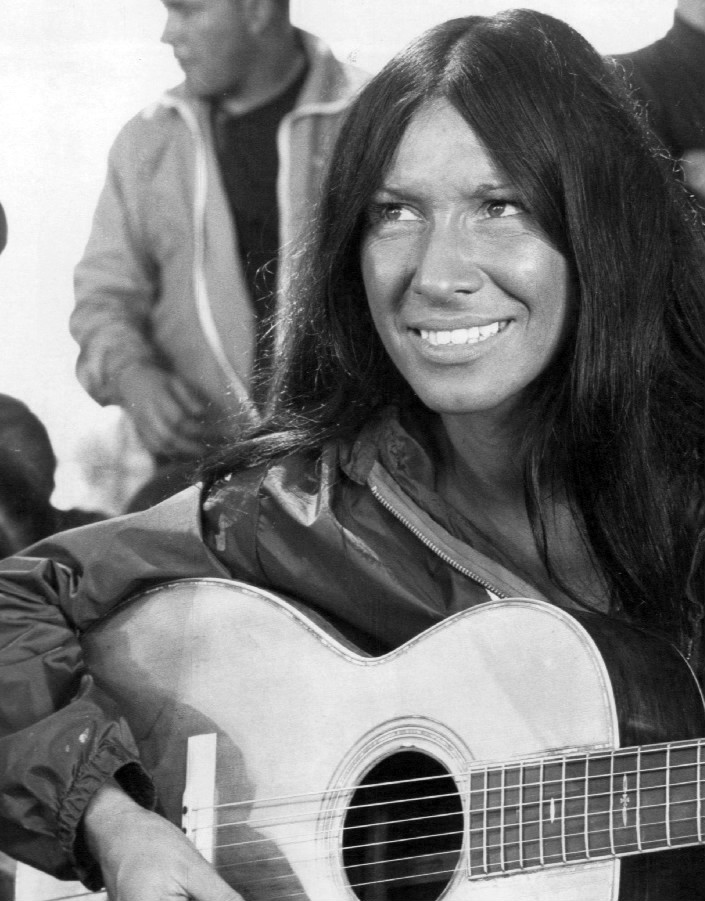
Sainte-Marie in 1970

Sainte-Marie's other well-known songs include "Mister Can't You See" (a Top 40 U.S. hit in 1972); "He's an Indian Cowboy in the Rodeo"; and the theme song of the movie Soldier Blue. In 1969 she released Illuminations, an early quadraphonic album on which she used a synthesizer.

She appeared frequently on television in Canada and the US, including American Bandstand, Soul Train, The Johnny Cash Show, and The Tonight Show Starring Johnny Carson. She guest-starred in "The Heritage" episode of The Virginian in 1968, as a Shoshone woman sent to be educated at school, and acted and sang in "Mating Dance for Tender Grass", a 1970 episode of Then Came Bronson.

=== Sesame Street ===
Sainte-Marie was hired in 1975 to present Native American programming for children for the first time on Sesame Street. Sainte-Marie wanted to teach the show's young viewers that "Indians still exist". She regularly appeared on Sesame Street from 1976 to 1981. Sainte-Marie breastfed her first son, Dakota "Cody" Starblanket Wolfchild in a 1977 episode, which according to Sainte-Marie was the first representation of breastfeeding aired on television. Sesame Street filmed several episodes at her home in Hawaii in 1978.

=== 1979–1999: Established career ===
In 1979, Spirit of the Wind, a docudrama scored by Sainte-Marie, was shown at the Cannes Film Festival. The American Indian Film Festival, which exhibited the film in 1980, recognizes accurate historical and contemporary portrayals of Native Americans.

Sainte-Marie started using Apple II and Macintosh computers in 1981 to record her music.

"Up Where We Belong" (written by Sainte-Marie with Will Jennings and Jack Nitzsche) was performed by Joe Cocker and Jennifer Warnes for An Officer and a Gentleman. It received the Academy Award for Best Original Song in 1982. On January 29, 1983, Jennings, Nitzsche, and Sainte-Marie won the Golden Globe Award for Best Original Song. They also won the BAFTA film award for Best Original Song in 1984. On the Songs of the Century list compiled by the Recording Industry Association of America in 2001, the song was listed at number 323. In 2020, it was included on Billboard magazine's list of the "25 Greatest Love Song Duets". In the early 1980s, one of her songs was used as the theme song for the CBC's Native series Spirit Bay. She was cast for the TNT 1993 telefilm The Broken Chain. In 1989, she wrote and performed the music for Where the Spirit Lives, a film about Native children being abducted, forced into residential schools, and expected to give up their Native way of life.

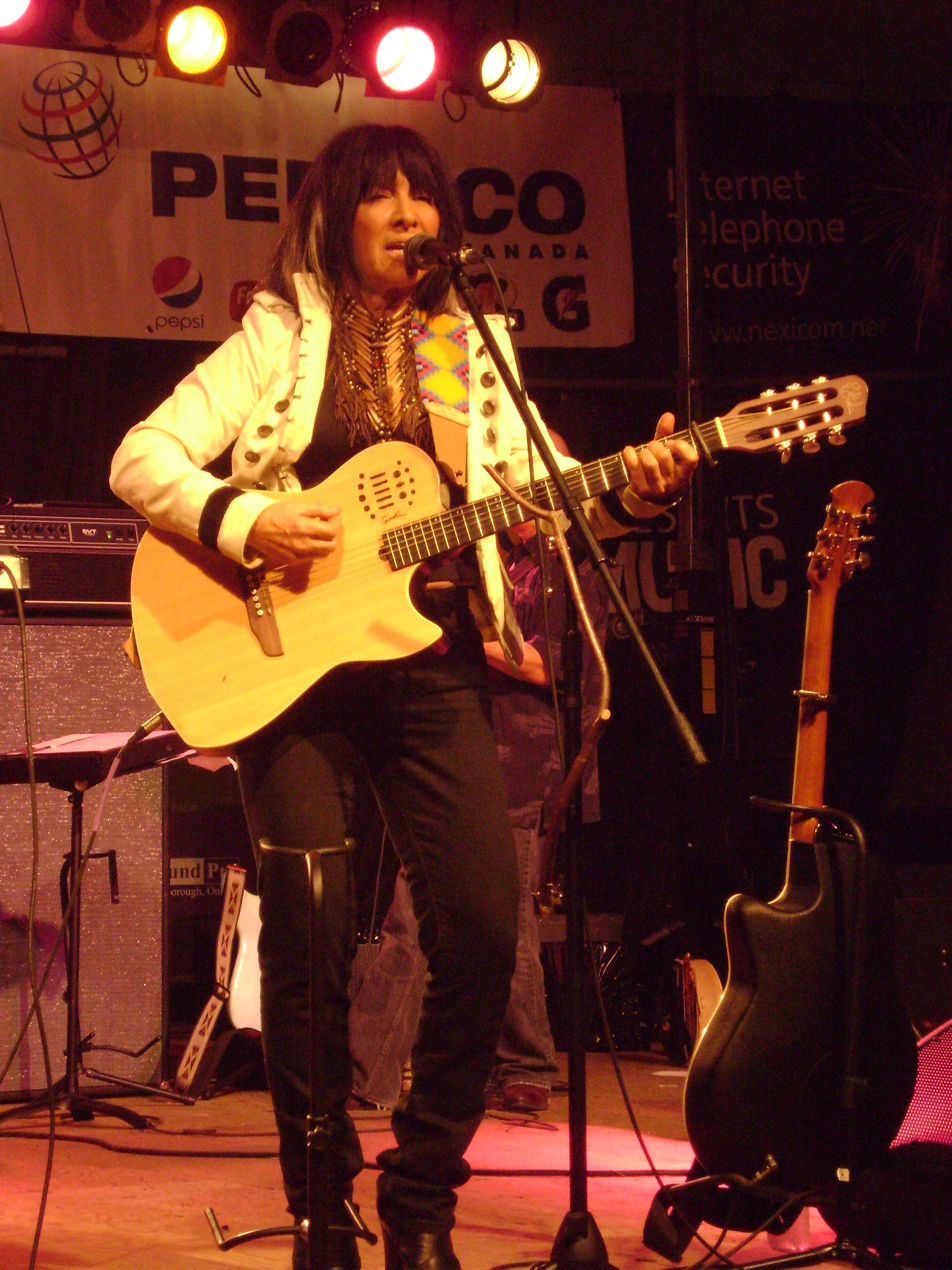
Sainte-Marie playing the Peterborough Summer Festival of Lights on June 24, 2009

Sainte-Marie voiced a Cheyenne character, Kate Bighead, in the 1991 made-for-TV movie Son of the Morning Star, telling the Indian side of the Battle of the Little Bighorn where the Sioux chief, Sitting Bull, defeated Lieutenant Colonel George Custer played by actor Gary Cole. In 1992, after a sixteen-year recording hiatus, Sainte-Marie released Coincidence and Likely Stories. Recorded in 1990 at home in Hawaii on her computer, it included the politically charged songs "The Big Ones Get Away" and "Bury My Heart at Wounded Knee", both comments on the ongoing plight of Native Americans (see also the book and film with the same name). Also in 1992, Sainte-Marie appeared in the television film The Broken Chain with Pierce Brosnan.

Sainte-Marie has exhibited her art at the Glenbow Museum in Calgary, the Winnipeg Art Gallery, the Emily Carr Gallery in Vancouver and the American Indian Arts Museum in Santa Fe, New Mexico. In 1995, she provided the voice of the spirit in the magic mirror in HBO's Happily Ever After: Fairy Tales for Every Child, which featured a Native American retelling of the Snow White fairy tale. Also in 1995, the Indigo Girls released two versions of Sainte-Marie's protest song "Bury My Heart at Wounded Knee" on their album 1200 Curfews.

In 1996, she started the Nihewan Foundation, a philanthropic non-profit fund for American Indian Education devoted to improving Native American students' participation in learning. A Cree word, "nihewan", literally "talk Cree", in this context means "be your culture". Sainte-Marie founded the Cradleboard Teaching Project in 1996 using funds from her Nihewan Foundation and a two-year grant from the W. K. Kellogg Foundation with projects across Mohawk, Cree, Ojibwe, Menominee, Coeur d'Alene, Navajo, Quinault, Hawaiian, and Apache communities in eleven states, partnered with a non-Native class of the same grade level for Elementary, Middle, and High School grades in the disciplines of Geography, History, Social Studies, Music, and Science, and produced a multimedia curriculum CD, Science: Through Native American Eyes.

=== 2000–2023: Later work ===
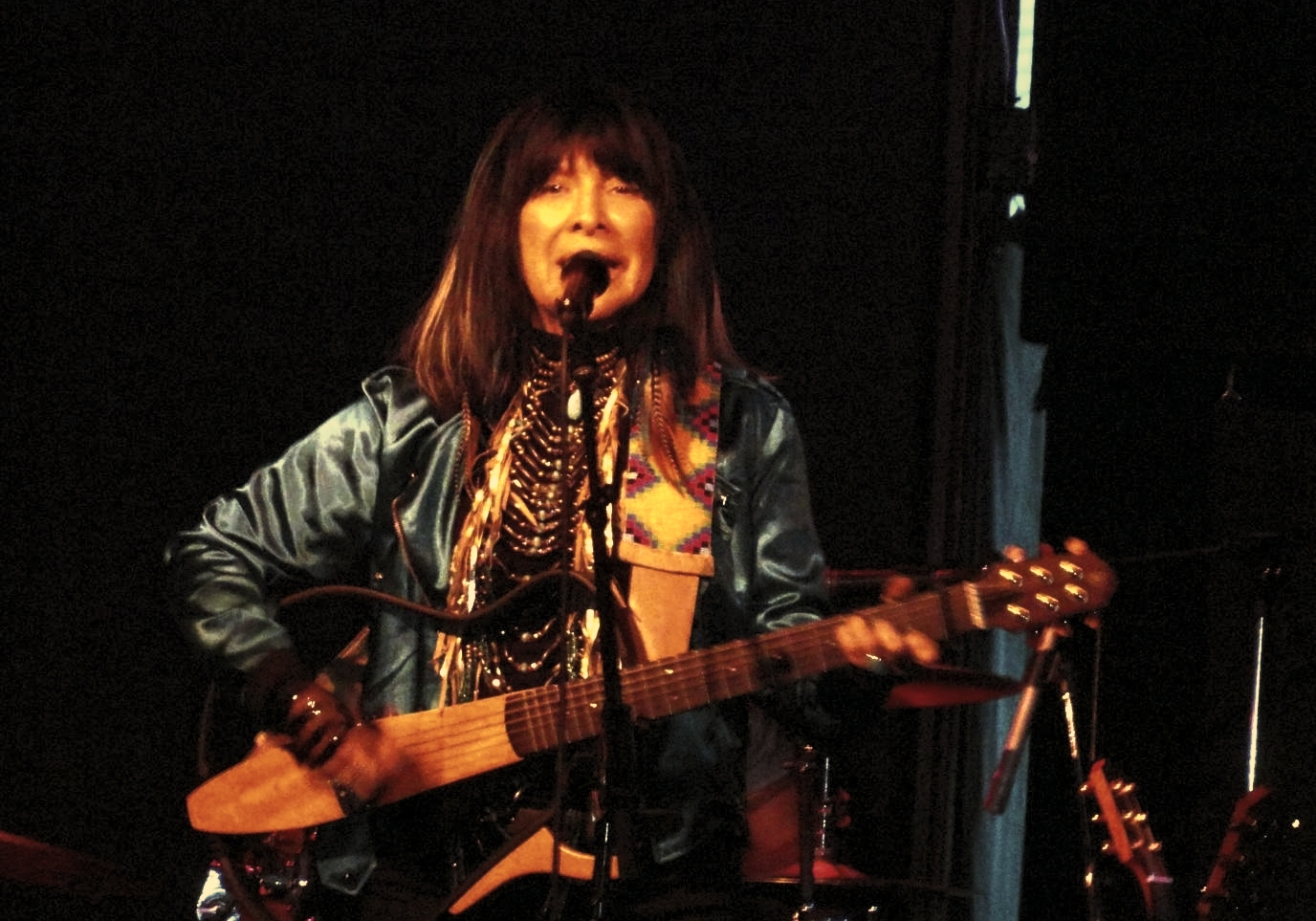
Sainte-Marie performing at The Iron Horse in Northampton, Massachusetts, June 2013

In 2000, Sainte-Marie gave the commencement address at Haskell Indian Nations University. In 2002 she sang at the Kennedy Space Center for Commander John Herrington, USN, a Chickasaw and the first Native American astronaut. In 2003 she became a spokesperson for the UNESCO Associated Schools Project Network in Canada. In 2002, a track written and performed by Sainte-Marie, titled "Lazarus", was sampled by Kanye West and performed by Cam'Ron and Jim Jones of The Diplomats under the title "Dead or Alive".

In 2008, a two-CD set titled Buffy/Changing Woman/Sweet America: The Mid-1970s Recordings was released, compiling the three studio albums that she recorded for ABC and MCA between 1974 and 1976 after departing Vanguard. In 2015, Sainte-Marie released Power in the Blood and appeared on Democracy Now! to discuss the record and her musical and activist career. Power in the Blood won the 2015 Polaris Music Prize. That same year, A Tribe Called Red released an electronic remix of Sainte-Marie's "Working for the Government".

Sainte-Marie was the subject of a 2022 documentary, Buffy Sainte-Marie: Carry It On. In the same year the National Arts Centre staged Buffy Sainte-Marie: Starwalker, a tribute concert of Sainte-Marie's songs.

== Personal life ==
In 1964, while on a trip to the Piapot Cree reserve in southern Saskatchewan for a powwow, she was adopted by the youngest son of Chief Piapot, Emile Piapot, and his wife, Clara Starblanket Piapot, in accordance with Cree Nation tradition.

In 1970, she founded the Native North American Women's Association whose aim was "to call attention to the injustices done to Indian women" adding that "I think we are worse off than any other minority group".

Although not an adherent, Sainte-Marie became an active friend of the Bahá'í faith, appearing at concerts for and conferences and conventions surrounding the religion. In 1992, she appeared in the musical event prelude to the Baháʼí World Congress, a double concert, "Live Unity: The Sound of the World" (1992) with video broadcast and documentary. In the video documentary of the event Sainte-Marie is seen on the Dini Petty Show explaining the Bahá'í teaching of progressive revelation. "I gave a lot of support to Bahá'í people in the '80s and '90s ... Bahá'í people, as people of all religions, is something I'm attracted to ... I don't belong to any religion. ... I have a huge religious faith or spiritual faith but I feel as though religion ... is the first thing that racketeers exploit. ... But that doesn't turn me against religion ..."

Sainte-Marie applied for Canadian citizenship through her Cree lawyer, Delia Opekokew, in 1980. In 2017, she stated that she does not have a Canadian passport and is a US citizen.

In 1968, Sainte-Marie married a surfing instructor, Dewain Bugbee, but later divorced. She then married Sheldon Wolfchild with whom she had a son. She was married to her co-writer on "Up Where We Belong", Jack Nitzsche, during most of the 1980s.

== Indigenous identity claims and retirement ==
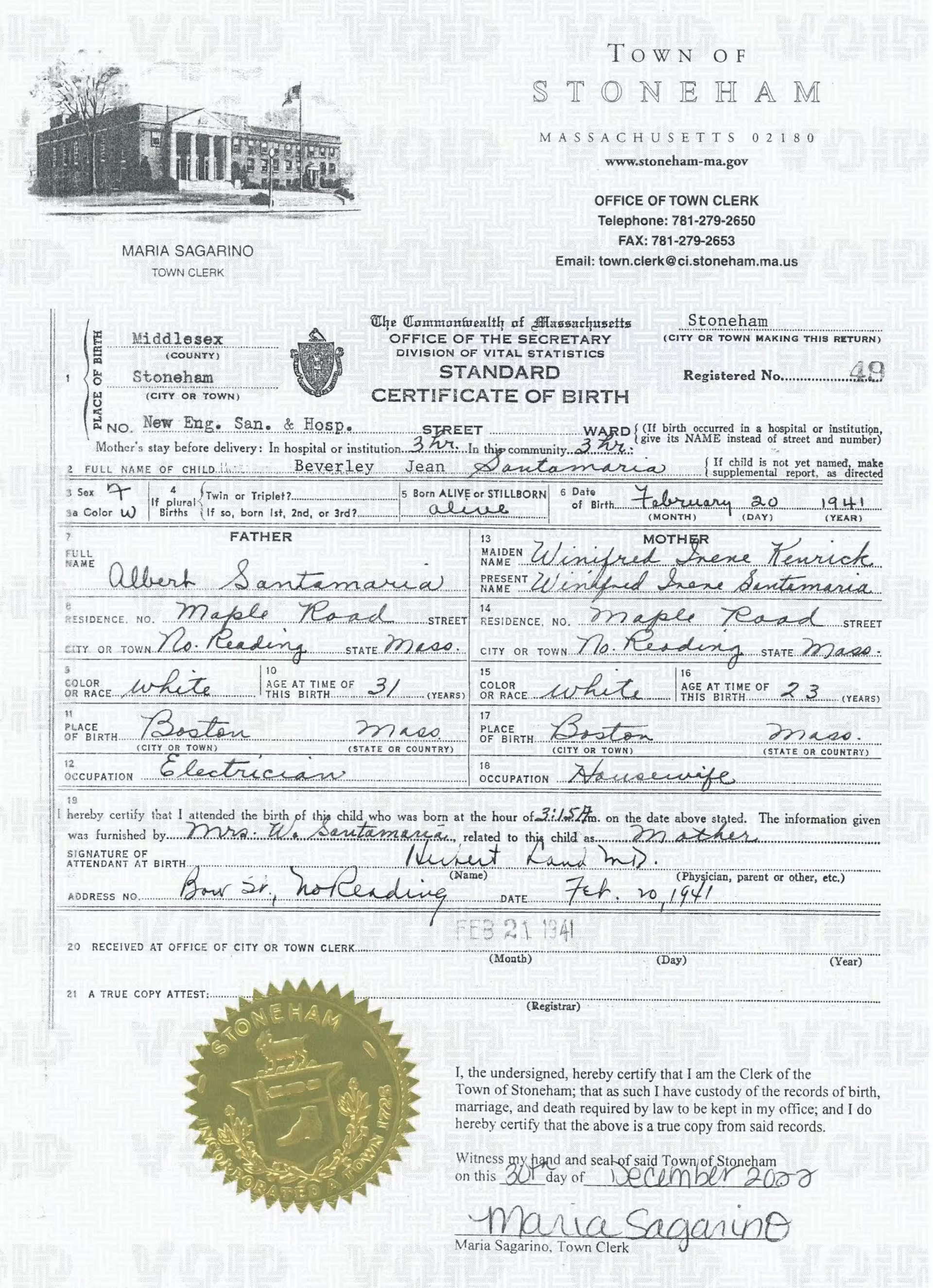
Copy of Sainte-Marie's birth certificate issued by the town of Stoneham, Massachusetts, U.S.

Sainte-Marie's 2018 authorized biography stated she was "probably born" on the Piapot 75 reserve in the Qu'Appelle Valley, Saskatchewan. She also wrote that, at the age of two or three, she was taken from her Cree parents as part of the Sixties Scoop, a government policy started in 1951 (at which time she was in fact ten years old in Massachusetts, not two or three years old in Saskatchewan), in which Indigenous children were removed from their families, communities, and cultures, and placed with families not of First Nations heritage.

=== Career under Indigenous identity ===
Throughout her career, Sainte-Marie claimed she was adopted and either had no knowledge or was uncertain about her birthplace or biological parents.

From the start, newspapers referred to her as Algonquin, full-blooded Algonquin, Mi'kmaq, or half-Mi'kmaq. For example, a concert review in The Oshawa Times in October 1964 described her as "full-blooded Cree" going on to state that "Buffy (it used to be Beverly) Sainte Marie was born in Craven, Sask., near Regina, and while still a baby was adopted by a part-white, part-Micmac Indian family and raised in Massachusetts." An article about Sainte-Marie published in The Canadian Statesman in 1995 included biographical information which stated: "Born to Cree Indian parents on the Piapot Reserve in Saskatchewan, [she] was orphaned when she was only a few months old. Her adoptive parents moved her to Massachusetts."

Sainte-Marie said she had community ties to the Piapot First Nation and cited her adoption as an adult by Chief Emile Piapot and Clara Starblanket. Emile's great-granddaughter Ntawnis Piapot corroborated this, saying Sainte-Marie was adopted according to traditional Cree customs over "days and months and years".

Members of the Sainte-Marie family attempted to clarify her ancestry in the 1960s and 1970s. In 1964, Arthur Santamaria, Sainte-Marie's uncle, wrote in the Wakefield Daily Item that Sainte-Marie "has no Indian blood" and "not a bit" of Cree heritage. Her brother, Alan Sainte-Marie, told newspapers, including the Denver Post in 1972, that his sister was not born on a reservation but was the child of Caucasian parents, and that "to associate her with the Indian and to accept her as his spokesman is wrong".

Alan Sainte-Marie's daughter Heidi stated that when Buffy and her father met with a producer for Sesame Street, the producer asked Alan whether he was Indigenous. Alan Sainte-Marie replied that they were all of European ancestry. On November 7, 1975, Alan Sainte-Marie received a letter from a law firm representing his sister that read: "We have been advised that you have without provocation disparaged and perhaps defamed Buffy and maliciously interfered with her employment opportunities." The letter went on to make clear that no expense would be spared in pursuing legal remedies. Included was a handwritten note from Buffy Sainte-Marie to her brother threatening to publicly accuse him of sexually abusing her as a child if he spoke further about her ancestry. She made her first appearance on Sesame Street one month later.

=== Investigation of claims and retirement ===
In 2023, the CBC's The Fifth Estate investigated Sainte-Marie's purported origins. Two months before the show aired, Sainte-Marie announced her retirement from live performances, citing health concerns. Descendants of Piapot and Starblanket defended her in advance of the broadcast, stating: "We claim her as a member of our family and all of our family members are from the Piapot First Nation. To us, that holds far more weight than any paper documentation or colonial record keeping ever could." Their statement additionally characterized the allegations against Sainte-Marie as "hurtful, ignorant, colonial, and racist".

On October 27, 2023, The Fifth Estate demonstrated that Sainte-Marie's claims of Indigenous ancestry were false. The first mention of her being Cree came when the Vancouver Sun described Sainte-Marie as a "Cree Indian" in 1963. The Fifth Estate tracked down her birth certificate, which lists her as white and demonstrates that her parents, who Sainte-Marie had claimed adopted her, were her birth parents. She was born in Stoneham, Massachusetts, to Albert and Winifred Santamaria. Her son additionally confirmed that she obtained her public identity through "naturalization", not by birth, and her younger sister took a DNA test. The results showed that she is genetically related to Sainte-Marie's son, proving that Sainte-Marie was her biological sibling, and that there was only distant Indigenous ancestry in the family's genetic makeup.

Initially, the acting chief of the Piapot First Nation, Ira Lavallee, said that this information did not preclude Sainte-Marie from claiming tribal affiliation, stating: "We do have one of our families in our community that did adopt her. Regardless of her ancestry, that adoption in our culture to us is legitimate." A writer from The Walrus criticized how CBC handled the investigation and found it "puzzling" why it left out information about Delia Opekokew, the Cree lawyer hired to determine Sainte-Marie's right to Canadian citizenship, who had looked at the American birth certificate, and determined that it was not an accurate representation of her identity. The writer also mentioned that it was unusual that her biological American parents happened to be on a Saskatchewan reserve shortly after her birth, and that omitting "the Cree perspective leaves the viewer without any context of Cree law, adoption, or kinship".

Sainte-Marie released a video statement addressing the allegations after Buffy Sainte-Marie: Carry It On won at the International Emmy Awards. In response, she said: "My mother told me that I was adopted and that I was Native, but there was no documentation as was common for Indigenous children at the time", adding that "I don't know where I'm from or who my birth parents are, and I will never know." She also claimed: "I have never known if my birth certificate was real."

=== Reactions and rescinded awards ===
Later in November 2023, Sainte-Marie deleted from her website any claim of Cree heritage or of being born on Piapot First Nation. Lavallee then called for her to take a DNA test, saying: "That's something that anyone in my community can do and would not have fear of doing because we know who we are and what we are, and it's easily provable through a DNA test. If Buffy did that, that's one thing that could clear all this up." Cree author Darrel J. McLeod said that Sainte-Marie is an honorary member of the Piapot family, but that growing up with a white family allowed her to develop her talent and audience from a young age and that she should "apologize, come clean, stop gaslighting us and find a way to make amends".

In March 2025, Sainte-Marie told The Canadian Press that she returned her Order of Canada "with a good heart" and asserted that she had never lied about her identity. She claimed to have "made it completely clear" she was not Canadian to Rideau Hall, as well as to former prime minister Pierre Trudeau when he invited her to perform for Queen Elizabeth II in 1977. In the days that followed, her five Juno awards were revoked, along with other honors, including the Polaris Music Prize and her induction into the Canadian Music Hall of Fame. The Canadian Academy of Recording Arts and Sciences, which administers both the Juno Awards and the Canadian Music Hall of Fame, said that Sainte-Marie did not meet its eligibility criteria, while the organizers of the Polaris Music Prize said that it required all its nominees to be Canadian citizens or permanent residents.

== Honors and awards ==
=== Honorary degrees ===
Sainte-Marie has been awarded 15 honorary doctorates. With regard to the University of Massachusetts, her website states that she was awarded an "Honorary Doctor of Fine Arts" in 1983. However, in an interview published in 2009, she stated that "I also got a teaching degree from the University of Massachusetts and later, a PhD in fine arts".

University	Title	Year awarded	Note
University of Regina	Honorary Doctor of Laws	1996	
Lakehead University	Honorary Doctor of Letters	2000	Revoked 2025
University of Saskatchewan	Honorary Doctor of Humanities	2003	
Emily Carr Institute of Art and Design	Honorary Doctor of Letters	2007	
Carleton University	Honorary Doctor of Laws	2008	
University of Western Ontario	Honorary Doctor of Music	2009	
Ontario College of Art and Design	Honorary Doctor of Fine Arts	2010	
Brandon University	Honorary Doctor of Music	2010	
Wilfrid Laurier University	Honorary Doctor of Letters	2010	
University of British Columbia	Honorary Doctor of Letters	2012	
Vancouver Island University	Honorary Doctor of Laws	2016	
University of Lethbridge	Honorary Doctor of Laws	2017	
Dalhousie University	Honorary Doctor of Laws	2018	Revoked 2026
University of Toronto	Honorary Doctor of Laws	2019	Revoked 2026

=== Personal awards ===
Award	Year Awarded	Status	Note
Queen Elizabeth II Golden Jubilee Medal	2002	Revoked 2025	
Queen Elizabeth II Diamond Jubilee Medal	2012	Revoked 2025	
Juno Humanitarian Award	2017	Revoked 2025	Awarded as Allan Waters Humanitarian Award
Companion of the Order of Canada	2019	Terminated 2025	Promotion from Officer in 1997
PARO Inaugural Women Voice Award	2019		
Canadian Music Week; Allan Slaight Humanitarian Spirit Award	2020		
TIFF Jeff Skoll Award in Impact Media	2022		

=== Performance awards ===
Award	Year Awarded	Status	Note
Academy Award for Best Original Song for "Up Where We Belong"	1983		Joint winner with Jack Nitzsche and Will Jennings
Canadian Music Hall of Fame Inductee	1995	Revoked 2025	
Canadian Aboriginal Music Awards; Lifetime Achievement Award	2008		Awards now known as Indigenous Music Awards
Governor General's Performing Arts Award	2010	Revoked 2025	
Polaris Music Prize	2015	Revoked 2025	for Power in the Blood
Juno Award for Indigenous Music Album of the Year	2018	Revoked 2025	for Medicine Songs
Indigenous Music Awards for Best Folk Album	2018		for Medicine Songs
Canadian Songwriters Hall of Fame Inductee	2019	Revoked 2025	
Polaris Heritage Prize for It's My Way!	2020	Revoked 2025	

=== Other ===
- In 1979, the Supersisters trading card set was produced and distributed; one of the cards featured Sainte-Marie's name and picture.
- Canada Post stamp of Sainte-Marie in 2021

=== Award-related reactions following ancestry controversy ===
After Sainte-Marie's claims to an Indigenous identity were disproven by The Fifth Estate, there were calls to rescind awards given her that were meant for Indigenous persons. Issiqut Anguk, sister of singer Kelly Fraser who lost the 2018 Juno Award for Indigenous Music Album of the Year to Sainte-Marie (and who died by suicide the following year), wrote that Fraser "respected Buffy so much and it hurts to hear that maybe, just maybe it would've changed Kelly's life if she won the Juno award and Buffy didn't." The Indigenous Women's Collective expressed dismay at Sainte-Marie's winning an International Emmy Award for Buffy Sainte-Marie: Carry It On and asked the Junos to revisit the 2018 awards to "explore ways of righting a past wrong. All Indigenous artists in this 2018 category should be reconsidered for this rightful honour." Tim Johnson, former associate director of the National Museum of the American Indian, said her Junos should be rescinded and the Indigenous musicians who lost to her should be considered her victims. Rhonda Head, an award-winning opera singer from the Opaskwayak Cree Nation says, "She won awards that were an accolade, that were meant for Indigenous musicians and that's what really hurts me the most. I would like to see that her awards be taken away forever, for her not being truthful and taking up space."

==== Rescinded awards ====
On February 7, 2025, the Government of Canada announced that Sainte-Marie was removed from the Order of Canada as of January 3, 2025. In March 2025, Sainte-Marie's Governor General's Performing Arts Award, Polaris Music Prizes, Juno Awards, and Canadian Music Hall of Fame induction were rescinded because she is not Canadian.

On January 21, 2026, CBC reported that Dalhousie University in Halifax had revoked the honorary degree it bestowed upon Sainte-Marie in 2018.

On May 14, 2026, CBC reported that the University of Toronto had rescinded Sainte-Marie’s honorary Doctor of Laws degree following a petition to revoke the honor.

== Discography ==
=== Albums ===
List of albums, with selected chart positions
Year	Album	Peak chart positions			
Year	Album	CAN	AUS	UK	US
1964	It's My Way!	—	—N/a	—	—
1965	Many a Mile	—	—N/a	—	—
1966	Little Wheel Spin and Spin	—	—N/a	—	97
1967	Fire & Fleet & Candlelight	—	—N/a	—	126
1968	I'm Gonna Be a Country Girl Again	—	—N/a	—	171
1969	Illuminations	—	—	—	—
1971	She Used to Wanna Be a Ballerina	—	47	—	182
1972	Moonshot	—	—	—	134
1973	Quiet Places	—	—	—	—
1974	Buffy	—	—	—	—
1975	Changing Woman	—	—	—	—
1976	Sweet America	—	—	—	—
1992	Coincidence and Likely Stories	63	—	39	—
1996	Up Where We Belong	—	—	—	—
2008	Running for the Drum	—	—	—	—
2015	Power in the Blood	—	—	—	—
2017	Medicine Songs	—	—	—	—

List of collaboration albums
Year	Album
1985	Attla: A Motion Picture Soundtrack Album (with William Ackerman)

=== Compilation albums ===
List of compilation albums
Year	Album	Peak chart positions
Year	Album	US
1970	The Best of Buffy Sainte-Marie	142
1971	The Best of Buffy Sainte-Marie Vol. 2	—
1974	Native North American Child: An Odyssey	—
1976	Indian Girl (European release)	—
1976	A Golden Hour of the Best Of (UK release)	—
2003	The Best of the Vanguard Years	—
2008	Buffy/Changing Woman/Sweet America	—
2010	The Pathfinder: Buried Treasures – The Mid-70's Recordings	—

=== Singles ===
List of singles, with selected chart positions
Year	Single	Peak chart positions					Album
Year	Single	CAN	CAN AC	AUS	UK	US	Album
1965	"Until It's Time for You to Go"	—	—	—	—	—	Many a Mile
1970	"The Circle Game"	76	—	83	—	109	Fire & Fleet & Candlelight
1971	"Soldier Blue"	—	—	—	7	—	She Used to Wanna Be a Ballerina
1971	"I'm Gonna Be a Country Girl Again"	86	—	—	34	98	I'm Gonna Be a Country Girl Again
1972	"Mister Can't You See"	21	—	70	—	38	Moonshot
1972	"He's an Indian Cowboy in the Rodeo"	—	—	—	—	98	Moonshot
1973	"I Wanna Hold Your Hand Forever"	—	—	—	—	—	N/A
1974	"Waves"	—	27	—	—	—	Buffy
1992	"The Big Ones Get Away"	24	14	—	39	—	Coincidence & Likely Stories
1992	"Fallen Angels"	50	26	—	57	—	Coincidence & Likely Stories
1996	"Until It's Time for You to Go"	—	54	—	—	—	Up Where We Belong
2008	"No No Keshagesh"	—	—	—	—	—	Running for the Drum
2017	"You Got to Run (Spirit of the Wind)" (featuring Tanya Tagaq)	—	—	—	—	—	Medicine Songs

=== Soundtrack appearances ===
Year	Song(s)	Album
1970	"Dyed, Dead, Red" and "Hashishin" with Ry Cooder	Performance
2019	"The Circle Game"	Once Upon A Time In Hollywood

== See also ==
- Music of Canada
- Pretendian
- Carrie Bourassa
- Mary Ellen Turpel-Lafond
- Thomas King (novelist)

== Bibliography ==
- Bataille, Gretchen; Lisa, Laurie (2005). Native American women: a biographical dictionary (eBook : Document : Biography: English : Second ed.). New York : Taylor & Francis e-Library. ISBN 9781135955878. OCLC 909403141.
- British Film Institute (1985), Ellis, Mundy (ed.), BFI Film and Television Yearbook 85, Concert Publications, ISBN 0851701833
- Sheward, David (1997), The Big Book of Show Business Awards, Billboard Books, ISBN 0-8230-7630-X
- Stonechild, Blair (2012). Buffy Sainte-Marie: It's My Way. Fifth House Publishers. ISBN 978-1897252789.
- Warner, Andrea (2018). Buffy Sainte-Marie: The Authorized Biography. Vancouver: Greystone Books. ISBN 978-1-77164-359-7 – via Google Books.
- Whitburn, Joel (2009), Joel Whitburn's Top Pop Singles, 1955–2008, Record Research, ISBN 978-0898201802
