= The Best of Buffy Sainte-Marie =

Greatest hits album by Buffy Sainte-Marie
- Released: 1970
- Recorded: 1964–1969
- Genre: Folk
- Length: 75:31
- Label: Vanguard
- Producer: Maynard Solomon

Professional ratings
Review scores
Source	Rating
AllMusic	4.5/5 stars

The Best of Buffy Sainte-Marie is a compilation album taken from her first six albums with Vanguard Records, released in 1970.

== History ==
Issued as a double-LP set after the financial disaster of Illuminations, the album contains material from all her previous albums but not one track unavailable elsewhere at the time of its release. The compilation was a very modest chart success, returning her to the Top 200 after the failure of Illuminations, from which it does however extract five tracks.

Because Many a Mile has been issued on compact disc only in Italy, and Illuminations and Fire & Fleet & Candlelight were not issued on CD until many years after The Best of Buffy Sainte-Marie became her first-ever release on CD in 1990, the compilation has always been of considerable value despite containing no hits except the extremely minor #98 "I'm Gonna Be a Country Girl Again" (which actually only reached even that position after being re-released after "Soldier Blue"). An abbreviated single-LP version was also released in 1972 with the catalogue number Vanguard 73113.

== Track list ==
All tracks are written by Buffy Sainte-Marie except where noted.

No.	Title	Original album	Length
1.	"Soulful Shade of Blue"	I'm Gonna Be a Country Girl Again	2:14
2.	"Summer Boy"	Fire & Fleet & Candlelight	2:39
3.	"Universal Soldier"	It's My Way!	2:15
4.	"Better to Find Out for Yourself"	Illuminations	2:12
5.	"Cod'ine"	It's My Way!	5:01
6.	"He's a Keeper of the Fire"	Illuminations	2:58
7.	"Take My Hand for a While"	I'm Gonna Be a Country Girl Again	2:30
8.	"Ground Hog" (traditional)	Many a Mile	2:13
9.	"The Circle Game" (Joni Mitchell)	Fire & Fleet & Candlelight	2:51
10.	"My Country 'Tis of Thy People You're Dying"	Little Wheel Spin and Spin	6:49
11.	"Many a Mile" (Patrick Sky)	Many a Mile	2:42
12.	"Until It's Time for You to Go"	Many a Mile	2:27
13.	"Rolling Log Blues"	Little Wheel Spin and Spin	3:28
14.	"God Is Alive, Magic Is Afoot" (poem by Leonard Cohen / music by Buffy Sainte-Marie)	Illuminations	4:46
15.	"Guess Who I Saw in Paris"	Illuminations	2:25
16.	"Piney Wood Hills"	I'm Gonna Be a Country Girl Again	3:04
17.	"Now That the Buffalo's Gone"	It's My Way!	2:45
18.	"Cripple Creek"	It's My Way!	1:45
19.	"I'm Gonna Be a Country Girl Again"	I'm Gonna Be a Country Girl Again	2:57
20.	"The Vampire"	Illuminations	2:05
21.	"Little Wheel Spin and Spin"	Little Wheel Spin and Spin	2:26
22.	"Winter Boy"	Little Wheel Spin and Spin	2:10
23.	"Los Pescadores"	Many a Mile	2:01
24.	"Sometimes When I Get to Thinking"	Little Wheel Spin and Spin	2:59

== Charts ==
Billboard (North America)

Year	Chart	Peak position
1970	Pop Albums	142
