= Cod'ine =

Song by Buffy Sainte-Marie

from the album It's My Way!
- Released: April 1964
- Genre: Folk
- Length: 5:01
- Label: Vanguard
- Songwriter(s): Buffy Sainte-Marie
- Producer(s): Maynard Solomon

"Cod'ine" (also spelled "Codine" or "Codeine") is a contemporary folk song by the singer-songwriter Buffy Sainte-Marie. Considered one of the earliest anti-drug songs, Sainte-Marie wrote the piece after becoming addicted to codeine which she had been given for a bronchial infection. She recorded it for her debut album, It's My Way! (1964).

"Cod'ine" is a solo performance by Sainte-Marie, with her vocal accompanied by a twelve-string acoustic guitar. The lyrics are a personalized portrayal of addiction; the spelling reflects her pronunciation of the word, which rhymes with "rise" and "time" in the song's verses.

As one of her best-known songs, it is included on several compilations. Her performance at the Newport Folk Festival was filmed and appears on Murray Lerner's documentary Festival (1967). A variety of artists have recorded "Cod'ine" (usually as "Codine"), making it one of Sainte-Marie's most often covered songs.

== Background and composition ==
In the early 1960s, after Sainte-Marie contracted a bronchial infection, a doctor treated her with a regimen of codeine, an opiate painkiller and cough suppressant. She thought the injections and prescriptions were antibiotics and vitamins, but after a few weeks, she began to show signs of withdrawal between doses. Sainte-Marie contends that the original doctor did not advise her about the drug and believes that he intended to get her and other girls dependent so he could exploit them. She overcame her addiction, but it affected her deeply: her pain was compounded by a sense of betrayal and personal violation.

As a way to deal with her experience and caution others, Sainte-Marie wrote "Cod'ine". In her biography, Andrea Warner elaborated: "'Cod'ine' was written in despair but also in anger ... It was worldweary and from the bone, leaden with exhaustion and frustration and ... trauma, oppression, and violation". AllMusic critic Matthew Greenwald describes her lyrics as "accurately reflecting the horror of opiate addiction, the stark, barren imagery of the lyrics are positively frightening":

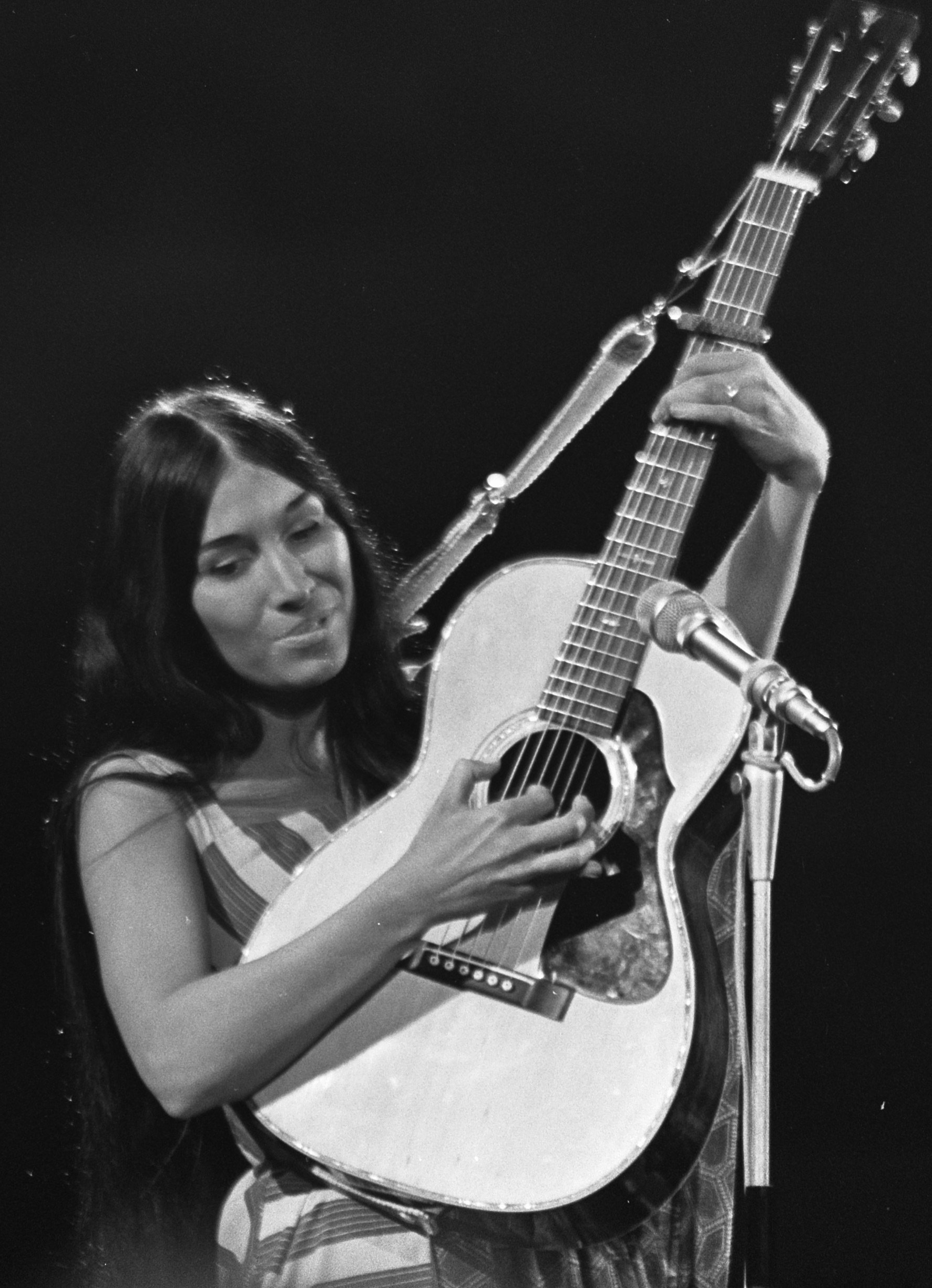
Sainte-Marie in concert, 1968

And my belly is craving, I got shakin' in my head
Feel like I'm dyin' and I wish I was dead
If I live 'til tomorrow it'll be a long time
For I'll reel and I'll fall and rise on cod'ine

Sainte-Marie's vocal delivery reflects "the wildness of her vulnerability and her broken howls are chilling ... the aftershocks of her vibrato almost swallowing words whole as she bellows, 'An' it's real, one more time'", as described by Warner. Sainte-Marie is a self-taught guitarist and often used her own alternative tunings. This allowed her to explore different chord voicings and, by using a twelve-string acoustic guitar, to add a droning quality. She recorded the song at a studio in the Manhattan Towers hotel in New York City for producer Maynard Solomon and Vanguard Records.

== Release and reception ==
In 1964, "Cod'ine" was released on Sainte-Marie's first album, It's My Way! Solomon contributed the liner notes, which included blurbs about each song. For "Cod'ine" he wrote:

The foreknowledge of death and the recapitulation of the life which made that death inevitable; a tale of drug addiction told within the mind but in the voice of the ancient (or prematurely aged) addict desperately seeking some justification for her existence; the pathetic repetition that she has avoided the additional sin of alcohol, thus keeping faith with the creed of her parents; a characterization so extraordinary and many-levelled that all consciousness of its having been "created" is lost; a macabre waltz which tetters on the edge of the grave.

The album reportedly sold well, but did not reach the album charts. John Kay, singer, guitarist and songwriter for the popular 1960s rock group Steppenwolf, recalled purchasing the album after hearing her live for the first time. He was struck by the sheer emotional intensity of songs such as "Cod'ine" and Sainte-Marie's unrestrained vocal delivery. In a retrospective album review for AllMusic, critic William Ruhlmann called it "one of the most scathing topical folk albums ever made. Sainte-Marie sings in an emotional, vibrato-laden voice ... Even decades later, the album's power is moving and disturbing".

In a song review, Greenwald called it a "true coffeehouse classic [and] one of Buffy Sainte-Marie's most well-loved (and most covered) songs". Festival!, the 1967 documentary film about the Newport Folk Festival by director Murray Lerner, includes a performance of the song by Sainte-Marie. The original appears on several compilation albums, such as The Best of Buffy Sainte-Marie (1970) and Best of the Vanguard Years (2003).

== Legacy ==
Music journalist Richie Unterberger identified "Cod'ine" as "one of the few '60s songs to explicitly address the dangers of drugs". Author Michael C. Keith includes "Cod'ine", along with "Signed D.C." written by Arthur Lee (1966, Love), "Amphetamine Annie" by Canned Heat (1968), "The Pusher" by Hoyt Axton (1968, Steppenwolf), as examples of songs from the 1960s that explore a similar theme. Although Sainte-Marie had kicked the habit, she feels that the song led some to perceive her as an addict: "In my first couple of records, whoever was choosing the takes wanted me to sound like I was kind of old and dying. I think they imagined that maybe I was a junkie or they probably thought that I was going to be a young casualty."

In 1964, Scottish folk singer Donovan recorded a demo version of "Cod'ine". (Note: In 1965, Donovan had moderate success on the record chart with his version of Sainte-Marie's composition "Universal Soldier".) Greenwald described it as "a true progressive folk music classic ... a dark, minor-key folk-blues with a fabulously simple descending guitar riff". In 1992, Donovan's demo was released on the box set, Troubadour: The Definitive Collection 1964–1976, under the title "Codine". Early demos also recorded by Janis Joplin (1965, with modified lyrics) and Gram Parsons (1965–1966) were eventually issued on compilation albums.

In the 1960s, the song became popular among musicians in the San Francisco area, usually using the title "Codine". The Charlatans recorded the song in 1966 using a folk rock arrangement for their first single. However, their record company refused to issue it because of the drug references. Later, group retrospective albums sometimes include it under the title "Codine Blues", such as The Amazing Charlatans (1996). Similarly, when Quicksilver Messenger Service recorded the song for their first single, Capitol Records was reluctant to release it. Instead, it was used for the soundtrack of Revolution (1968), a quasi-documentary film about the San Francisco scene. Greenwald commented: "[The song] took on a stronger meaning as the '60s came to a close and harder drugs were rampant. Quicksilver take and define the song by putting it into a blues/rock mode, propelled by a relentless, heavy rhythm [and they] truly make the song their own." Later, the original studio recording and a live rendition from 1968 were included on the 1999 compilation Unreleased Quicksilver Messenger Service – Lost Gold and Silver. In the album liner notes, Unterberger commented: "[The group] adopt a nastier, punkier edge than many would have believed possible given their reputation as a hippie outfit."

Alternative rock group Hole recorded a vocal with acoustic guitar version, which is included as bonus track on their Japanese album release of Nobody's Daughter (2010). Warner described it as "an amalgamation of Sainte-Marie's original and Joplin's revision, and appropriately, [Hole singer Courtney] Love's vocals suggest a similar duality—pained and defiant—but also the snarled, disaffected, painted-on cynicism that Love so often utilizes to detract from her vulnerability". (Note: Warner also notes the irony of Janis Joplin and Courtney Love as "women whose phenomenal musical talents were often eclipsed by their addictions" recording the piece. Similarly, Gram Parsons's substance abuse problems were well-known.)

== Sources ==
- Joynson, Vernon (1997). Fuzz, Acid and Flowers: A Comprehensive Guide to American Garage, Psychedelic and Hippie Rock (1964–1975). Borderline. ISBN 978-1899855063.
- Keith, Michael C. (1997). Voices in the Purple Haze: Underground Radio and the Sixties. Praeger. ISBN 978-0275952662.
- Solomon, Maynard (1964). It's My Way! (Album notes). Buffy Sainte-Marie. New York City: Vanguard Records. VSD-79142.
- Unterberger, Richie (1999). Unreleased Quicksilver Messenger Service – Lost Gold and Silver (CD booklet). Quicksilver Messenger Service. Hollywood, California: EMI Records/Capitol Records. CCM-109-2.
- Warner, Andrea (2018). Buffy Sainte-Marie: The Authorized Biography. Greystone Books. ISBN 978-1771643597.
