= Sad Boy =

Sad Boy may refer to:

- "Sad Boy" (song), a song by Jonas Blue, R3hab, Ava Max and Kylie Cantrall
- "Sad Boy" (G-Eazy song), a song by G-Eazy from When It's Dark Out
- "Sad Boy", a song by Stevie Wonder from Stevie at the Beach
- Sad Boy, a book by Michael C. Keith

== See also ==
- "Sadboy"
