= Fire & Fleet & Candlelight =

Studio album by Buffy Sainte-Marie
- Released: June 1967
- Genre: Folk rock
- Length: 36:22
- Label: Vanguard
- Producer: Maynard Solomon

Buffy Sainte-Marie chronology
Little Wheel Spin and Spin (1966)	Fire & Fleet & Candlelight (1967)	I'm Gonna Be a Country Girl Again (1968)

Professional ratings
Review scores
Source	Rating
Allmusic	3/5 stars

Fire & Fleet & Candlelight is the fourth album by the singer-songwriter Buffy Sainte-Marie.

More than its predecessor Little Wheel Spin and Spin, it marked a significant departure from the simple folk songs of her first two albums. Following the same path that Joan Baez and Judy Collins were taking at the time, Sainte-Marie relies on the orchestration of Peter Schickele on "Summer Boy", "The Carousel" and "Hey Little Bird". In contrast, "The Circle Game" and "97 Men in This Town Would Give a Half a Grand in Silver Just to Follow Me Down" feature for the first time a full rock band consisting of Bruce Langhorne on electric guitar, Alexis Rogers on drums and Russ Savakus on bass. "Song to a Seagull", the other Joni Mitchell song, is a much simpler voice-and-guitar rendition.

Her version of the traditional hymn "Lyke Wake Dirge" predates the version by Pentangle by over two years and the album's title is taken from one of the lines in that song's chorus. "T'es pas un autre" is a French language reworking of her well-known composition "Until It's Time for You to Go" that she originally recorded on her second album Many a Mile.

Sainte-Marie's version of "The Circle Game" is featured in the film Once Upon a Time in Hollywood, in the scene where Sharon Tate is driving on an L.A. freeway.

== Track listing ==
All tracks composed by Buffy Sainte-Marie; except where noted.

Side 1

1. "The Seeds of Brotherhood" – 1:24
2. "Summer Boy" – 2:39
3. "The Circle Game" (Joni Mitchell) – 2:51
4. "Lyke Wake Dirge" (music: Benjamin Britten; words: Traditional) – 3:42
5. "Song to a Seagull" (Joni Mitchell) – 3:15
6. "Doggett's Gap" (Bascom Lamar Lunsford) – 1:36
7. "The Wedding Song" – 2:12

Side 2

1. "97 Men in This Here Town Would Give a Half a Grand in Silver Just to Follow Me Down" – 3:02
2. "Lord Randall" (Traditional) – 3:27
3. "The Carousel" – 2:30
4. "T'es pas un autre" (Translated into French by Claude Gauthier) – 2:53
5. "Little Boy Dark Eyes" – 1:35
6. "Reynardine" [A Vampire Legend] (Traditional) – 2:55
7. "Hey Little Bird" – 2:10

== Personnel ==
- Buffy Sainte-Marie - vocals, guitar, Jew's harp
- Bruce Langhorne - guitar on "Doggett's Gap" and "97 Men in This Here Town Would Give a Half a Grand in Silver Just to Follow Me Down"
- Russ Savakus - bass on "97 Men in This Here Town Would Give a Half a Grand in Silver Just to Follow Me Down"
- Bob Siggins - banjo on "97 Men in This Here Town Would Give a Half a Grand in Silver Just to Follow Me Down"
- Monte Dunn - mandolin on "97 Men in This Here Town Would Give a Half a Grand in Silver Just to Follow Me Down"
- Alexis Rogers - drums on "97 Men in This Here Town Would Give a Half a Grand in Silver Just to Follow Me Down"
- Peter Schickele - orchestral arrangement, conductor on side 1 tracks 2–4, side 2 tracks 3–5

== Charts ==
Billboard (North America)

Year	Chart	Peak position
1967	Pop Albums	126
