= I'm Gonna Be a Country Girl Again =

Album by Buffy Sainte-Marie

Studio album by Buffy Sainte-Marie
- Released: July 1968
- Genres: Country, folk, Americana
- Length: 34:01
- Label: Vanguard
- Producers: Bob Lurie, Maynard Solomon

Buffy Sainte-Marie chronology
Fire & Fleet & Candlelight (1967)	I'm Gonna Be a Country Girl Again (1968)	Illuminations (1969)

Professional ratings
Review scores
Source	Rating
Allmusic	2/5 stars
Rolling Stone	(mixed)

I'm Gonna Be a Country Girl Again is the fifth album by the singer/songwriter Buffy Sainte-Marie. As its title suggested, it saw her embrace Nashville country music with the help of session veterans such as the Jordanaires, Grady Martin, Roy M. Huskey, Jr. and Floyd Cramer. The album included re-recordings of "Now That the Buffalo's Gone" and "The Piney Wood Hills" from her first and second albums respectively. "Tall Trees in Georgia", in contrast to most of the material, showed Sainte-Marie performing in a style reminiscent of her earliest work.

I'm Gonna Be a Country Girl Again was not as well received critically or even commercially as her previous four albums, and relatively few of the songs unique to it have notable cover versions (Neko Case's cover of "Soulful Shade of Blue" may be considered an exception). The title tune, however, was to become a Top 40 UK hit after she reached the Top Ten there with the title tune to the movie Soldier Blue (from her album She Used to Wanna Be a Ballerina).

== Track listing ==
All songs composed by Buffy Sainte-Marie except where noted.

1. "I'm Gonna Be a Country Girl Again" – 2:59
2. "He's a Pretty Good Man If You Ask Me" – 2:29
3. "Uncle Joe" (Traditional) – 2:10
4. "A Soulful Shade of Blue" – 2:18
5. "From the Bottom of My Heart" – 2:34
6. "Sometimes When I Get to Thinkin'" – 3:01
7. "The Piney Wood Hills" – 3:08
8. "Now That the Buffalo's Gone" – 2:56
9. "They Gotta Quit Kickin' My Dawg Around" (Traditional) – 1:39
10. "Tall Trees in Georgia" – 3:33
11. "The Love of a Good Man" – 2:54
12. "Take My Hand for Awhile" – 2:34
13. "Gonna Feel Much Better When You're Gone" – 1:46

== Charts ==
=== Weekly charts ===
Billboard (North America)

Year	Chart	Peak position
1968	Pop Albums	171

=== Single ===
Year	Single	Chart	Position
1971	"I'm Gonna Be a Country Girl Again"	Billboard Pop Singles	98
1971	"I'm Gonna Be a Country Girl Again"	UK Singles Chart	34
