= Little Wheel Spin and Spin =

Studio album by Buffy Sainte-Marie
- Released: 1966
- Genre: Folk
- Length: 40:11
- Label: Vanguard
- Producer: Maynard Solomon

Buffy Sainte-Marie chronology
Many a Mile (1965)	Little Wheel Spin and Spin (1966)	Fire & Fleet & Candlelight (1967)

Professional ratings
Review scores
Source	Rating
Allmusic	4.5/5 stars

Little Wheel Spin and Spin is the third album by Buffy Sainte-Marie, released in 1966. It was her only album to reach the Top 100 of the Billboard 200. Its most famous song is "My Country 'Tis of Thy People You're Dying," which displayed a native perspective on the colonisation of North America.

In contrast to her first two albums which were entirely acoustic with occasional use of her distinctive mouthbow, parts of Little Wheel Spin and Spin added electric guitar by Bruce Langhorne and string arrangements by Felix Pappalardi, or feature Native American performer Patrick Sky on guitar with Sainte-Marie. This served to pave the way for Sainte-Marie's stylistic experiments on her remaining Vanguard albums, where she covered territory ranging from country to rock to experimental music. Buffy Sainte-Marie wrote to reveal the "truth... about indigenous realities" through her music.

== Track listing ==
All tracks composed by Buffy Sainte-Marie; except where noted.

1. "Little Wheel Spin and Spin" – 2:29
2. "House Carpenter" (Traditional; arranged and new words by Buffy Sainte-Marie) – 3:46
3. "Waly Waly" (Traditional) – 3:50
4. "Rolling Log Blues" (chorus by Lottie Kimbrough) – 3:32
5. "My Country 'Tis of Thy People You're Dying" – 6:48
6. "Men of the Fields" – 2:02
7. "Timeless Love" – 2:46
8. "Sir Patrick Spens" (Traditional) – 5:14
9. "Poor Man's Daughter" – 2:57
10. "Lady Margaret" (Traditional) – 1:43
11. "Sometimes When I Get to Thinkin'" – 3:37
12. "Winter Boy" – 2:11

== Personnel ==
- Buffy Sainte-Marie - vocals, guitar, mouthbow
- Russ Savakus - bass
- Bruce Langhorne - electric guitar on "Little Wheel Spin and Spin", "Rolling Log Blues" and "Sometimes When I Get to Thinkin'"
- Patrick Sky - rhythm guitar on "Men of the Fields"
- Eric Weissberg - guitar on "Sometimes When I Get to Thinkin'"
- Felix Pappalardi - arrangement, conductor on "Timeless Love"

== Charts ==
Billboard (North America)

Year	Chart	Peak position
1966	Pop Albums	97
