= Mister Can't You See =

Single by Buffy Sainte-Marie

from the album Moonshot
- B-side: "Moonshot"
- Released: 1972
- Recorded: 1971
- Genre: Folk
- Length: 3:19
- Label: Vanguard
- Songwriter(s): Mickey Newbury; Townes Van Zandt
- Producer(s): Norbert Putnam; Buffy Sainte-Marie

Buffy Sainte-Marie singles chronology
"I'm Gonna Be a Country Girl Again" (1971)	"Mister Can't You See" (1972)	"He's an Indian Cowboy in the Rodeo" (1972)

"Mister Can't You See" is a song written by Mickey Newbury and Townes Van Zandt that first appeared on Newbury's 1968 debut album Harlequin Melodies. Newbury's original version was slow and dominated by strings and a very simple drumbeat, with his voice telling a tale of nature's power and beauty. The actual title of the song comes from the line "can't you see the river flowing".

== Buffy Sainte-Marie Cover ==
- "Mister Can't You See" is best known, however, as recorded by Buffy Sainte-Marie on her 1972 album Moonshot, where it was the final track and second single. Sainte-Marie's version is much shorter than Newbury's original and is more straight-ahead rock with the Memphis Horns especially prominent. Owing to a major promotional campaign by Vanguard Records, eager to make up for losses incurred with past Sainte-Marie albums, the label promoted the single vigorously and as a result it became Sainte-Marie's only single or album to reach the Top 75 on Billboard. It peaked at #38 on the Pop Singles chart and #29 on the Adult Contemporary chart.
