= Lyke-Wake Dirge =

Traditional Yorkshire-dialect English song

Song
- Language: English (Yorkshire dialect)
- Written: Unknown
- Songwriter: Unknown

The "Lyke-Wake Dirge" is a traditional English folk song and dirge listed as number 8194 in the Roud Folk Song Index. The song tells of the soul's travel, and the hazards it faces, on its way from earth to purgatory, reminding the mourners to practise charity during lifetime. Though it is from the Christian era and features references to Christianity, much of the symbolism is thought to be of pre-Christian origin.

== Title ==
The title refers to the act of watching over the dead between the death and funeral, known as a wake. "Lyke" is an obsolete word meaning a corpse. It is related to other extant Germanic words such as the German Leiche, the Dutch lijk and the Norwegian lik, all meaning "corpse". It survives in modern English in the expression lychgate, the roofed gate at the entrance to a churchyard, where, in former times, a dead body was placed before burial, and the lich, an undead monster in fantasy fiction. "Lyke-wake" could also be from the Norse influence on the Yorkshire dialect: the contemporary Norwegian and Swedish words for "wake" are still likvake and likvaka respectively (lik and vaka/vake with the same meanings as previously described for "lyke" and "wake").

== Lyrics ==
The song is written in an old form of the Yorkshire dialect of Northern English. It goes:

This ae nighte, this ae nighte,
(Refrain:) —Every nighte and alle,
Fire and fleet and candle-lighte,
(Refrain:) And Christe receive thy saule.

When thou from hence away art past,
To Whinny-muir thou com'st at last;

If ever thou gavest hosen and shoon,
Sit thee down and put them on;

If hosen and shoon thou ne'er gav'st nane
The whinnes sall prick thee to the bare bane;

From Whinny-muir when thou may'st pass,
To Brig o' Dread thou com'st at last;

From Brig o' Dread when thou may'st pass,
To Purgatory fire thou com'st at last;

If ever thou gavest meat or drink,
The fire sall never make thee shrink;

If meat or drink thou ne'er gav'st nane,
The fire will burn thee to the bare bane;

This ae nighte, this ae nighte,
—Every nighte and alle,
Fire and fleet and candle-lighte,
And Christe receive thy saule.

</poem>

— from the Oxford Book of English Verse (1900) #381

Note: ae: one; hosen: stockings; shoon: shoes; Whinny-muir moor of thorn bushes; whinnes: thorn bushes; bane: bone; brig: bridge

The safety and comfort of the soul in faring over the hazards it faces in the afterlife, are in the old ballad made contingent on the dead person's willingness in life to participate in charity. The poem was first collected by John Aubrey in 1686, who also recorded that it was being sung in 1616, but it is believed to be much older.

There would appear to be a lacuna in the version that Aubrey collected. Unlike the preceding and following pairs of stanzas, nothing happens at the Brig o' Dread. Richard Blakeborough, in his Wit, Character, Folklore, and Customs of the North Riding, fills this apparent gap with verses he says were in use in 1800, and which seem likely to be authentic:

If ivver thoo gav' o' thi siller an' gawd,
At t' Brigg o' Dreead thoo'll finnd footho'd,

Bud if o' siller an' gawd thoo nivver ga' neean,
Thoo'll doon, doon tumm'l tiwards Hell fleeames,

— Stanzas 6 and 7

Note: siller: silver; gawd: gold; footho'd: foothold

In this version, the Brig o' Dread (Bridge of Dread) is the decisive ordeal that determines whether the soul's destination is Heaven or Hell.

This ballad was one of 25 traditional works included in Ballads Weird and Wonderful (1912) and illustrated by Vernon Hill.

The Whinny-muir of this tale also appears in The Well of the World's End as the "Muir o' Heckle-pins".

== Fire and fleet ==
Some versions of the words include fire and sleet rather than fire and fleet; the latter is in Aubrey's version of the words and in the Oxford Book of English Verse. F.W. Moorman, in his book on Yorkshire dialect poetry, explains that fleet means floor and references the OED. He also notes that the expression Aboute the fyre upon flet appears in the mediaeval poem Sir Gawain and the Green Knight and explains that "Fire and fleet and candle-light are a summary of the comforts of the house, which the dead person still enjoys for this ae night, and then goes out into the dark and cold."

== Versions and performances ==
The poem has been recorded a number of times as a song. Arnold Bax set it for voice and piano in 1908 and made an orchestral version in 1934. Benjamin Britten set it to music as a part of his Serenade for Tenor, Horn and Strings in 1943, and, in his Cantata on Old English Texts of 1952, Igor Stravinsky uses individual verses as interludes between the longer movements. English composer Geoffrey Burgon wrote a duet (This Ean Night) for two countertenors (recorded by James Bowman and Charles Brett) with words altered slightly to fit the canonical single melody, the second countertenor starting one bar behind the first. At the end of each versicle the line rises by a semitone producing an eerie and climactic ending on top D before dropping back down to the starting tone.

A version with a different tune (but with the "fire and fleet" version of the lyrics) was collected by the folk song collector, Hans Fried, from the singing of "an old Scottish lady", Peggy Richards. The Young Tradition used this version for their a cappella recording on their 1965 debut album, using quite a primitive harmonisation, in which two of the vocal parts move in parallel fifths. The folk band Pentangle performed a version on their 1969 album Basket of Light, using the same tune as The Young Tradition, but elaborating the arrangement, and Al Stewart had a duet with Mimi Fariña in the "Collector's Choice" version of his Zero She Flies album. Buffy Sainte-Marie also included this song on her 1967 album Fire & Fleet & Candlelight. Most later renditions of the song use the Richards-Fried melody; these include versions by Steeleye Span, the Mediaeval Baebes (titled 'This Ay Nicht') and Alasdair Roberts. The annual Spiral Dance in San Francisco has adapted the song to a neopagan context, changing the refrain to "May earth receive thy soul". This version can be found on Let It Begin Now: Music from the Spiral Dance.

Maddy Prior, writing in the liner notes to the Steeleye Span retrospective Spanning the Years, drily characterises the song's countercultural appeal, in describing one 1970s performance:

5 nights at the LA Forum with Jethro Tull. We were opening our set at the time with the Lyke Wake Dirge, a grim piece of music from Yorkshire concerning pergatory [sic] and we all dressed in dramatic mummers ribbons with tall hats. The effect was stunning. 5 gaunt figures in line across the front of the stage, lit from below casting huge shadows, intoning this insistent dirge alarmed some members of the audience whose reality was already tampered with by 1970s substances. It was most satisfying.

In the 2013 BBC radio play Neverwhere, the angel Islington (played by Benedict Cumberbatch) sang it.

In 2014 the dirge was recorded by Matt Berninger and Andrew Bird for the AMC TV series Turn. In 2016 a version was used as the theme for BBC's The Living and the Dead supernatural horror TV series, performed by The Insects featuring Howlin' Lord.

"Lyke-Wake Dirge" is sometimes considered a ballad, but unlike a ballad it is lyric rather than narrative.

== See also ==
- Dirge – church service (office) for the dead, later somber funeral song
- "Draumkvedet" – a similar Norwegian ballad
