= She Used to Wanna Be a Ballerina =

Studio album by Buffy Sainte-Marie
- Released: March 1971
- Genre: Folk
- Length: 35:25
- Label: Vanguard
- Producer: Jack Nitzsche, Buffy Sainte-Marie

Buffy Sainte-Marie chronology
Illuminations (1969)	She Used to Wanna Be a Ballerina (1971)	Moonshot (1972)

Professional ratings
Review scores
Source	Rating
AllMusic	3/5 stars
Rolling Stone	(favourable)

She Used to Wanna Be a Ballerina is the seventh album by Buffy Sainte-Marie, released in 1971.

Her previous album Illuminations having sold so poorly as to lose Vanguard a considerable sum of money, the label placed considerable pressure on Sainte-Marie to come up with something that would sell in larger numbers. To this effect, She Used to Wanna Be a Ballerina was recorded with guitar from Jesse Ed Davis, Ry Cooder and Neil Young and assistance from the latter's backing band Crazy Horse. There was also a change in focus of the material: covers of contemporary songs, which she had almost never recorded before, accounted for five of the eleven songs. Vanguard boss Maynard Solomon, who had produced her first five albums and most of Illuminations, surrendered production duties completely to Neil Young producer Jack Nitzsche, who was later to marry Sainte-Marie after she wrote "Up Where We Belong" with him in the early 1980s.

This label-driven effort to achieve increased commercial success did briefly pay off when "Soldier Blue", the theme song from the 1970 movie of the same name reached number 7 in the UK Singles Chart and was a hit throughout Europe. It failed to chart in the States, however, and the album barely dented the Billboard Top 200, which served to strain the relationship between Sainte-Marie and Vanguard and enabled their split in 1973 after Quiet Places. Soldier Blue single received a silver disc award for 50,000 sales in Sweden.

== Track listing ==
All songs composed by Buffy Sainte-Marie except where noted.

1. "Rollin' Mill Man" (Gerry Goffin, Russ Titelman) – 2:18
2. "Smack Water Jack" (Gerry Goffin, Carole King) – 3:21
3. "Sweet September Morning" – 2:53
4. "She Used to Wanna Be a Ballerina" – 2:17
5. "Bells" – (Leonard Cohen) – 4:37
6. "Helpless" (Neil Young) – 3:11
7. "Moratorium" – 4:14
8. "The Surfer" – (Buffy Sainte-Marie, Ariel Gonzales, Carlos Pardeiro) – 2:38
9. "Song of the French Partisan" (Anna Marly, Hy Zaret) – 3:16
10. "Soldier Blue" – 3:21
11. "Now You've Been Gone for a Long Time" – 2:53

== Personnel ==
- Buffy Sainte-Marie – vocals
- Jesse Ed Davis, Neil Young, Ry Cooder – guitar
- Jack Nitzsche – piano
- Merry Clayton – background vocals
- Gayle Levant – harp
- Crazy Horse

== Charts ==
Chart (1971)	Peak position
Australia (Kent Music Report)	47
US Billboard 200	182
