= Beautiful Losers =

1966 Leonard Cohen novel

- First US edition (publ. Viking Press, preceding the Canadian edition)
- Author: Leonard Cohen
- Language: English
- Genre: Historical fiction
- Published: 1966

Beautiful Losers is the second and final novel by Canadian writer and musician Leonard Cohen. It was published in 1966, before he began his career as a singer-songwriter.

Set in the Canadian province of Quebec, the story of 17th-century Mohawk saint Catherine Tekakwitha is interwoven with a love triangle among an unnamed anglophone Canadian folklorist; his Native wife, Edith, who has committed suicide; and his best friend, the mystical F, a Member of Parliament and a leader in the Quebec separatist movement. The complex novel makes use of a vast range of literary techniques, and a wealth of allusion, imagery, and symbolism. It is filled with the mysticism, radicalism, sexuality, and drug-taking emblematic of the 1960s era, and is noted for its linguistic, technical, and sexual excesses.

Cohen wrote the novel over two eight-month sessions while living on the Greek island of Hydra in 1964 and 1965. He fasted and consumed amphetamines to focus his creativity on the novel. Despite a lavish rollout, sales were disappointing, and critics were initially unsympathetic or hostile. The book gained critical and commercial attention only after Cohen had given up novel-writing and turned to the songwriting and performing upon which his fame rests. Beautiful Losers has come to be seen as having introduced postmodernism into Canadian literature. It has become a steady seller, and is considered a part of the Canadian literary canon.

== Overview ==
The novel reflects the zeitgeist of the 1960s. While its prose is simple, the book itself is difficult, and dense in imagery and symbolism. It is broken into three "books", each with a different narrator: the historian (called "I." by critics) is the narrator of book one, "The History of Them All", which is the longest book; "A Long Letter from F." makes up the second book, a letter from F. to the narrator of the first book; and the third book is narrated by an unnamed third person, and is called "Beautiful Losers: An Epilogue in the Third Person".

=== Synopsis ===
At the centre of the novel are the members of a love triangle, united by their obsessions and fascination with a 17th-century Mohawk, Saint Catherine Tekakwitha. The triangle is made up of the unnamed narrator, an authority on the vanishing A———— tribe; his wife Edith, one of the last surviving members of the tribe; and their maniacal and domineering friend, "F.", who may or may not exist.

Book one opens with an unnamed anglophone Canadian narrator asking "Who are you, Catherine Tekakwitha?" The narrator's wife hides in an elevator shaft, intending to have her husband kill her when he comes home. Her plan misfires somewhat, however—it is a delivery boy, instead, who takes the elevator that kills her. The narrator and F. console each other in bed over Edith's death.

The narrator and F. attend a demonstration in Montreal's "Parc Lafontaine", where I. gets so caught up in the nationalistic Québécois that he joins in himself, shouting, "Fuck the English!"

The narrator flees to the treehouse F. has left him in his will.

Book two consists of a letter composed by F., intended to be read five years after his death by the narrator of book one. As such, chronologically it takes place before book one.

F. escapes the asylum he is in and makes for the treehouse he will leave for the narrator of the first book. F. is cared for in an insane asylum by nurse Mary Voolnd, of the A———— as was Edith. The letter is written in the occupational therapy room of the hospital.

Book three opens with a figure in a treehouse, with burnt fingers like the first book's narrator, but also missing a thumb, as F. did after blowing up the statue of Queen Victoria. He is being hunted down as an escaped inmate and terrorist. He is given a ride by a blond woman wearing moccasins, who calls herself Isis, in Greek.

== Primary characters ==
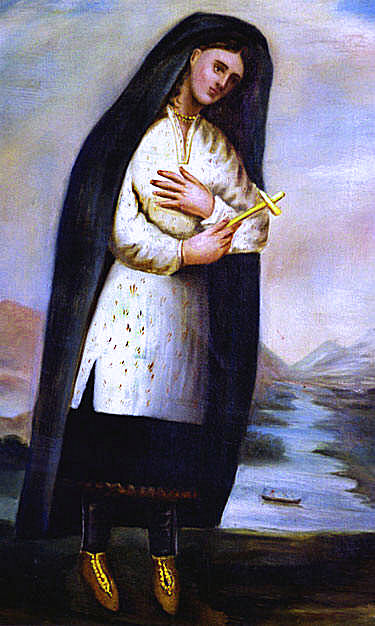
Painting of Catherine Tekakwitha; one of the primary characters in the novel

"I."
The unnamed narrator of the first book is an anthropological scholar specializing in the "A———s", a First Nations tribe whose "brief history is characterized by incessant defeat." Though unnamed, several critics have taken to calling this narrator "I."
"F."
The bewildering mystical "best friend" of "I." "I." describes their relationship as one of pupil and teacher, with F. presenting himself as having such intellectual and spiritual capacities as have enabled him to develop an all-encompassing "system," though one that escapes "I." and the reader. His declarations appear profound and truth-like, with the weight of axioms. F. is fond of quoting Nietzsche, and like Nietzsche was driven insane by syphilis. He consciously plays the role of teacher to "I."
Edith
Married to "I.", Edith is a member of the dying "A————" tribe that her husband studies.
Catherine Tekakwitha
The Mohawk Kateri Tekakwitha was a 17th-century Christian convert. She is raised by a "kind uncle" and "cruel aunts" after the death of her parents when she was four. The aunts try to get her a husband, but first he turns her down; later she runs away from him. When she returns she is beaten by her aunts. She takes to pious self-mortification with great zeal–to such a degree that the Jesuit priests find they must restrain her. Following her death at the age of 24, her skin becomes white. She is associated with Edith, the Virgin Mary and Isis throughout the work. At the time the book was written, she had been beatified by the Church and was known as Blessed Kateri Tekakwitha. In 2012 she was canonised as a saint.

== Themes ==
Francophone F. is a leader in the Quebec separatist movement (Quebec in red).

Sex plays a major role in the novel, though the sex scenes tend to be oral or masturbatory. Homosexuality and bisexuality are prominent.

Natives are seen as being displaced by the French, while the English displace the French, and are themselves oppressed by the Americans. The English and French in Canada are seen as both oppressors and oppressed, which ties F. and I. together. According to F., the Québécois are able to come together under their feeling of oppression by the anglophones, but anglophone Canada is unable to bring together a national identity to distinguish themselves from the Americans.

I. and F. were both raised in a Jesuit orphanage in Montreal. Melancholic I. identifies with victims and losers, such as the "A————" tribe, whose very name is said to mean "corpse in the language of all the neighboring tribes". while F. tries to ignore or overcome his "loser"-ness. He asserts himself by throwing himself into the Charles Axis bodybuilding course advertised in a comic book (a parody of the Charles Atlas advertisements well known to contemporary comic-book readers). He asserts his culture by becoming a leader in the Quebec separatist movement.

== Background ==
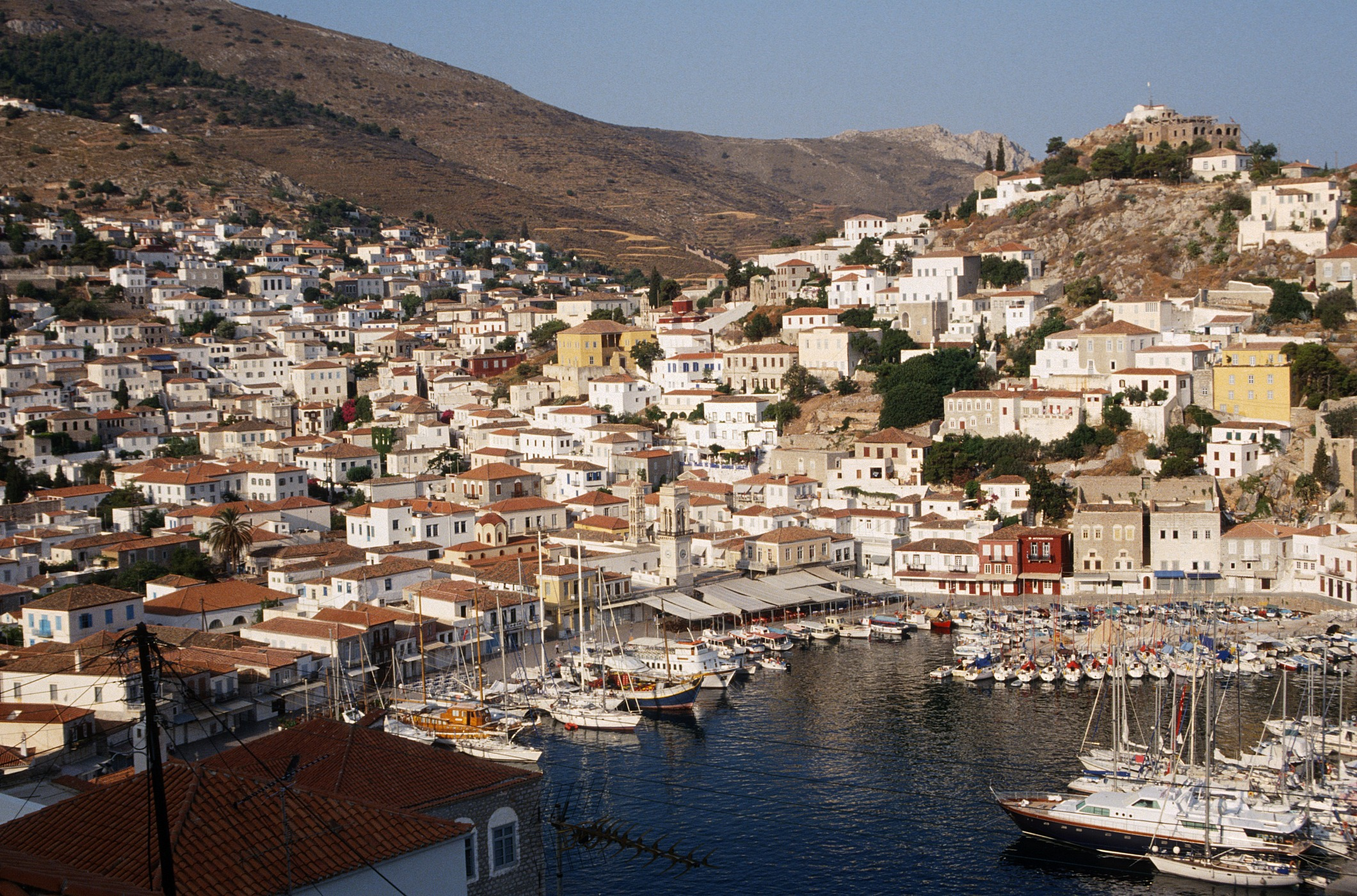
The island of Hydra, where Cohen wrote Beautiful Losers

Cohen had published a number of books of poetry since the 1956 appearance of Let Us Compare Mythologies, and one novel, The Favourite Game (1963). He had been living on the Greek island of Hydra in the early to mid-1960s, and had composed The Favourite Game and a book of poetry, Flowers for Hitler, there. On Hydra, English was spoken, and there was an artists' colony there.

Cohen wanted to write a "liturgy, a big confessional oration, very crazy, but using all the techniques of the modern novel ... pornographic suspense, humor and conventional plotting".

Cohen wrote most of the novel during two concentrated eight-month periods in 1964 and 1965. He wrote using a typewriter in a house in Hydra while listening to a portable record player, on which he listened to his favourite Ray Charles record, The Genius Sings the Blues. At first he managed only three pages a day, and sometimes wrote only one hour a day. When the novel began to take shape, he worked up to fifteen hours a day, with the help of amphetamines. He later claimed that amphetamine use was a mistake "for depressed people", as coming down was particularly hard. He said it took "ten years to fully recover".

The first period of writing was interrupted when Cohen returned to Canada in October 1964 to receive the Prix littéraire du Québec for The Favourite Game, followed by a reading tour. One result of the tour was the film Ladies and Gentlemen... Mr. Leonard Cohen, released in 1965 from the National Film Board of Canada. The tour embittered Cohen, though, as he complained about money and the lack of exposure for his first novel. He found himself torn on the issue of Quebec separation that had arisen as the Quiet Revolution heated up. Montreal's francophone community was asserting itself against the anglophone elite. The Front de Libération du Québec had begun targeting anglophones with bombs in 1963, and a statue of Queen Victoria on Sherbrooke Street was destroyed with a bomb on 12 July. This political turmoil found its way into Cohen's work when he returned to Hydra.

Cohen practised fasting during the composition of the novel, believing that it helped focus his creativity and spirituality. Following its completion, Cohen broke down, collapsing from sunstroke and amphetamine consumption. He had hallucinations, and had withered to 116 pounds after going without food for ten days.

Cohen published another book of poetry, Parasites of Heaven, in 1966, but by then it became clear to Cohen that he would be unable to make a living as a writer. He shifted focus to music, particularly after becoming interested in Bob Dylan in 1966. That year, he decided to devote himself seriously to a singing career. It was his music for which he later became well known.

== Publication history ==
In March 1965, Cohen told Jack McClelland, president of Canadian publishing house McClelland and Stewart, (Note: McClelland, who became president of McClelland and Stewart in 1961, had published Cohen since 1959.) that he would finish the novel in a month. He stated that it would be a success if it escaped the censors, and asked for a cash advance, as he was in need of money. When he completed it three weeks later, he declared that he had "written the Bhagavad Gita of 1965". He claimed he had figured out how to "write a novel in three weeks", and that he would manage four more in 1965.

Cohen pondered a number of titles for the book. On two different drafts were the titles Beautiful Losers / A Pop Novel and Plastic Birchbark / A Treatment of the World, and notes and letters show him listing many other possible titles. Viking put the difficult book through eight readings before deciding to publish it. Cohen responded to the book's acceptance with a parodic six-page letter anticipating the response of offended Canadian critics. As a condition of the book's publication, Cohen insisted on having control over the cover and jacket copy, so as to avoid the disappointment he had had with the publication of Flowers for Hitler. Further, he insisted on no quotations from critics on the jacket.

Publication was somewhat complicated when Cohen lost a carbon copy of the original manuscript to the wind. He was able to continue with revisions after having his New York agent send him another carbon copy. The pre-publication orders of 3,100 copies were more than expected. Before publication, a number of film producers were eyeing the book, such as Otto Preminger, Ulu Grosbard, Alexander Cohen and the MCA Group.

McClelland realized that censorship would be a problem in Canada, and tried to soften the blow with advance publicity via advance copies. The responses from the readers of the advance copies were too negative for him to use, however. A gala lunch was thrown a month in advance of the book's release, and about four hundred of the top names in the Canadian arts world appeared there. Posters had Cohen in a turtleneck and jacket in the hopes that such a sober pose would offset the anticipated scandal. The University of Toronto, which had started collecting Cohen's papers starting in 1964, paid Cohen $6,000 for the original manuscript.

The first printing was printed by Viking and bound by McClelland & Stewart. It included typographical extras not included in future editions, such as comic book captions, a Charles Axis advertisement, a radio transcript of Gavin and the Goddesses, and a Greek-English phrase book. The book was officially published on 28 April 1966.

Distribution was restricted, with Simpson's and W. H. Smith refusing to carry the book, despite McClelland's reassurances to W. H. Smith that "most of the people interested in pornography would not begin to understand either Cohen's purpose or his accomplishment". The $6.50 cover price dampened sales as well. Cohen thought it too high, but McClelland explained it was necessary to offset the publication costs and extensive promotion. He accused Cohen of being "unwilling to put [him]self out" in the way of promotion, and urged him to do more television and radio interviews.

== Sources and influences ==
Cohen made use of a number of texts when researching and writing Beautiful Losers:

- Une vierge iroquoise: Catherine Tekakwitha, le lis de bors de la Mohawk et du St. Laurent (1656–1680) by P. Édouard Lecompte
- Kateri of the Mohawks by Marie Cecilia Buehrle
- Jesuits in North America
- a 1943 issue of the American comic book Blue Beetle
- a farmer's almanac
- Twilight of the Idols by Friedrich Nietzsche
- The Song of Hiawatha, 1855 poem by Henry Wadsworth Longfellow

He also read Emanuel Swedenborg extensively: the first two volumes of Arcana Cœlestia, Divine Providence and Divine Love and Wisdom. He would meet with other writers at the Hydra colony to discuss works such as the Book of Revelation, the I Ching, The Secret of the Golden Flower and The Tibetan Book of the Dead. Cohen brought works by Martin Buber and Gershom Sholem to these meetings.

== Style ==
Beautiful Losers is not written in a linear, coherent fashion. Key scenes repeat themselves, and there is no timeline the reader can follow.

== Reception ==
Initial sales were poor. It sold better in the US than in Canada, but did not see significant sales until after Cohen achieved success as a singer-songwriter. The novel attracted the attention of critics, and was met with much controversy. Critic Robert Fulford called Beautiful Losers "the most revolting book ever written in Canada", while also stating it was "an important failure. At the same time it is probably the most interesting Canadian book of the year". He reported a few days later that a Toronto bookstore had not managed to sell any of the twenty-five copies it stocked eight days after publication.

Critics were less shocked by the breaking of taboos than the general public was. Instead, they objected to the novel's complexity of allusion and representation, and the demands it put on the reader due to its incoherence and indeterminacy. It would take another generation of postmodern Canadian literature before Beautiful Losers would breach the canon.

In 1966, the CBC called Beautiful Losers "one of the most radical and extraordinary works of fiction ever published in Canada", and quoted a critic from the Boston Globe who positively compared the work with the fiction of James Joyce. However, they also quoted from the previously mentioned negative review from the critic Robert Fulford.

In 1967, Desmond Pacey called Beautiful Losers "the most intricate, erudite and fascinating Canadian novel ever written". In his 1970 monograph on Cohen, Michael Ondaatje called it "the most vivid, fascinating and brave modern novel" he had read.

Beautiful Losers had been translated into eleven languages by 1990, and the sales of both of Cohen's novels have surpassed a million copies; Beautiful Losers had topped three million in sales by 2007.

== Legacy ==
Beautiful Losers has entered the canon of Canadian literature, and has been given much credit for having introduced postmodern literature to Canadian fiction.

The poem beginning "God is alive. Magic is afoot" was arranged as a song by Buffy Sainte-Marie and first recorded on her 1969 album Illuminations; the song was covered by Chris Thile on his 2021 album Laysongs.

Beautiful Losers was the inspiration for the song "Let's Be Other People" by the English band The Wonderstuff on their album Hup.

An excerpt from Beautiful Losers appears in The Young Ones (TV series) associated book "Neil's Book Of The Dead", making up almost all of chapter 6.
