= Moonshot (album) =

Studio album by Buffy Sainte-Marie
- Released: April 1972
- Genres: Rock, art pop
- Length: 32:02
- Label: Vanguard
- Producers: Norbert Putnam, Buffy Sainte-Marie

Buffy Sainte-Marie chronology
She Used to Wanna Be a Ballerina (1971)	Moonshot (1972)	Quiet Places (1973)

Singles from Moonshot
- 1. "Mister Can't You See" Released: February 1972; 2. "He's an Indian Cowboy in the Rodeo" Released: June 1972

Moonshot is a studio album by the American singer-songwriter Buffy Sainte-Marie, released in 1972 by Vanguard Records.

== Recording ==
After the very modest success of her previous album She Used to Wanna Be a Ballerina, Vanguard again teamed Sainte-Marie with renowned pop session musicians in its effort to improve sales and the amount of money she was making for the label. Most notable among those performing on Moonshot are the Memphis Horns, whilst production was by Buffy herself with Neon Philharmonic bass player Norbert Putnam, who had produced Joan Baez' last Vanguard release Blessed Are... and was to produce Buffy's next two albums as well.

== Marketing and sales ==
Although the album itself fared little better commercially than its predecessor, only spending seven weeks on the Billboard Top 200, an extensive promotional campaign by Vanguard and extensive AM radio airplay saw the closing track, a cover of Mickey Newbury's "Mister Can't You See", become Sainte-Marie's sole significant commercial success in the States, spending two weeks in the lower reaches of the Top 40 in late April and early May 1972. However, Sainte-Marie was very upset with Vanguard's extensive promotion of the single and this was one reason why she only recorded one more album for the label before moving to MCA in 1973.

== Critical reception ==
Professional ratings
Review scores
Source	Rating
AllMusic	3.5/5 stars
Christgau's Record Guide	B−
Creem	B
The Rolling Stone Album Guide	1/5 stars
Uncut	4/5 stars

According to Robert Christgau, "those who love or even respect [Saint-Marie were] dismayed" by Moonshot. Reviewing in May 1972 for The San Diego Door, Cameron Crowe derided the album as the singer's "most embarrassing to date" and a victim of overproduction in the music industry. He was particularly critical of the music's use of electric solo breaks and the Memphis Horns to emphasize the lyrics. Janet Maslin was more enthusiastic about the record in Rolling Stone, applauding Sainte-Marie's stylistic range and refashioning of her vocals to suit the music's varied moods. "What's best about Moonshot", Maslin believed, "is that, considering the kind of experimental stylistic departure it represents, it nonetheless bears such a strongly personal stamp." Ramparts magazine found the song selection effectively diverse, the music powerful, and Saint-Marie "capable of writing lines that jump out of a loudspeaker and grab the listener by the mind".

Christgau was less impressed by her "unique attempt at a rock record" when he first reviewed it for Creem, but later said she had finally done "something overtly perverse—come out of Nashville with what sounds in its most interesting moments like an art-pop record (with politics, of course)", and encouraged her to expand upon its musical experimentation. In another retrospective review, AllMusic's William Ruhlmann wrote that Moonshot was "not the Buffy Sainte-Marie of her early political period, but the album demonstrates her versatility, and it works as an appealing pop effort." Exclaim! journalist Andrea Warner recommended the record in her "essential guide" to the singer's music, writing that it is "filled with all sorts of era-specific flourishes, yet also feels timeless". Paul Evans was more critical in The Rolling Stone Album Guide (1992), regarding it as "her slightest record".

== Track listing ==
All songs composed by Buffy Sainte-Marie except where noted.

1. "Not the Lovin' Kind" – 3:53
2. "You Know How to Turn on Those Lights" – 2:05
3. "I Wanna Hold Your Hand Forever" – 2:59
4. "He's an Indian Cowboy in the Rodeo" – 2:09
5. "Lay It Down" (Gene Thomasson) – 2:47
6. "Moonshot" – 3:49
7. "Native North American Child" – 2:14
8. "My Baby Left Me" (Arthur Crudup) – 3:01
9. "Sweet Memories" (Mickey Newbury) – 3:19
10. "Jeremiah" – 3:08
11. "Mister Can't You See" (Mickey Newbury, Townes Van Zandt) – 3:17

== Personnel ==
- Buffy Sainte-Marie – vocals, guitar, piano
- Charlie McCoy – guitar, harmonica
- Billy Sanford – guitar
- Norbert Putnam – bass
- David Briggs – keyboards
- Kenny Buttrey – drums
- Oma Drake – vocals
- Patrice Holloway – vocals
- Rhetta Hughes – vocals
- Wayne Jackson – trumpet
- Gloria Jones – vocals
- Andrew Love – tenor saxophone
- Memphis Horns

== Charts ==
Billboard (North America)

Year	Chart	Peak position
1972	Pop Albums	134

=== Single ===
Year	Single	Chart	Position
1972	"Mister Can't You See"	Billboard Pop Singles	38
1972	"He's an Indian Cowboy in the Rodeo"	Billboard Pop Singles	98
