= The Circle Game (song) =

1970 song by Joni Mitchell

Song by Joni Mitchell

from the album Ladies of the Canyon
- Released: 1970
- Studio: A&M, Hollywood, California
- Genre: Folk rock
- Length: 4:51
- Label: Reprise
- Songwriter: Joni Mitchell
- Producer: Joni Mitchell

Music video
- "The Circle Game" on YouTube

"The Circle Game" is a song by Canadian singer-songwriter Joni Mitchell composed in 1966. One of her most-covered songs, it was originally recorded by Ian & Sylvia in 1967, and then by Buffy Sainte-Marie the same year, and by Tom Rush for his 1968 album of the same name. Mitchell recorded it for her 1970 album Ladies of the Canyon; it also appears on her 1974 live album Miles of Aisles.

== Background ==
The song shares a title with an award-winning collection of poetry from 1964 by fellow Canadian Margaret Atwood. But Mitchell has said that "The Circle Game" was written as a response to the song "Sugar Mountain" by Neil Young, whom she had befriended on the Canadian folk-music circuit in the mid-1960s. Young wrote "Sugar Mountain" in 1964 on his 19th birthday, lamenting the end of his teenage years: "You can't be 20 on Sugar Mountain". "The Circle Game" offers a more hopeful conclusion: "So the years spin by and now the boy is 20 / Though his dreams have lost some grandeur coming true / There'll be new dreams, maybe better dreams and plenty / Before the last revolving year is through."

In a concert at the Paris Theatre in London on October 29, 1970, Mitchell opened her performance of "The Circle Game" with this speech:

In 1965 I was up in Canada, and there was a friend of mine up there who had just left a rock'n'roll band (...) he had just newly turned 21, and that meant he was no longer allowed into his favourite haunt, which was kind of a teeny-bopper club and once you're over 21 you couldn't get back in there anymore; so he was really feeling terrible because his girlfriends and everybody that he wanted to hang out with, his band could still go there, you know, but it's one of the things that drove him to become a folk singer was that he couldn't play in this club anymore. 'Cause he was over the hill. (...) So he wrote this song that was called "Oh to Live on Sugar Mountain" which was a lament for his lost youth. (...) And I thought, God, you know, if we get to 21 and there's nothing after that, that's a pretty bleak future, so I wrote a song for him, and for myself just to give me some hope. It's called "The Circle Game."

Mitchell composed the song in 1966. That year, Mitchell performed songs at a Detroit nightclub where Tom Rush was headlining. Rush asked Mitchell to put some songs on tape for him, and she put "The Circle Game" at the end of the tape. Rush was quoted as saying, "As long as kids grow up, that tune will be relevant."

Before Rush could release the song, it was recorded in 1967 by Ian & Sylvia for their album So Much for Dreaming and by Buffy Sainte-Marie for her album Fire & Fleet & Candlelight. Rush recorded the song as the title track of his 1968 album The Circle Game, which also featured the Mitchell compositions "Tin Angel" and "Urge for Going".

Mitchell recorded the song for her 1970 album Ladies of the Canyon, with backing vocals by Crosby, Stills & Nash credited under the pseudonym "The Lookout Mountain United Downstairs Choir" also including Leni Ashmore of the early 1960s all girl folk band The Womenfolk on the song Circle Game.

== Buffy Sainte-Marie version ==
"The Circle Game"

Single by Buffy Sainte-Marie

from the album Fire & Fleet & Candlelight
- B-side: "Until It's Time for You to Go"
- Released: June 1967
- Recorded: 1967
- Genre: Folk
- Length: 2:51
- Label: Vanguard
- Songwriter: Joni Mitchell
- Producer: Maynard Solomon

Cover art
- 1970 French reissue

Music video
- "The Circle Game" on YouTube by Buffy Sainte-Marie from her 1966 album Fire & Fleet & Candlelight.

When Buffy Sainte-Marie recorded "The Circle Game" in 1967 for her album Fire & Fleet & Candlelight, it was also released as a single (with "Until It's Time for You to Go" as the B-side) but did not chart. Sainte-Marie's version was later featured on the soundtrack to the 1970 film The Strawberry Statement and was reissued as a single. The 1970 reissue reached No. 109 on the Billboard singles chart.

Sainte-Marie's version of "The Circle Game" is featured in Quentin Tarantino's 2019 film Once Upon a Time in Hollywood, in the scene where Sharon Tate (Margot Robbie) is driving on an L.A. freeway. It also appears on the film's soundtrack.

== Other cover versions ==
Mitchell's song has been covered by many other artists over the decades, including George Hamilton IV (1968), Harry Belafonte (1971), Agnes Chan (1971), Ian McCulloch (1989), and Tori Amos (2005). It was featured in the opening and closing credits as well as one of the final scenes of the 1991 film Married to It.

== Legacy ==
The song inspired David Clayton-Thomas when he was writing Blood, Sweat & Tears' 1969 hit "Spinning Wheel". The line "The painted ponies go up and down" gave him the idea to write "Ride a painted pony let the spinnin' wheel spin".
