= Illuminations (Buffy Sainte-Marie album) =

Studio album by Buffy Sainte-Marie
- Released: 1969
- Recorded: 1969
- Studios: Electronic Music Studios at State University of New York, Albany, New York
- Genre: Freak folk
- Length: 35:51
- Label: Vanguard
- Producers: Maynard Solomon (tracks 1 to 6, 8 and 12); Mark Roth (tracks 7, 9 to 11)

Buffy Sainte-Marie chronology
I'm Gonna Be a Country Girl Again (1968)	Illuminations (1969)	She Used to Wanna Be a Ballerina (1971)

Singles from Illuminations
- 1. "Better to Find Out for Yourself" Released: 1969

Professional ratings
Review scores
Source	Rating
AllMusic	4.5/5 stars
Pitchfork	9.0/10

Illuminations is the sixth album by the American singer Buffy Sainte-Marie, released in 1969 on Vanguard Records. From a foundation of vocals and acoustic guitar, Sainte-Marie and producer Maynard Solomon made pioneering use of the Buchla 100 synthesizer to create electronically treated vocals. The album's only single was "Better to Find Out for Yourself".

British experimental music magazine The Wire listed Illuminations amongst its '100 Albums that Set the World on Fire While No-One was Listening'. Pitchfork ranked it the 66th best album of the 1960s.

== Production ==
The album was among the first to make prominent use of the Buchla synthesizer, which was previously featured on Morton Subotnick's 1967 recording Silver Apples of the Moon. On Illuminations, the synthesizer was employed to create treated electronic sound, particularly of Sainte-Marie's voice. The opening track "God Is Alive, Magic Is Afoot" featured lyrics taken from Leonard Cohen's novel Beautiful Losers. Peter Schickele provided arrangements to "Mary", "Adam" and "The Angel", whilst the tracks "Suffer the Little Children", "With You, Honey", "Guess Who I Saw in Paris" and "He's a Keeper of the Fire" were the first of Saint-Marie's not to be produced by Vanguard boss Maynard Solomon. They had a stripped-down rock sound and were produced by little-known folk-jazz songwriter Mark Roth. Bob Bozina played guitar, John Craviotta drums and percussion, and Rick Oxendine played bass.

== Quadraphonic recording ==
In addition to the usual 2-channel stereo recording, the album was also mixed for 4-channel quadraphonic sound. The quad version was released in the US on Q4 open reel tape by Vanguard in 1969. The label described these early 4-channel tapes as "Surround Stereo" because the term quadraphonic had not yet been widely adopted. The quad version appeared later on LP record in 1971 in Japan using the QS Regular Matrix encoding system.

== Reception ==
Illuminations has acquired a fan base quite distinct from that associated with any of Sainte-Marie's other albums. In addition to its being cited as a favourite album by a number of musicians (notably Steve Hackett), a number of critics have seen its twisted, eerie soundscapes as laying the grounds for the evolution of electronica and gothic music.

In 2000, just before Vanguard re-issued it on CD, Wire magazine listed Illuminations amongst its '100 Albums that Set the World on Fire While No-One was Listening'.

== Track listing ==
All songs composed by Buffy Sainte-Marie except where noted.

1. "God Is Alive, Magic Is Afoot" (text by Leonard Cohen from his novel Beautiful Losers / music by Buffy Sainte-Marie) – 4:51
2. "Mary" – 1:30
3. "Better to Find Out for Yourself" – 2:12
4. "The Vampire" – 2:05
5. "Adam" (Richie Havens) – 5:05
6. "The Dream Tree" – 2:34
7. "Suffer the Little Children" – 2:53
8. "The Angel" (Ed Freeman) – 3:41
9. "With You, Honey" – 1:48
10. "Guess Who I Saw in Paris" – 2:25
11. "He's a Keeper of the Fire" – 3:21
12. "Poppies" – 3:26

== Personnel ==
- Vocals, Guitar – Buffy Sainte Marie
- Electronic Score – Michael Czajkowski
- Bass – Rick Oxendine (tracks: 9, 10, 11)
- Drums – John Craviotto (tracks: 9, 10, 11)
- Lead Guitar – Bob Bozina (tracks: 6, 9, 10, 11)
- Arranged By – Peter Schickele (tracks: 2, 5, 8)
- Engineer – Bob Lurie, Ed Friedner
- Mixed By – Jack Lathrop
- Producer – Maynard Solomon (tracks 1 to 6, 8, 12)
- Producer – Mark Roth (tracks: 7, 9 to 11)
