= Now That the Buffalo's Gone =

Song by Buffy Sainte-Marie

from the album It's My Way!
- Released: 1964
- Genre: Folk
- Length: 2:46
- Label: Vanguard
- Songwriter: Buffy Sainte-Marie
- Producer: Maynard Solomon

"Now That the Buffalo's Gone"
A sample of Buffy Sainte-Marie's "Now That the Buffalo's Gone".

"Now That the Buffalo's Gone" is the first song from the 1964 album It's My Way! by singer-songwriter Buffy Sainte-Marie. The song's title refers to the near-extinction of the American bison and serves as a metaphor for the cultural genocide inflicted by Europeans. A classic folk protest song, "Now That the Buffalo's Gone" has a simple arrangement with guitar and vocals by Sainte-Marie and bass played by Art Davis. The song is a lament that addresses the continuous confiscation of Indian lands. In the song, Sainte-Marie contrasts the treatment of post-war Germany, whose people were allowed to keep their land and their dignity, to that of the North American Indians.

As a contemporary example, Sainte-Marie mentions how the Treaty of Canandaigua was broken through the building of the Kinzua Dam. She refers to the dam again in her 1966 song "My Country ‘Tis of Thy People You’re Dying." While her original lyrics claimed that George Washington signed the treaty, it was actually his agent, Timothy Pickering who signed. Sainte-Marie later changed the lyrics to refer to a "treaty forever your senators sign." The song describes ongoing governmental attempts to wrest land from the Cheyenne, Iroquois and Seneca. Sainte-Marie recorded the song again for her 1968 album I'm Gonna Be a Country Girl Again, updating the lyrics from "that of the Seneca and the Cheyenne" to "that of the Chippewa and the Cheyenne" and again for the 1996 album Up Where We Belong with the lyrics "the government now wants the Navajo land, that of the Inuit and the Cheyenne." The 1996 version removed any mention of the Kinzua Dam, a change that was explained by Sainte-Marie on her website "This song was on my first album and I'd have thought it would be obsolete by now. But governments are still breaking promises and stealing indigenous lands, and I still believe that informed people can help make things better."

Sainte-Marie allowed historian Alvin M. Josephy, Jr. to use the song's title for his 1984 book of the same name.

At the 2022 Sainte-Marie tribute show Buffy Sainte-Marie: Starwalker, the song was performed by singer-songwriter William Prince with the surviving members of The Tragically Hip.

Sainte-Marie’s first song demonstrates a connection to her alleged culture. Her claims of being Indigenous were later disproven.
