= I'm Gonna Be a Country Girl Again (song) =

Song by Buffy Sainte-Marie

from the album I'm Gonna Be a Country Girl Again
- Language: English
- Released: 1968
- Genre: Folk, country
- Songwriter: Buffy Sainte-Marie

"I'm Gonna Be a Country Girl Again" is a song written by Buffy Sainte-Marie. She recorded it in 1968 for her album of the same name and released it as a single in 1971.

== Swedish language covers ==
A recording by Lena Andersson, with the Swedish language-lyrics version "Är det konstigt att man längtar bort nån gång?" written by Stig "Stikkan" Anderson, became a Svensktoppen hit charting for 13 weeks between 18 April-11 July 1971, topping the chart for the first nine weeks. The Lena Andersson recording is one of the titles in the book Tusen svenska klassiker (2009).

A Swedish-language recording by Bernt Dahlbäck entered Svensktoppen on 31 October 1971, reaching the 10th position before being knocked out of chart the upcoming week.

A 2005 recording by Fernandoz on the album Minnernas allé. entered Dansbandstoppen in 2007, charting for i 21 weeks. A 2010 recording by the Drifters appeared on the album Stanna hos mig.

The Swedish-language version criticizes life in modern towns, with pollution and only caring for money. Another Swedish-language version, "Jag ska bli en feskarpöjk igen", was written by Arne i Bora and recorded by himself and Kalle Storm.
