= Harry Slochower =

Austrian-American scholar (1900–1991)

- Born: Hersch Zloczower; September 1, 1900; Bukowina, Austria-Hungary
- Died: May 11, 1991 (aged 90); Brooklyn, New York, U.S.
- Education: College of the City of New York (B.S. in philosophy and German, 1923); Columbia University (M.A., 1924; PhD, 1928); Universities of Munich, Berlin, and Heidelberg (1925–1926)
- Occupations: Literary critic; philosopher; psychoanalyst

Harry Slochower (born Hersch Zloczower; September 1, 1900 – May 11, 1991) was an Austrian-born American scholar, literary critic, philosopher, and psychoanalyst. He taught German literature, comparative literature, and philosophy at Brooklyn College from 1928 to 1952, and later taught at The New School for Social Research. In 1952 he was dismissed from Brooklyn College after invoking the Fifth Amendment before a Senate committee investigating communism; the U.S. Supreme Court later ruled that he had been denied due process.

== Biography ==
=== Early life and education ===
Slochower was born Hersch Zloczower in Bukowina, then part of Austria-Hungary and now divided between Romania and Ukraine. He arrived in the United States on the SS Frankfurt in October 1913, joining his parents, who had arrived in February 1911.

He grew up in the Bronx and studied philosophy and German at the City College of New York, graduating in 1923. He also studied at the universities of Berlin, Munich, and Heidelberg, and received his doctorate from Columbia University for a study of Richard Dehmel. In 1929, he received a Guggenheim Fellowship for a study of the "infiltration of Schopenhauer's pessimism into German literature".

=== Academic and psychoanalytic career ===
From 1924, Slochower taught German and English to immigrants at several schools in New York. From 1928 to 1952, he taught German literature, comparative literature, and philosophy at Brooklyn College.

In 1952, Slochower was questioned by the Senate Internal Security Subcommittee about whether he had previously been a member of the Communist Party USA. He denied involvement with the party during the previous 11 years, but invoked the Fifth Amendment when asked about earlier membership. The Board of Higher Education of the City of New York dismissed him from Brooklyn College, together with Vera Shlakman of Queens College and Bernard Riess of Hunter College.

Slochower challenged the dismissal in court. In 1956, the U.S. Supreme Court ruled that he had been denied due process. He was reinstated and awarded back pay of $40,000, but was later suspended again on a charge that he had lied before the Senate committee. He subsequently resigned from Brooklyn College and worked as a psychoanalyst. From 1964 to 1989, he taught at The New School for Social Research in New York.

Slochower's writing dealt mainly with psychoanalytic interpretations of literature. His works include Three Ways of Modern Man (1937), Thomas Mann's Joseph Story: An Interpretation (1938), No Voice Is Wholly Lost (1945), and Mythopoesis: Mythic Patterns in the Literary Classics (1970). He also contributed to philosophical, literary, and psychoanalytic journals. Slochower was president of the Association for Applied Psychoanalysis and, from 1964 until his death, was editor of the psychoanalysis journal American Imago.

=== Death ===
Slochower died in Brooklyn, New York, on May 11, 1991, aged 90.

== Publications ==
=== Books ===
- Richard Dehmel: Der Mensch und der Denker (Dresden, 1928)
- Three Ways of Modern Man (New York, 1937)
- Thomas Mann's Joseph Story: An Interpretation (New York, 1938)
- No Voice Is Wholly Lost (New York, 1945)
- Mythopoesis: Mythic Patterns in the Literary Classics (Detroit: Wayne State University Press, 1970)
