= It's My Way! =

Studio album by Buffy Sainte-Marie
- Released: April 1964
- Genre: Folk
- Length: 40:35
- Label: Vanguard
- Producer: Maynard Solomon

Buffy Sainte-Marie chronology
It's My Way! (1964)	Many a Mile (1965)

It's My Way! is the debut album by the folk musician Buffy Sainte-Marie. It was released in April 1964 through Vanguard Records. It was later released in Britain in early 1965 by Fontana Records. The album would become influential in the folk community. It is most famous for two widely covered folk standards, "Universal Soldier" and "Cod'ine", as well as "Now That the Buffalo's Gone", a lament about the continued confiscation of Indian lands, as evidenced by the building of the Kinzua Dam. The cover features a mouthbow, which was to be a trademark of her sound on her first three albums.

In 2016, It's My Way! was inducted by the Library of Congress into the National Recording Registry.

In 2020 the album was named as one of two jury vote winners, alongside Main Source's Breaking Atoms, of the Polaris Heritage Prize at the 2020 Polaris Music Prize. This award was rescinded in 2025, following the revocation of Sainte-Marie's membership in the Order of Canada.

== Reception ==
Professional ratings
Review scores
Source	Rating
AllMusic	5/5 stars

Writing for Allmusic, music critic William Ruhlman gave the album 5 of 5 stars and wrote "This is one of the most scathing topical folk albums ever made... Even decades later, the album's power is moving and disturbing."

== Track listing ==
All tracks are written by Buffy Sainte-Marie, except where noted.

Side one
No.	Title	Writer(s)	Length
1.	"Now That the Buffalo's Gone"		2:45
2.	"The Old Man's Lament"		3:55
3.	"Ananias"	Adapted by Buffy Sainte-Marie	2:35
4.	"Mayoo Sto Hoon"		1:19
5.	"Cod'ine"		5:01
6.	"Cripple Creek"	Folk song	1:45
7.	"The Universal Soldier"		2:15

Side two
No.	Title	Writer(s)	Length
8.	"Babe in Arms"		2:30
9.	"He Lived Alone in Town"		4:35
10.	"You're Gonna Need Somebody on Your Bond"	Traditional	2:45
11.	"The Incest Song"		4:11
12.	"Eyes of Amber"		2:16
13.	"It's My Way"		3:29

== Personnel ==
- Buffy Sainte-Marie – vocals, guitar, arrangements
- Patrick Sky – second guitar on "He Lived Alone in Town"
- Art Davis – bass on "Now That the Buffalo's Gone"
