= Many a Mile =

Studio album by Buffy Sainte-Marie
- Released: 1965
- Genre: Folk
- Length: 36:33
- Label: Vanguard
- Producer: Maynard Solomon

Buffy Sainte-Marie chronology
It's My Way! (1964)	Many a Mile (1965)	Little Wheel Spin and Spin (1966)

Professional ratings
Review scores
Source	Rating
Allmusic	3/5 stars

Many a Mile is Buffy Sainte-Marie's second album, released in 1965.

Though originally released on Vanguard Records, it was never reissued on CD when the rest of Sainte-Marie's catalog for that label came out in the late 1990s. It was reissued on CD in Italy via Fontana Records, and in 2015 in the United Kingdom via Ace Records.

The album contained a larger proportion of traditional material than her debut, including a number of Child Ballads. The most famous song here is "Until It's Time for You to Go", which has been covered by Cher, Neil Diamond, Shirley Bassey, Françoise Hardy and Elvis Presley. "Groundhog" shows Sainte-Marie playing her unique mouthbow. The song "The Piney Wood Hills" was re-recorded for I'm Gonna Be a Country Girl Again three years later (in a Nashville country arrangement), and again thirty years later on the album Up Where We Belong.

== Track listing ==
All tracks composed by Buffy Sainte-Marie, except where noted.

Side one

1. "Must I Go Bound" (Traditional; arranged by Buffy Sainte-Marie) – 2:36
2. "Los Pescadores (The Fishermen)" – 2:01
3. "Groundhog" (Traditional) – 2:13
4. "On the Banks of Red Roses" (Traditional; arranged by Buffy Sainte-Marie) – 2:36
5. "Fixin' to Die" (Bukka White) – 2:29
6. "Until It's Time for You to Go" – 2:27
7. "The Piney Wood Hills" – 3:40

Side two

8. "Welcome, Welcome Emigrante" – 2:12
9. "Broke Down Girl" – 2:00
10. "Johnny Be Fair" – 1:44
11. "Maple Sugar Boy" (Traditional; arranged by Buffy Sainte-Marie) – 1:42
12. "Lazarus" (Traditional; arranged by Buffy Sainte-Marie) – 2:56
13. "Come All Ye Fair and Tender Ladies" (Traditional; arranged by Buffy Sainte-Marie) – 4:48
14. "Many a Mile" (Patrick Sky) – 2:42

== Personnel ==
- Buffy Sainte-Marie – vocals, guitar, mouthbow
- Russ Savakus – string bass
- Daddy Bones – second guitar on "The Piney Wood Hills"
- Patrick Sky – second guitar on "Many a Mile"

Technical

- Jules Halfant – design
- Ken Van Sickle – photography
