= American Imago =

- Discipline: Literature, psychology, social theory
- Language: English
- Edited by: Jane Hanenberg

Publication details
- History: 1939–present
- Publisher: Johns Hopkins University Press for the Boston Psychoanalytic Society and Institute (United States)
- Frequency: Quarterly

Standard abbreviations
- ISO 4: Am. Imago

Indexing
- ISSN: 0065-860X (print); 1085-7931 (web)
- OCLC no.: 33418817

Links
- Journal homepage; Online access

American Imago is an academic journal established in 1939 by Sigmund Freud and Hanns Sachs as the successor to their and Otto Rank's 1912 journal Imago. It seeks to explore the role of psychoanalysis in contemporary cultural, literary, and social theory, while also considering issues related to anthropology, philosophy, politics, cultural studies, history, art history, musicology, education, and gender studies.

The current editor-in-chief of the journal is Jane Hanenberg. Past editors include Murray M. Schwartz, Louis Rose, Hanns Sachs, Harry Slochower, and George B. Wilbur. The journal is published by the Johns Hopkins University Press.
