= Russ Savakus =

American session bassist (1925–1984)

Russell Savakus (May 13, 1925 – June 26, 1984) was an American session bass player (both electric and stand-up), violinist and singer. Savakus recorded with numerous artists in and around the 1960s folk and folk-rock movement in New York. Earlier, he had been a part of the rhythm section for the Les Elgart swing band.

According to Michael Bloomfield, who met Savakus at a Bob Dylan session: "They had a bass player, a terrific guy, Russ Savakus. It was his first day playing electric bass, and he was scared of that. No one understood nothing." However, Dylan chose to replace Savakus on tour.

Savakus died at age 59 on the evening of June 26, 1984, when his car collided head-on at Bangor Road in Washington Township, Pennsylvania. Bangor Road is located in Northampton County.

== Discography ==
Songs and records that Savakus played on include:

- Embraceable You, Chet Baker (1957)
- Walk On By, Dionne Warwick (1964)
- Farewell, Angelina, Joan Baez (1965)
- The In Instrumentals, Kai Winding (Verve, 1965)
- Reflections in a Crystal Wind, Richard & Mimi Fariña (1965)
- Highway 61 Revisited, Bob Dylan (1965)
- Early Morning Rain, Ian and Sylvia (1965)
- Many a Mile, Buffy Saint-Marie (1965)
- Southbound, Doc Watson (1966)
- I'm a Believer, The Monkees (1966)
- Kites are Fun, The Free Design (1967)
- Fire & Fleet & Candlelight, Buffy Saint-Marie (1967)
- Brown Eyed Girl, Van Morrison (1967)
- Memories, Richard & Mimi Fariña (1968)
- The Corporation: Vinnie Bell, Dick Hyman, Bill LaVorgna, Phil Bodner, Bucky Pizzarelli, Russ Savakus (1968)
- Rhymes and Reasons, John Denver (1969)
- Take Me to Tomorrow, John Denver (1970)
- David Clayton-Thomas, David Clayton-Thomas (1972)
- Don McLean, Don McLean (1972)
- Extension of a Man, Donny Hathaway (1973)
- Playin' Favorites, Don McLean (1973)
- Never Letting Go, Phoebe Snow (1977)
- Times of Our Lives, Judy Collins (1982)
