= Michael C. Keith =

American media historian and author (born 1945)

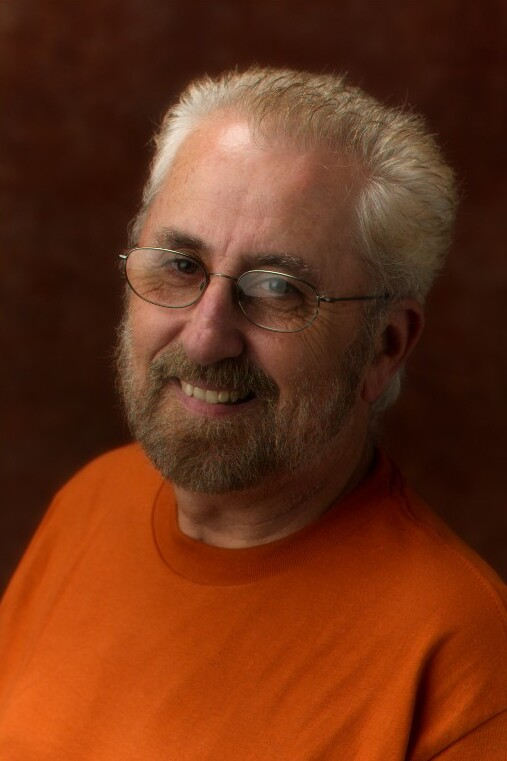
Michael C. Keith

Michael C. Keith (born 1945 in Albany, New York) is an American media historian and author. He has served as a faculty member of the Boston College Communication Department since 1993 and is the author of some two dozen books on media. He is one of the country's foremost authorities on the social impact and role of radio in American culture. He has lectured in Russia, Spain, Tanzania, and at several institutions in the U.S. and Canada. He was appointed emeritus professor in 2017 upon retiring from Boston College.

Keith served as a visiting professor at George Washington University and Marquette University and Director of Telecommunications at Dean College. He frequently appears in both American and foreign media as an authority on electronic media. Prior to becoming a full-time academic in the late 1970s, he worked as a broadcast professional for more than a decade.

In his publications, Keith combines his own experience, contacts in and beyond the radio business, and research to analyze the decline of broadcast radio.

A number of his books have been co-authored with Robert Hilliard, now retired from Emerson College. The team usually works with Keith conceiving the topic and doing much of the initial legwork research and Hilliard taking on the initial book manuscript draft. They both work on the final version. Their co-authored works, and those of Keith alone, often tackle controversial topics such as the demise of local radio programming (2005); the legal intricacies of indecent or even obscene programming (2003); the use of radio by extreme hate groups (1999), a title on President Clinton's summer reading list one year; and the use of radio by Native Americans (1995), the first monograph to appear on that topic.

Keith has been a Stanton Fellow of the International Radio & Television Society and received the Distinguished Scholar Award given by the Broadcast Education Association and the Achievement Award in the Humanities by the University of Rhode Island.

In addition to his many media books and academic articles, Keith has written a well-reviewed memoir of his unconventional childhood years — The Next Better Place (Algonquin Books, 2003) — as well as a coming of age novel, Life is Falling Sideways (Parlance, 2009). He has written an ever-expanding list of short stories, which have appeared in numerous online and print journals, such as The Literati Quarterly, The Penmen Review, Lowestoft Chronicle, "Grey Sparrow Journal," and several annual anthologies. Collections of his stories are available in paperback editions and in ebook formats; these include Hoag's Object (Whiskey Creek Press), And Through the Trembling Air and Of Night and Light (Blue Mustang Press), Sad Boy (Big Table Publishing), Everything is Epic (Silver Birch Press), The Collector of Tears (Underground Voices), If Things Were Made To Last Forever (Big Table Publishing), Caricatures (Strange Days Books), The Near Enough (Cold River Press), Bits, Specks, Crumbs, Flecks (Vraeyda Literary), Slow Transit (Cervena Barva Press), Perspective Drifts Like a Log on a River (PalmArt Press), Let Us Now Speak of Extinction (MadHat Press), Stories in the Key of Me (Regal House Publishing), "Insomnia 11" (Mad Hat Press),"Leaning West" (Cervena Barva Press), "Pieces of Bones and Rags" (Cabal Books), "Quiet Geography" (Cervena Barva Press), The Late Epiphany of a Low Key Oracle (Scantic Books),"Bodies in Recline" (Pelekinesis), "Euphony (Bamboo Dart Press), "The Loneliness Channel" (Scantic Books), "Pings: New and Selected Nanoscopic Prose Poems" (Pierian Springs Press), "Methods of Repair" (Scantic Books), and "All the Noise in the Room" (MadHat Press). His fiction has been nominated for the Pushcart Prize, Pen/O.Henry Award, IPPY Award, Pen/Faulkner Award, among others. His work has been translated in Greece, Albania, Russia, Germany, Indonesia, Spain, and China.

== Work ==
- (See above).
- PINGS: New and Selected Nanoscopic Prose Poetry | ISBN 978-1965784273 | Pierian Springs Press, 2025
- Bits Specks Crumbs Flecks short story collection, Vraeyda Media, 2015
- "Scar", short story at Blue Lake Review, May 2011
- Norman Corwin’s ‘One World Flight:’ The Lost Journal of Radio’s Greatest Writer (with Mary Ann Watson), Continuum, 2009
- The Radio Station, 8th ed. Boston: Focal Press, 2009
- Sounds of Change: FM Broadcasting in America (with Christopher H. Sterling), University of North Carolina Press, 2008
- Radio Cultures: The Sound Medium in American Life (editor), Peter Lang, 2008
- The Quieted Voice: The Rise and Demise of Localism in American Radio (with Robert Hilliard), Southern Illinois University Press, 2005
- The Broadcast Century and Beyond: A Biography of American Broadcasting, 4th ed. (with Robert Hilliard) Focal Press, 2005
- Dirty Discourse: Sex and Indecency in American Radio (with Robert Hilliard), Blackwell Publishing, 2003.
- Sounds In the Dark: All Night Radio in American Life, Iowa State University Press, 2001
- Queer Airwaves: Gay and Lesbian Broadcasting in America (with Phylis Johnson), M.E. Sharpe, 2001.
- Talking Radio: An Oral History of American Radio in the Television Age, M.E. Sharpe, 2000
- Waves of Rancor: Tuning in the Radical Right (with Robert Hilliard), M.E. Sharpe, 1999
- The Hidden Screen (with Robert Hilliard), Focal, 1999
- Voices In the Purple Haze: Underground Radio and the Sixties, Praeger, 1997
- Global Broadcasting Systems (with Robert Hilliard), Focal, 1996
- Signals In the Air: Native Broadcasting In America, Praeger, 1995
- Selling Radio Direct (with Robert Hilliard), Broadcasting, 1992
- Radio Production: Art and Science, Focal, 1990
- Broadcast Voice Performance, Focal, 1989
- Radio Programming: Consultancy and Formatics, Focal, 1987
- Production in Format Radio Handbook, University Press of America, 1984
