= Maynard Solomon =

American music executive and musicologist (1930–2020)

Maynard Elliott Solomon (January 5, 1930 – September 28, 2020) was an American music executive and musicologist. In his career in the music industry, he was a co-founder of Vanguard Records as well as a music producer. Later, he took up musicology, becoming well known for his biographical studies of Viennese Classical composers, specifically Beethoven, Mozart, and Schubert.

== Education ==
Having attended New York's High School of Music & Art, Solomon graduated Phi Beta Kappa from Brooklyn College, CUNY, with a BA in 1950, subsequently pursuing graduate studies at Columbia University from 1950 to 1952. In 1979 he became adjunct associate professor at the Graduate School, CUNY, and between 1988 and 1994 held visiting professorships at SUNY Stony Brook, Columbia University, Harvard University and Yale University, joining the graduate faculty of the Juilliard School of Music in 1998.

== Career in the recording industry ==
Maynard Solomon founded Vanguard Records jointly with his brother Seymour Solomon in 1950. They started the business with a $10,000 loan from their father, Seymour becoming company president and Maynard, the younger brother, vice president. The label was one of the prime movers in the folk and blues boom for the next fifteen years, as well as being a major classical label. As well as producing many albums, Solomon was a prolific writer of liner notes; a foreshadowing of his later career as music scholar.

His nascent venture's first disc was of J.S. Bach's 21st cantata, "Ich hatte viel Bekümmernis, BWV 21" ("I had much grief"), with Jonathan Sternberg conducting Hugues Cuénod and other soloists, chorus and orchestra. "What speaks for the Solomons' steadfastness in their taste and their task", wrote a Billboard journalist in November 1966, "is that this record is still alive in the catalogue (SC-501). As Seymour says, it was a good performance, not easy to top. Of the whole Vanguard/Bach Guild catalogue, numbering about 480 issues, 30 are Bach records..."

Vanguard's first non-classical signing was The Weavers. They generated the first major commercial success for the label with that group's 1955 Carnegie Hall concert. Solomon also acquired the rights to record and release material from the Newport Folk Festival, which meant he could issue recordings by artists who had not actually signed with Vanguard. In this period, Elektra was the main competitor for folk artists. Their singers, Phil Ochs and Judy Collins, were recorded at Newport, as was dynamic young Columbia artist Bob Dylan. The Solomons continued to work with folk artists up until the 1980s.

In 1959, the company signed Joan Baez, who would remain with the Vanguard label for the next twelve years. Two years later, they recorded Odetta at Town Hall (New York). The Rooftop Singers recorded "Walk Right In" in 1963, a hit on both sides of the Atlantic produced by Solomon along with some of their other songs. Their next single, "Tom Cat", was banned for being slightly suggestive, though tame by modern standards. It was probably Solomon's influence that induced Baez to record "Bachianas Brasileiras No. 5" by Villa-Lobos.

Solomon insisted on a clean appearance on stage, and clear diction, views in accord with majority public opinion at the time. More bravely, he signed Paul Robeson for Vanguard at the height of the McCarthy era.

Solomon's belief in Marxism was a driving force in these early years, but it was not until 1973 that his writings explicitly reflected this. His book Marxism and Art from that year has been continuously in print since then.

In the late 1960s Vanguard had some success with rock artists, most notably "Country Joe and the Fish" (today usually called Country Joe McDonald), along with some jazz, blues or disco records that have not stood the test of time. One of the most surprising signings he made, in 1969, was Michael Szajkowski, an electronic composer. Szajkowski's material was borrowed from Handel, but the sound, on a synthesizer, was far from classical. Maynard's brother Seymour, however, had previously signed humorous electronic music artists Jean-Jacques Perrey and Gershon Kingsley (Perrey and Kingsley) in 1965. That team's work has stood the test of time: their Vanguard music is still used on commercials, children's television, and elsewhere.

The numerous popular classical music series released by the Solomons on Vanguard and Bach Guild between 1950 and 1966 include, in addition to 22 Bach cantatas, pieces from the English Madrigal School performed by the Deller Consort, Italian and French madrigal masterpieces, Elizabethan and Jacobean music, Henry Purcell and the virtuoso trumpet, virtuoso flute and virtuoso oboe, along with German University Songs with Erich Kunz, songs of the Auvergne, Viennese dances with Willi Boskovsky, traditional songs by Roland Hayes, Vivaldi's Four Seasons and other concertos from I Solisti di Zagreb, music by Ralph Vaughan Williams, numerous Haydn symphonies performed by the Esterhazy Orchestra, a double LP of Gluck's opera Orfeo ed Euridice sung in Italian with the Vienna State Opera Orchestra led by Charles Mackerras, and an influential Mahler cycle with the Utah Symphony conducted by Maurice Abravanel.

== As musicologist ==
Solomon later began a second career as a musicologist, notably as author of composer biographies, and his work (particularly his studies of Mozart and Beethoven) has met with both acclaim and criticism. Three key works have been:

- (1977): Beethoven (2nd edition, 2001)
- (1989): "Franz Schubert and the Peacocks of Benvenuto Cellini", a journal article published in 19th-Century Music
- (1995): Mozart: A Life

These biographical works are filled with facts and reflect extensive research, a trait they share with many modern composer biographies. Where Solomon's work stands out is in his ability and willingness to launch striking and novel claims, often in the face of skepticism from the scholarly community. Here are some examples.

- Discussion of the lives of Mozart and Beethoven from the viewpoint of Freudian psychology, and using these ideas as the basis for understanding the actions of various individuals; for instance Beethoven's repeated reluctance to deny rumours that he was descended from royalty; or Leopold Mozart's taking over the care of his grandson from his daughter Nannerl.
- That a woman loved by Beethoven, known to posterity only as the "Immortal Beloved," can be firmly identified (from various evidence) as being Antonie Brentano.
- That the appearance of Mozart's name on the register at his wedding as "Adam" rather than his usual "Amadé," was not a trivial error but represents a symbolic act.
- That during his Berlin journey of 1789 Mozart was being unfaithful to his wife, in an involvement with the singer Josepha Duschek.
- That surviving documents can be used to demonstrate that Franz Schubert was gay (Solomon 1989).

A number of these research projects suggest Solomon relished detective work. The data he used were in general not new to scholarship, but he attempted to sift through the facts in novel ways: things like the details of mail coach schedules, close interpretation of letters, study of slang terms used by gay people, and so on, were marshaled to make the case for the surprising conclusion.

Solomon's efforts almost always provoked pushback from other scholars, both on general grounds and against the specific claims made. For instance, Tellenbach describes his work as involving "anachronistic assumptions and a lack of understanding of eighteenth- and nineteenth-century German." For reaction to his portrayal of Leopold Mozart, see Head (1999). For a post-Solomon view of the "Immortal Beloved" that admits Antonie Brentano merely as a possibility, see Swafford (2020:585-589). For a harsh critique of Solomon's use of Freudian psychology, see Stafford (2003).

=== The "Schubert as gay" controversy ===
It was the suggestion that Schubert was gay that gave rise to the greatest controversy, attracting sufficient attention to be reported in the New York Times. The musicologist Rita Steblin conducted an extended counter-campaign with several scholarly articles. Her position is summarized in the last sentences of Steblin (1993:27):

To put it bluntly, there is no evidence that Schubert or the members of his circle were homosexuals. Solomon has mistranslated several key documents, quoted selected passages out of context, and misrepresented the cultural and artistic context of society in Biedermeier Vienna. It does not speak well of our critical faculties that we are blind to the deficiencies of his argument. Schubert deserves better.

Solomon's viewpoint, however, was defended in print, among others by the mainstream musicologist Robert Winter, by music scholar Charles Rosen, and by New York Times music critic Donal Henahan. The 1989 Solomon paper continues to attract citations and scholarly attention.

== Collaborations and later career ==
Solomon's concentration on the life and work of Beethoven resulted in close collaboration with German scholars; in 1996 he was made a scholarly adviser to the Beethoven-Archiv in Bonn, in addition to becoming a member of the editorial committee for the Neue Ausgabe Beethovens Briefe (the New Edition of Beethoven's letters, Munich, 1996–1998).

Solomon became, in 1997, a member of the International Musicological Society, and addressed its congress in London. He was the author of Mozart: A Life, a finalist for the Pulitzer Prize in biography which won the Deems Taylor Award, as did his biography of Beethoven and his study of Charles Ives. His Beethoven Essays won the Otto Kinkeldey Award for most distinguished book on music published in 1988.

An associate editor of American Imago, and co-founder of the Bach Guild (a subsidiary Vanguard record label), he also published articles in applied psychoanalysis and edited several books on aesthetics. His later projects included a life of Schubert and a book tentatively titled Beethoven: Beyond Classicism.

Solomon died on September 28, 2020, in Manhattan from Lewy body dementia at the age of 90.

== Selected discography of records produced by Solomon ==
- "Best of the Vanguard Years" (2000) (The Clancy Brothers)
- "Best of the Vanguard Years" (2000) (Tom Paxton)
- "Best of the Vanguard Years" (1998) (Ian & Sylvia)
- "Best of the Vanguard Years" (2004) (The Rooftop Singers)
- "Best of the Vanguard Years" (2003) (Buffy Sainte-Marie)
- "Best of John Hammond" (1989) (John Hammond)
- "Best of Eric Andersen" (1970) (Eric Andersen)
- "Vanguard Sessions: Baez Sings Dylan" (1998) (Joan Baez)
- "Reunion at Carnegie Hall, 1963, Pt 1" (2001) (The Weavers)
- "Reunion at Carnegie Hall, 1963, Pt 2" (2001) (The Weavers)

== Bibliography ==
- The Joan Baez Songbook (1964) (by Solomon and Eric Von Schmidt)
- Noel: The Joan Baez Christmas Songbook (1967) (by Joan Baez, Solomon and Eric Von Schmidt)
- Marxism and Art (1973)
- Beethoven and the Enlightenment, Telos, 19 (Spring 1974). New York: Telos Press.
- Myth Creativity Psychoanalysis: Essays in Honor of Harry Slochower (1979)
- Beethoven (1977, 1998), Beethoven (Second, revised edition, 2001)
- Beethoven's Tagebuch: 1812–1818 (1983)
- Beethoven Essays (1988). Winner of the Otto Kinkeldey Award from the American Musicological Society
- Mozart: A Life (New York, 1995)
- "Franz Schubert and the Peacocks of Benvenuto Cellini", 19th-Century Music, 12 (3) University of California Press: 193–206, doi:10.2307/746501
- Solomon, Maynard (2001). "Biography". Grove Music Online. Oxford: Oxford University Press. doi:10.1093/gmo/9781561592630.article.41156. ISBN 978-1-56159-263-0. (subscription, Wikilibrary access, or UK public library membership required)
- (translator) Memories of Beethoven (2003) (by Gerhard von Breuning).
- Late Beethoven: Music, Thought, Imagination (2004)
